= Freemasonry in Cuba =

Grand Lodge of Cuba
- Most Respectable Grand Lodge and Supreme Council of Cuba of Ancient and Accepted Freemasons A:.L. y A:.M.
- Gran Logia de Cuba
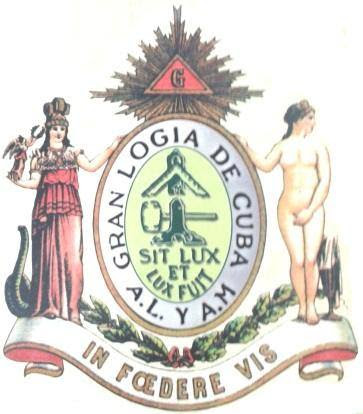

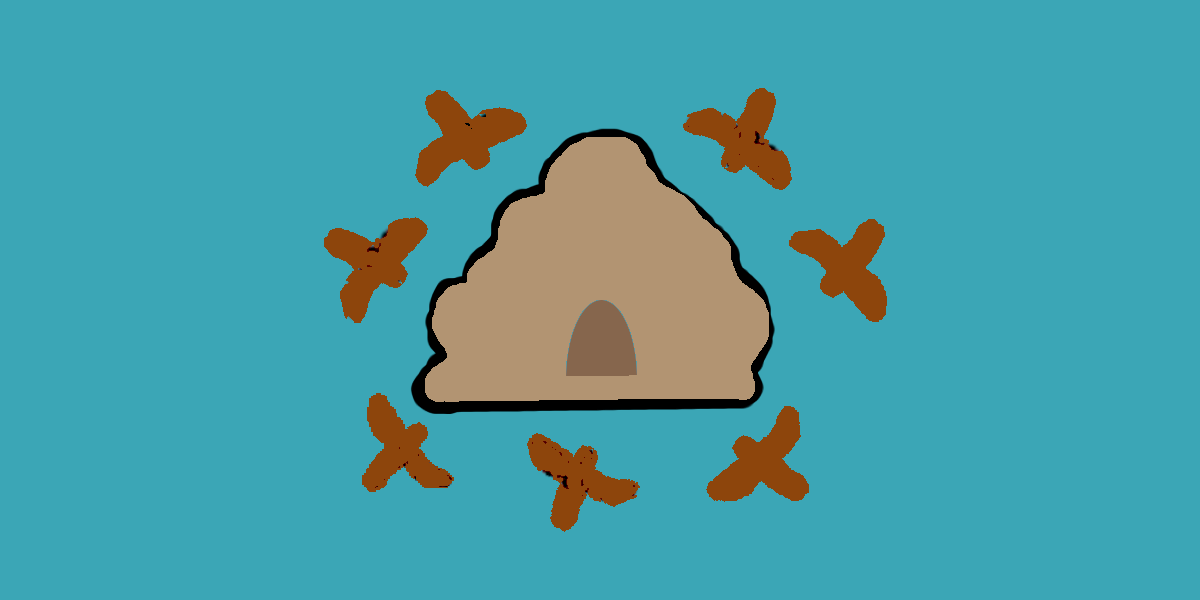
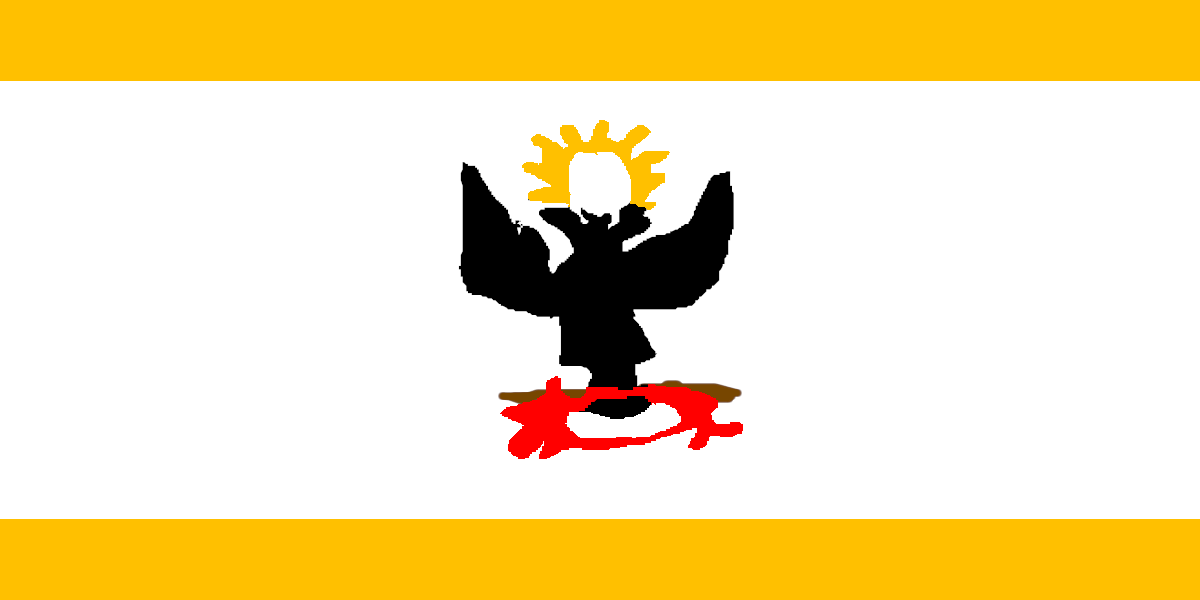
- Flag of the Grand Lodge of Cuba (left); Flag of the Supreme Council of Cuba (right)
- Established: Military Lodge (1762); Temple of the Theologic Virtues (December 17, 1804); Princes of the Royal Secret (April 7, 1818); Spanish Grand Lodge of the York Rite (November 7, 1822); Grand Lodge of Colon (November 27, 1859); Supreme Council of Colon (December 27, 1859); Supreme Council and Grand Orient of Cuba and the Antilles (March 28, 1862); Provincial Mother Lodge of Havana (May 26, 1870); Grand Lodge of the Island of Cuba (August 1, 1876); United Grand Lodge of Colon and the Island of Cuba (1880); Supreme Council of Cuba (February 5, 1899); Grand Lodge of Cuba (March 26, 1899)
- Headquarters: National Masonic Temple of Cuba, 508 Salvador Allende, Centro Habana, Havana, Cuba
- Location: Cuba
- Grand Master: José Manuel Valdés Menéndez-Cuesta
- Grand Commander: José Ramón Viñas Alonso
- Motto: SIT LUX ET LUX FUIT; "Let there be light, and there was light."; IN FŒDERE VIS; "Unity through strength."
- Subsidiaries: Daughters of Acacia; Llansó National Masonic Retirement Home
- Affiliations: Scottish Rite; InterAmerican Masonic Confederation; A. J. E. F.; Latin Freemasonry
- Website: URL HACKED, redirects to an Asian gambling website. Formerly found at www.granlogiacuba.org

Freemasonry in Cuba has a history in three primary eras; the Spanish era of Cuba, the Republican era of Cuba, and the Communist–Republican era of Cuba. Many of Cuba's independence fighters and revolutionaries were Freemasons, including Carlos Manuel de Céspedes, Francisco Javier de Céspedes, José Martí, Ignacio Agramonte, and others. While there is archaeological evidence that Speculative Masonry arrived in Cuba in 1716, Freemasonry in Cuba can definitively trace its origins back to 1762, with various lodges forming and evolving over the centuries. The Grand Lodge of Cuba officially recognizes 1859 as their conception, however, the current Grand Lodge of Cuba and its Supreme Council dates to 1899, at the collapse of Spanish rule in Cuba. Despite being expelled from the Conference of North America in 1962, following the Cuban Revolution, the Grand Lodge of Cuba is recognized as "Regular and Correct," by the majority of Lodges around the world. The Grand Lodge of Cuba is one of the 92 members of the Inter‑American Masonic Confederation (CMI), which also includes the United States. As of a survey in 2010, the islands of Cuba have 316 Masonic Lodges. Some confusion has existed about the role of freemasonry and women in Cuba; while some sources have stated that the Grand Lodge of Cuba is unique in that it allows women to be regular masons in the fraternal brotherhood, in actuality, the Grand Lodge of Cuba oversees a body for women called the Daughters of Acacia.

The degrees of Freemasonry in Cuba are overseen by two bodies; the Grand Lodge oversees the first three degrees of the Blue Lodge, while the Supreme Council oversees the higher 4th through the 33rd degrees. Master Masons are made at the fourth Degree. The Grand Master of Cuba oversees the Grand Lodge, while the Sovereign Grand Commander of Cuba oversees the Supreme Council. The Daughters of Acacia are overseen by the Great Gentle Mother of the Daughters of Acacia. The National Masonic Retirement Home is overseen by a Board of Trustees. The government of this institution is bicameral and parliamentary; with an institution called the Upper House of the Grand Lodge and another High Chamber of the Supreme Council that coordinate to draft Cuban Masonic Law. Presiding over the judicial system of that Masonic Law is the Supreme Court of Masonic Justice that decides cases. The Supreme Court of Masonic Justice is subdivided into Chambers, including the First Chamber of the Supreme Court and the Second Chamber of the Supreme Court, which are overseen by magistrates and a President of the Chamber. For cases that involve the government of Cuba outside of Masonic Law, the Grand Lodge and Supreme Council report to the Office of Religious Affairs (OAR) of the Communist Party of Cuba. The Grand Lodge and Supreme Council are also registered entities on the Registry of Associations, which is overseen by the Office of Associations at the Ministry of Justice.

The Cuban activist and historian Emilio Roig de Leuchsenring wrote of Freemasonry in Cuba:

"To fully express what Freemasonry represents for us in a few words, suffice to say that, without mentioning it once, twice and perhaps a thousand times, one cannot write the history of Cuban culture or Cuba's struggle for freedom."

== Overview of the revolutionary character of Cuban Freemasonry ==
From the early days that Freemasonry was permanently established in Cuba, its founders and members had to contend with the fact that Freemasonry was illegal and forbidden by not only Spanish law, but also by the Roman Catholic mechanisms that pervaded the Spanish colonies. Despite having a lower population than the other Spanish colonies in the region, Cuba was one of the older Spanish colonies in America, and home to some of the most fervent Spanish imperialists in the world, mostly belonging to its Planter class of Spaniards and Criollo people. By Spanish law at the time, to be found guilty of the practice of Freemasonry meant that a Spaniard in Cuba would be dispossessed of their lands and "property," (including slaves) and often subjected to jail time, or even execution.

The Masonic historian Emanuel Rebold wrote:

"In no place except Cuba has one seen Freemasonry exposed to such atrocious persecution as in this Catholic reign par excellence, persecution founded on the bulls of Clement XII (April 27, 1738) and Benedict XIV (March 18, 1751), and the edict of Cardinal Consalvi (August 12, 1814), in all of which Freemasons are excommunicated and the severest punishments, including that of death, were inflicted upon them."

Historians debate the impact that Freemasonry had on Cuban revolutionary movements, with some Masonic historians explaining that while most revolutionaries in Cuba were Freemasons, their connection to Freemasonry was coincidental. Other historians, however, state that the two movements were directly connected. In an empire where Freemasonry would land you in prison, the very act of joining the brotherhood was itself a political act, as much as modern Freemasonry strives to remain apolitical. In Cuba, from the very beginning, Freemasonry was political.

There is broad consensus that the Ten Years' War was started by Freemasons and developed in Masonic Lodges. The Cuban Revolution of 1895, though, is less directly impacted by Freemasonry, despite the fact that all of its leaders were Freemasons.

Over the centuries, the Freemasonic movements and currents in Cuba bifurcated themselves along distinct lines; those Lodges that had been planted by Spaniards from the mainland, and those that existed as autochthonist Lodges risen within Cuba. Eastern Cuba, and particularly Oriente Province, with its cultural epicentre at Santiago de Cuba, was for most of Cuba's history culturally distinct from Western Cuba and the city of Havana. Debates between Catholics, Protestants, and Secularists stirred further divisions. When the Cuban identity was being developed as distinct from a Spanish colony, hot debates between autonomists and separatists took place in the Cuban Masonic Lodges.

The issue of slavery was hotly debated within all secret societies, not only in Cuba, but in the entire Caribbean and the Gulf of Mexico, and especially within the societies of Freemasonry in Latin America. Views on slavery would prove to quickly cause a strife between two very different brands of Freemasonry that developed in Cuba. The brand of Freemasonry that eventually won-over in Cuba was pro-independence and anti-slavery, conjoined with a prevailing current of Spanish liberal constitutionalism.

== Masonic symbolism in the national symbols of Cuba ==
=== Flag of Cuba and coat of arms ===
The flag of Cuba is directly connected with the history of Freemasonry in Cuba. In June 1849, it was designed and constructed in an apartment in New York City by the Venezuelan Narciso López, drawn by the Cuban writer Miguel Teurbe Tolón, and sewn together by Emilia Teurbe Tolón. Others involved were Cirilo Villaverde and his wife Emilia Casanova de Villaverde. Everyone involved in the design and construction of the flag was also associated with Freemasonry. The lone star, the five stripes, and the triangle display Masonic symbolism. The stripes, intentionally reminiscent of Old Glory, also feature three horizontal blue stripes; the first three degrees of the Blue Lodge.

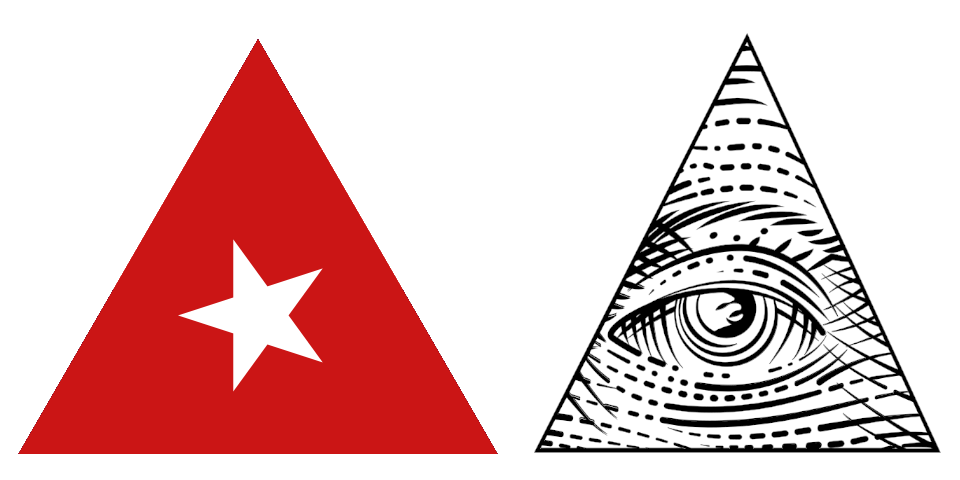
The "masonic triangle" of the Cuban flag is placed over three horizontal blue stripes, representing the three degrees, or the "Three Great Lights," of the "Ancient Craft," known as the Blue Lodge. This imagery invokes the Great Pyramid, the Great Temple, or the Great Mountain standing alone, with the All-Seeing-Eye of Providence watching over it, and the heavens casting down the Three Great Lights of the Ancient Craft.

Years after its creation, Villaverde wrote: "It was suggested that this should include the All-Seeing-Eye, but Brother Lopez objected that it would be too difficult to work in silk and bunting." So, instead of the Eye, they chose the shape of the Lone Star of Texas to be placed on the equilateral triangle. Albert Mackey, who in 1859 was heavily involved in Freemasonry to Cuba, wrote about the relevance of the triangle and the pyramid to Freemasonry.

Narciso López and Miguel Teurbe Tolón also collaborated on the Coat of arms of Cuba.

=== La Bayamesa ===
Carlos Manuel de Céspedes was either initiated or introduced to the concept of Freemasonry during his time studying in Spain the 1840s, but as well, he studied what secret societies he could of the entire Mediterranean region from Syria to Turkey on his travels. After the death of Narciso López, in 1851, de Céspedes wrote the original version of La Bayamesa with the poet José Fornaris. In 1867, de Céspedes joined Estrella Tropical Lodge No. 19, in the town of Bayamo. Most records indicate that this was his initiation.

On August 13, 1867, a meeting was held at Estrella Tropical Lodge No. 19 to discuss the revolution against the Spanish. After the meeting, Francisco Maceo Osorio turned to Perucho Figueredo, and said to him: "...now it's your turn, who are a musician, to compose our own Marseillaise." Figueredo finished the instrumental composition the next day, on August 14.

On October 20, 1868, Figueredo finished the lyrics of the current version of Cuba's national anthem as the revolutionary troops entered Bayamo.

== First Freemasons in Cuba ==
=== Early evidence of Speculative Freemasonry ===
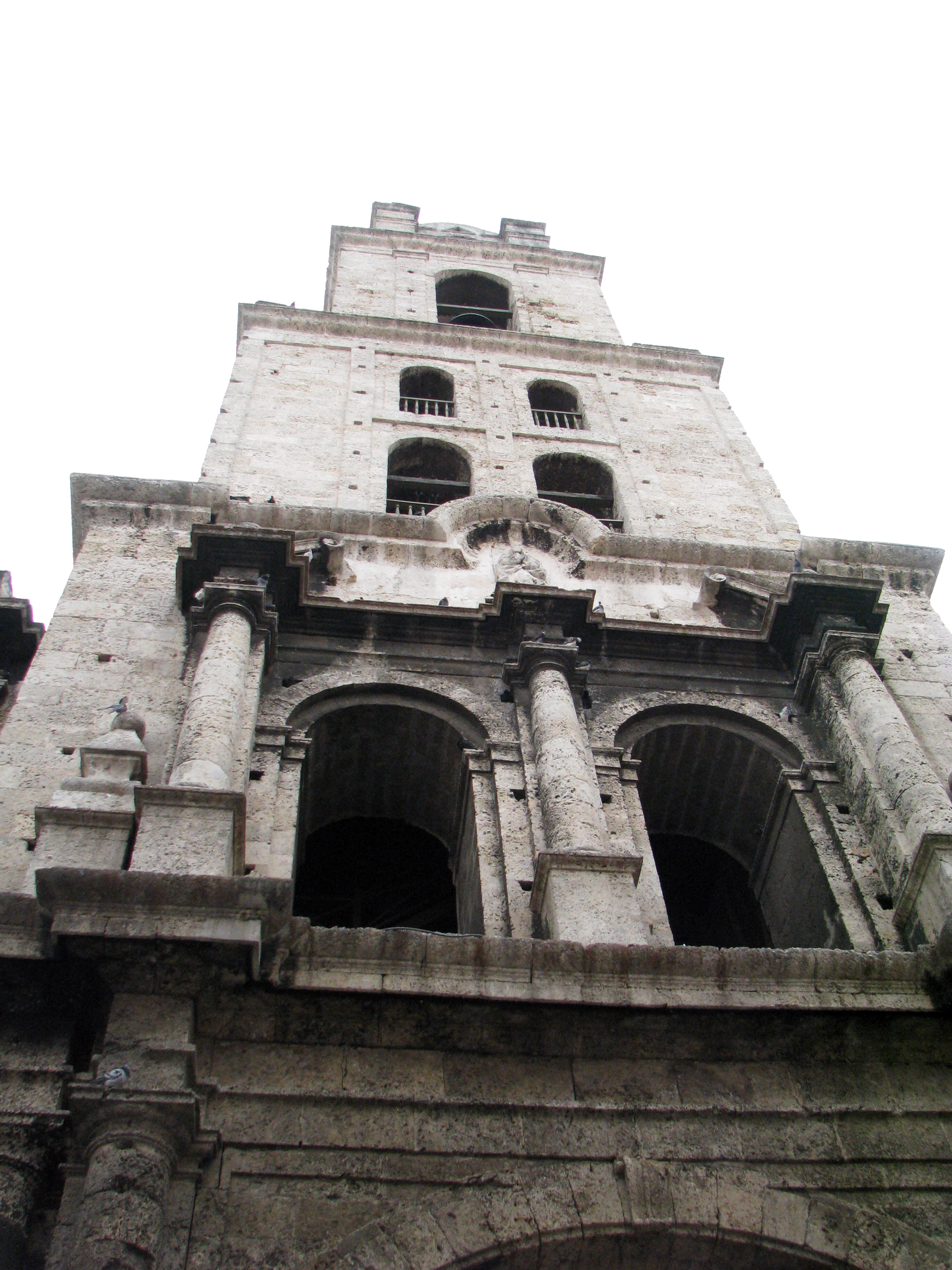
The Convent of San Francisco was the first Masonic Temple in Cuba, with evidence that it was constructed by Operative and Speculative Freemasons.

The first Masons in Cuba were most likely Speculative and Operative, not Symbolic, and arrived by the early half of the 18th Century, as indicated by archaeological evidences of Masonic symbols that were found carved into the stones of the Convent of San Francisco as Mason's marks, which have been relatively dated to its current construction beginning in 1716, the year before Symbolic Freemasonry was established in England. These symbols were carved by operative stonemasons who had been brought into the country by the Catholic Church from disparate parts of the European continent to work on the construction project. At that time, Operative Masonic and Speculative Masonic guilds in Spain were not centralized, functioning instead as independent and unique Lodges, and it was not until 1728 that they formed the unified body of Freemasonry in Spain. The Convent of San Francisco did also receive renovations in 1731, but Havana's official City Historian, Eusebio Leal Spengler, stated during an inspection of the site that the marks were part of the construction of the convent and were not added anytime after the first half of the 18th Century.

In 1738, ten years after Symbolic Freemasonry arrived in Spain, Pope Clement XII issued a Papal bull banning the practice of Freemasonry in the Catholic church. Following this, the Grand Inquisitor of Spain issued an edict banning the practice within the Spanish church by punishment of excommunication and a fine. In 1750, José Torrubia, while working for the Holy Office of the Inquisition in Madrid, went undercover as a Freemason in Spain. At the end of his assignment, he gave the Supreme Tribunal a list of 97 Lodges and urged the Vatican to prosecute them to the greatest extent.

In 1761, Ferdinand VI was convinced by the Grand Inquisitor to make Freemasonry illegal in any Spanish territory, subject to the death penalty.

=== Military Lodge No. 218 ===
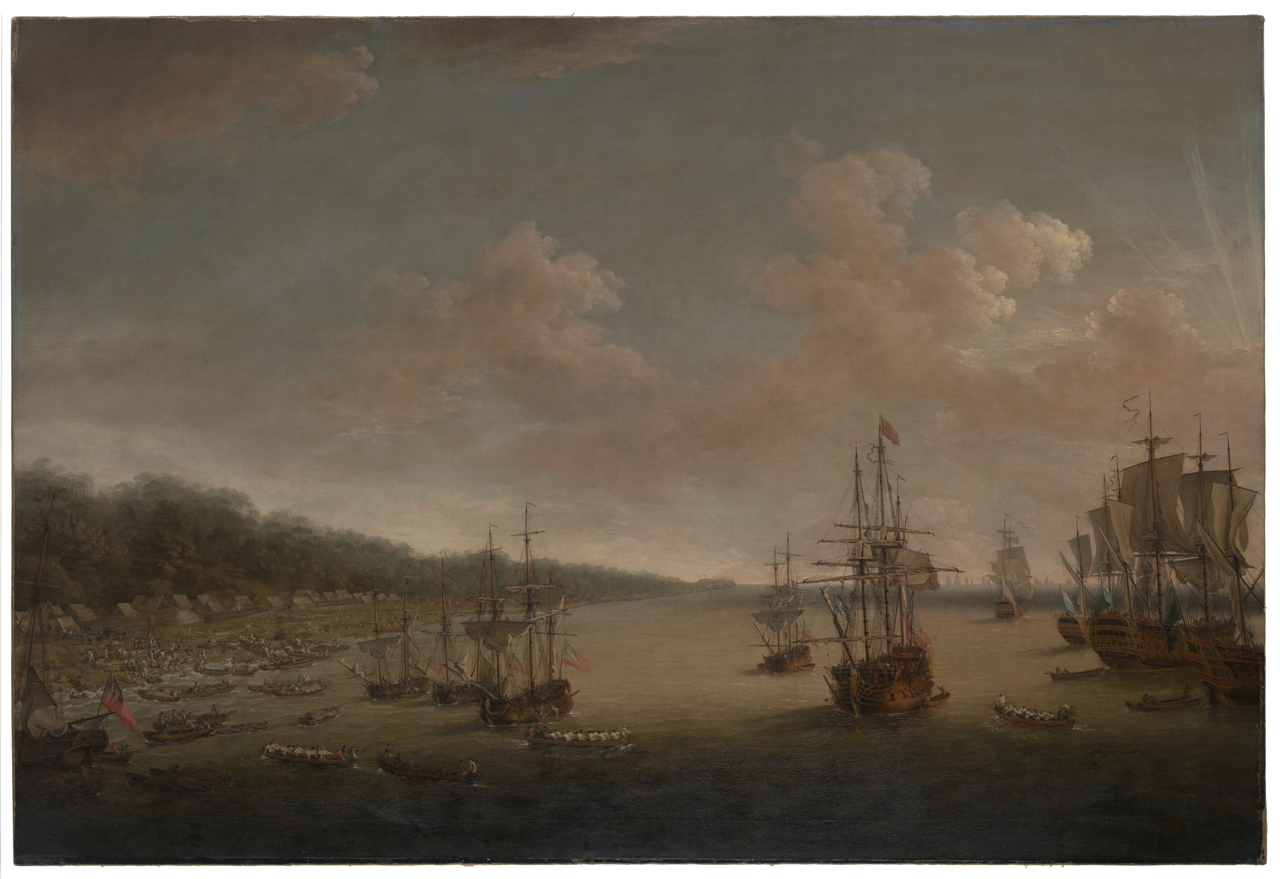
British forces landing in Havana in the Capture of Havana on June 7, 1762.

During the tenure of the Marquess of Carnarvon as the Grand Master of the Premier Grand Lodge of England in 1754, nine Provincial Grand Masters were appointed to oversee the development of Ancient Freemasonry in their nine respective Provincial Grand Lodges. Cuba was listed as one of these nine Grand Lodges, alongside South Carolina, South Wales, Antigua, North America, Barbados, Sicily, Germany, and Chester. This indicates to some Masonic historians that Freemasonry had already made it to the island by this point, but in what numbers is unknown.

The first known Lodge in Cuba arrived with the British occupation of Havana in 1762, during the Anglo-Spanish War. It was common practice in this era for the Grand Lodges in the British Isles to establish Military Lodges in foreign locales, as they had already done in Jamaica.

The 48th Regiment of Foot, known more commonly at the time as Webb's Regiment or the D. Webb Regiment under the command of Colonel Daniel Webb and Lieutenant Colonel Christopher Teesdale, landed in Cuba with the 2nd Brigade under Brigadier General Walsh and the Earl of Albemarle's invasion force. After landing in Cuba, the 48th joined with the rest of the brigade to attack and occupy Havana.

The Military Lodge connected to the 48th Regiment of Foot held a warrant from the Grand Lodge of Ireland as Lodge No. 218, chartered in 1750. While the Regiment was stationed here in Havana, it quartered its officers in the Convent of San Francisco, where the earliest Masons in Cuba had been involved in its construction a half-century earlier.

In an edition of the Ars Quatuor Coronatorum, the quarterly historical journal of the Quatuor Coronati Lodge, Masonic historian Robert Freke Gould verified the existence of a membership certificate issued by this Military Lodge. The document, 8.75 inches long and 8.5 inches wide, was a parchment sealed with a red wax seal, and tied with a yellow and blue ribbon.

The membership certificate stated:

“And the Darkness Comprehended it Not–

In the East, a place full of Light where reigns silence and peace. We, the Master, Wardens, and Secretary of the Worshipful Lodge of Free and Accepted Masons, dedicated to St. John, No. 218 on the Registry of Ireland, held in the Forty-Eighth Regiment of Foot (Ne Varietur), adorned with all their honors and assembled in due form,

Do hereby declare, certify, and attest to all enlightened men across the face of the Earth that the bearer hereof, Alexander Cockburn, has been received an Entered Apprentice and Fellow Craft, and after sufficient proof and trial, we have given unto him the sublime degree of Master. He may lawfully and safely, without any demur, be admitted into and accepted by any society to whom these presents come, greeting.

Given under our hands and seal at our Lodge Room at Havana, this 3rd day of May, in the year of our Lord 1763 and in the Year of Masonry 5763.”

Signed:

William Smith, Master
James Lee, Warden
Richard Coombs, Warden
Peter Tobin, Secretary

Gould also wrote that during the regiment's time in Cuba, eleven members were initiated into Lodge No. 218.

Historian Eduardo Torres Cuevas has written:

"A question arises during this period: Was it possible that individuals within the island's power structure were linked to Freemasonry? Much remains to be studied in this regard. The fact that, during those years, the Cuban political government, as well as a significant portion of the emerging Havana oligarchy, were closely linked to the Count of Aranda's group in Spain, gave rise to the hypothesis that some of its members were Freemasons and, therefore, held meetings in Cuba... This hypothesis appears to have faded after the work of Dr. José Antonio Ferrer Benimeli, who clarifies the historical enigma of the Count of Aranda as a Freemason."

In 1767, in mainland Spain, the Grand Logia Española changed its name to Gran Oriente and was recognized by the Grand Lodge of England.

== Early French influence and the first Cuban Lodges ==
=== Refugee Lodges of Hispaniola ===
In 1748, on Cuba's neighboring island of Hispaniola, Freemasonry in Haiti was established by the Grande Loge de France with the St. Jean de Jérusalem Ecossais (English: St. John of Jerusalem) in Cap-Français, Saint-Domingue (known today as Haiti). The second Haitain Lodge was chartered in 1765 at Los Cayos, called Les Frères Réunis No. 1 (English: Reunited Brothers).

When the Haitian Revolution started, a mass exodus of French and Saint-Domingue Creole refugee emigres left Saint-Domingue and settled in Cuba. Freemasonry was allowed to continue for some time during the war in Saint-Domingue, where Huet de la Chapelle had become the Grand Master of the French Provincial Grand Loge in 1795, until a change in government forced the Haitian Lodges to flee the island and relocate elsewhere. As that conflict then spilled over the border into Santo Domingo (known today as the Dominican Republic), the Eastern half of that island also experienced a wave of emigration as Spaniards fled the colony. Most of these refugees from Saint-Domingue and Santo Domingo landed in the port towns of Oriente Province, especially Baracoa and Santiago de Cuba.

In 1798, La Bénéfique Concorde was reestablished in Baracoa, La Persévérance was reestablished in Santiago de Cuba, and La Concorde L'Amitié relocated to Havana. The charters for these French Lodges, however, specifically limited their activities to Hispaniola. Operating in Cuba was technically a violation of their jurisdiction, and they are usually not considered the "first" Cuban non-military Lodges, because they were not chartered to operate here. They spoke French at meetings, wrote their materials in French, and continued to use their French Lodge names, instead of changing them to the local Spanish.

=== Temple of the Theologic Virtues ===
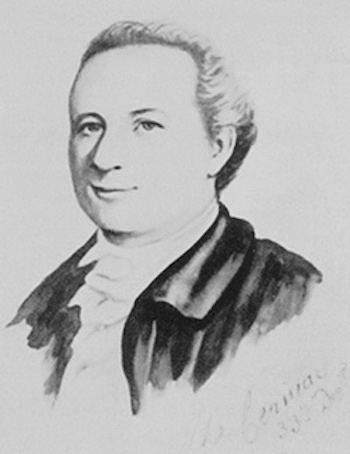
Joseph Cerneau, a Frenchman born in 1763, was the founder of the first non-military Masonic Cuban Lodge, and after his expulsion from Cuba, created a counter-cultural movement within the Scottish Rite called Cerneauism.

On December 17, 1804, the Grand Lodge of Pennsylvania chartered the Temple of the Theologic Virtues, No. 103, (French: Le Temple des Vertus Théogales) at Havana. Joseph Cerneau, who had recently arrived from Saint-Domingue, was appointed its first Master. The Scottish Rite in these days only held 25 degrees, and Cerneau had achieved the 25th Degree that year. Cerneau's associates were Pierre Courroy and Pierre Bauschey. The original core of this Lodge were Frenchmen, who brought with them new ideas of the recent French Revolution. Cerneau was deported from Cuba in 1806, and wound up in the United States, where he established the Grand Consistory and the Cerneau Rite. The Temple of the Theologic Virtues remained intact, however, after his departure.

On November 18, 1805, Reunion de Coeurs was added to the roster of French speaking Lodges seeking refuge from the Haitian Revolution, and reformed in Santiago de Cuba. In 1806, Concorde and Peseverance also established Lodges in Santiago de Cuba, where they adopted Spanish names.

In Havana, the streets of Calle Amistad, Calle Concordia, and Calle Virtudes took their names from the Lodges that operated there.

With the Napoleonic invasion of Spain in 1808, anti-French sentiment grew in Cuba. The French speaking Lodges began leaving the island with the refugees who had brought them. Also in the year 1808, at the conclusion of the Spanish reconquest of Santo Domingo and the repossession of the Eastern half of Hispaniola by Spain, the Governor General of Cuba sent all of the recent arrived refugees back to that colony. In so doing, these immigrants then dismantled their two Lodges they had been operating, Concordia and Perseverancia, and left the island.

Many of these refugees moved to New Orleans, Louisiana District by 1809, and the next year, established the Concorde Lodge, No. 117, chartered under the Grand Lodge of Pennsylvania. Later in 1810, with three other Lodges in New Orleans, they established the Grand Lodge of Louisiana. Perseverancia was also reorganized in New Orleans under the name Perseverance Lodge No. 118.

The only one of these Lodges that remained in Cuba was the Temple of the Theologic Virtues, and it also changed its name to Spanish; Templo de las Virtudes Teologales. The French members mostly having left the island, the remaining members were mostly Creole.

=== Conspiracy of 1810 ===
The Conspiracy of 1810 was instigated by three members of Temple of the Theologic Virtues. This was one of the first coordinated attempts at rebellion against Spanish rule to create an independent state in Cuba, and also saw the creation of the first constitution ever written on Cuban soil for the governing of an independent Cuba. The three ringleaders of this revolution were Román de la Luz, Luis F. Bassave, and Joaquín Infante.

The constitution written by Joaquín Infante was completed in the same year that the Spanish Constitution of 1812 was completed in Cádiz.

De la Luz was discovered when his wife informed her priest of her and her husband's involvement in the revolution during confession. The priest absolved her of her sins, but used the information to launch an investigation against De la Luz. De la Luz was arrested as a heretic and a traitor and deported to Spain. Despite the fact that his wife had sent him money each month while he was in prison, the church intercepted the payments and withheld them. Román de la Luz died in prison.

On July 17, 1814, Don Manuel Ramirez was jailed without a trial in Cuba, charged with being a Freemason.

== Other early lodges ==
On April 15, 1820, Cubans received news that Rafael del Riego and his Liberal constitutionalist movement was triumphant in Spain. Juan Manuel de Cagigal publicly swore his allegiance to the 1812 Constitution, after being forced to do so by regiments of the Spanish Army from Málaga and Catalonia. Only days after the announcement of the new situation in Spain, several Masonic Lodges and other secret societies that had been operating in secret began operating openly. They had large numbers, and during the era of the Liberal Triennium, they took advantage of the situation to establish more lodges.

=== Grand Lodge of Pennsylvania ===
Between 1818 and 1822, the Grand Lodge of Pennsylvania chartered three more Lodges in Havana; Las Delicias de la Habana No. 157 on March 2, 1818, La Recompensa de las Virtudes No. 161 on May 9, 1818, La Fidelidad Habanera No. 167 on September 16, 1819, and in Regla, another Lodge named La Union de RegIa No. 166 on April 5, 1819, but all of their charters were revoked by the end of 1822.

The Grand Lodge of Pennsylvania chartered two other Lodges at Santiago de Cuba; on November 8, 1820, La Benevolencia No. 175, and on April 1, 1822, The True Philanthropy No. 181. However, these also had their charters revoked in 1826.

=== Grand Lodge of Louisiana ===
In 1803, the US Government made the Louisiana Purchase. On April 30, 1812, Louisiana became the eighteenth US state. By the year 1815, the Grand Lodge of Louisiana had grown large enough to return to Cuba, where in Havana, they chartered Union Fraternal de Caridad No. 14. Two other Lodges, Nos. 11 and 14, were also chartered within the next three years.

There is some historical disagreement on whether EI Templo de la Divina Pastora No. 19, chartered in Matanzas in 1818, and La Rectitud No. 22, chartered in Havana in 1822, were connected with the York Rite.

=== Grand Orient of France and National Grand Orient of Spain ===
==== Princes of the Royal Secret ====
In April 1818, a member of the Grand Orient de France named Louis de Clouet, who went by the Masonic codename d'Obernay, established a Grand Consistory of the Scottish Rite in Havana, Principes del Real Secreto (English: Princes of the Royal Secret). D'Obernay authorized the Grand Consistory to establish Lodges, chapters, and councils. He also authorized it to confer the 32nd Degree. The Grand Orient of France further authorized this work under the charter of the Grand Consistory dated April 7, 1819.

Exactly how many Lodges were merged to create Principes del Real Secreto is debated. However, D'Obernay and this Grand Consistory did create several lodges, including L'Humanite, and La Constante Sophie, which received its charter directly from the Grand Orient of France.

The Blue Lodges of the Grand Consistory were formed under the Gran Oriente Simbolico de la Nueva Thebaida (English: Symbolic Grand Orient of New Thebes), which was also known as the Gran Oriente Simbolico de la Isla de Cuba (English: Symbolic Grand Orient of the Island of Cuba).

When the Grand Consistory was established, the Grand Orient of France relinquished their authority, handing it over to the National Grand Oriente of Spain. However, because the Grand Orient of Spain was bifurcated politically, the Cubans rejected its authority, preferring to remain autochthonous, instead of finding themselves on either side of the mainland Spanish divisions. Cuban Freemasonry was by this point developing its own brand of independence-mindedness, and that even branched into their Masonic authority.

==== Territorial Grand Orient ====
In the pursuit of an independent and Cuban authority, on May 14, 1821, the Grand Consistory developed the Grande Oriente Territorial Espanol-Americano-Rita Escoces de Francos-masones antiguos y aceptados (English: Territorial Grand Orient of the Spanish-American-Scottish Rite of Ancient and Accepted Freemasons), which was established in Havana. This Grand Orient was then further divided into the Symbolic Grand Orient and the Grand Consistory.

Many members of this Grand Orient were officers of the Spanish Army and the Spanish Navy. Their ambitions were evident in the fact that they claimed to hold jurisdiction over Spanish Puerto Rico, New Spain, Mexico, The Floridas, Santo Domingo, and Haiti. On their roster of Lodges, they indeed held authority over a Lodge in Tabasco called Los Amigos Filantropicos (English: Philanthropic Friends).

=== Spanish Grand Lodge of the York Rite ===
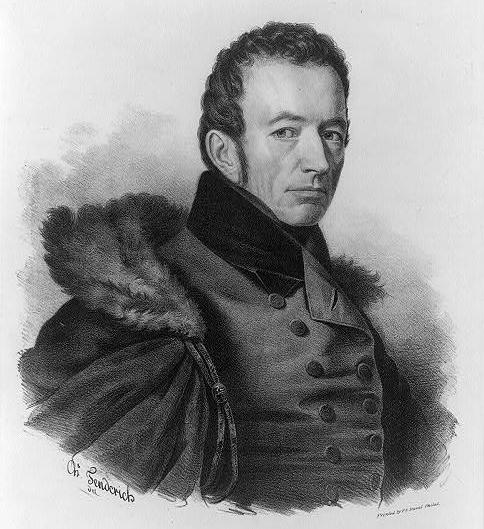
While serving as a secret agent for the US government, Joel Roberts Poinsett is credited with introducing the York Rite to Cuba.

Cuban Masonic folklore once held that on March 27, 1818, at the Convent of San Francisco, there was a merger of the Temple of the Theological Virtues No. 1, Delicias, and Constancia to form the Spanish Grand Lodge of the York Rite (Spanish: Gran Logia Española del Rito York). However, most historians reject that this Grand Lodge was created in 1818. The more commonly accepted date for the creation of this Grand Lodge was in 1822.

The secret government agent for the United States, Joel Roberts Poinsett, was a high-ranking a prominent member of the York Rite. Through him, the York Rite took hold in Mexico. Despite the fact that his private correspondences do not specifically reference Masonry in Cuba, he is still credited with developing the York Rite on the island, and the timeline of its development matches with his time spent here on fact-finding missions.

In a letter dated March 5, 1822, there were 30 established York Right Lodges in Cuba; at least seven of them belonged to the Grand Lodge of Pennsylvania, two belonged to the Grand Lodge of South Carolina, and three belonged to the Grand Lodge of Louisiana.

By 1822, the Blue Lodges under the Scottish Rite in Cuba were disgruntled with the lack of autonomy they held under the authority of the National Grand Orient of Spain, and believed that the York Rite granted more autonomy to their Lodges in Cuba. These Lodges entered into negotiations with the Grand Lodge of York Rite Masons, and began the process of merging.

On November 7, 1822, the Blue Lodges under the Scottish Rite and the York Rite were merged to officially create and charter the Spanish Grand Lodge of the York Rite. The new Grand Master was selected by drawing a name out of a hat.

As of January 29, 1823, the roster of the Spanish Grand Lodge of the York Rite included 66 Lodges in their jurisdiction.

This Grand Lodge and its Consistory were dissolved on January 1, 1828.

=== Grand Lodge of South Carolina ===
On March 27, 1818, the Grand Lodge of South Carolina chartered La Constancia Lodge, No. 50. On March 31, 1820, they chartered La Amenidad Lodge, No. 52. Both of these were chartered in Havana.

In 1821, the Grand Lodge of Ancient Freemasons sent a communication to the Grand Lodge of South Carolina that a new Grand Lodge had been formed in Cuba, and La Amenidad Lodge, No. 52 had expressed its desire to transfer to the new Grand Lodge. The Grand Lodge of South Carolina accepted the arrangement. However, La Constancia Lodge, No. 50, remained a part of the Grand Lodge of South Carolina until its members surrendered its warrant around the year 1824, stating that their decision was made "in consequence of the religious and political persecutions to which they were subjected."

== Full repression of Freemasonry in Cuba ==
=== Venezuela and the Suns and Rays of Bolívar ===
One of the flags used during the Revolution of the Suns and Rays

In 1820, a group of Freemasons from Venezuela attempted to launch a revolution against Spanish rule in Cuba. They named themselves the Suns and Rays of Bolívar (Spanish: Soles y Rayos de Bolívar), based on the name of their Masonic Lodge in Venezuela.

=== Restoration of Ferdinand VII ===
In 1823, with the end of the Royalist War, the Liberal Triennium constitutional government of Spain fell again to the Monarchist forces. On August 1, 1824, Ferdinand VII re-issued a blanket ban on Freemasonry in Spain and all of its possessions. Despite the fact that several high-ranking members of the Colonial government were also Freemasons in this era, "the Craft" was practiced entirely in secret, for the fear of all the legal repercussions that would follow from exposure. Members of the Cuban lodges also used secret Masonic codenames in correspondences.

The Governor of Cuba at the time, Francisco Dionisio Vives, managed to successfully infiltrate agents into the Lodges of Cuban Freemasonry to discover any Lodge that showed signs of disobedience and disloyalty to the Crown. In the town of Vereda Nueva, near Havana, he sent armed men to cut down and kill the members of the Lodge with machetes.

=== Mexico and the Black Eagle Rebellion ===
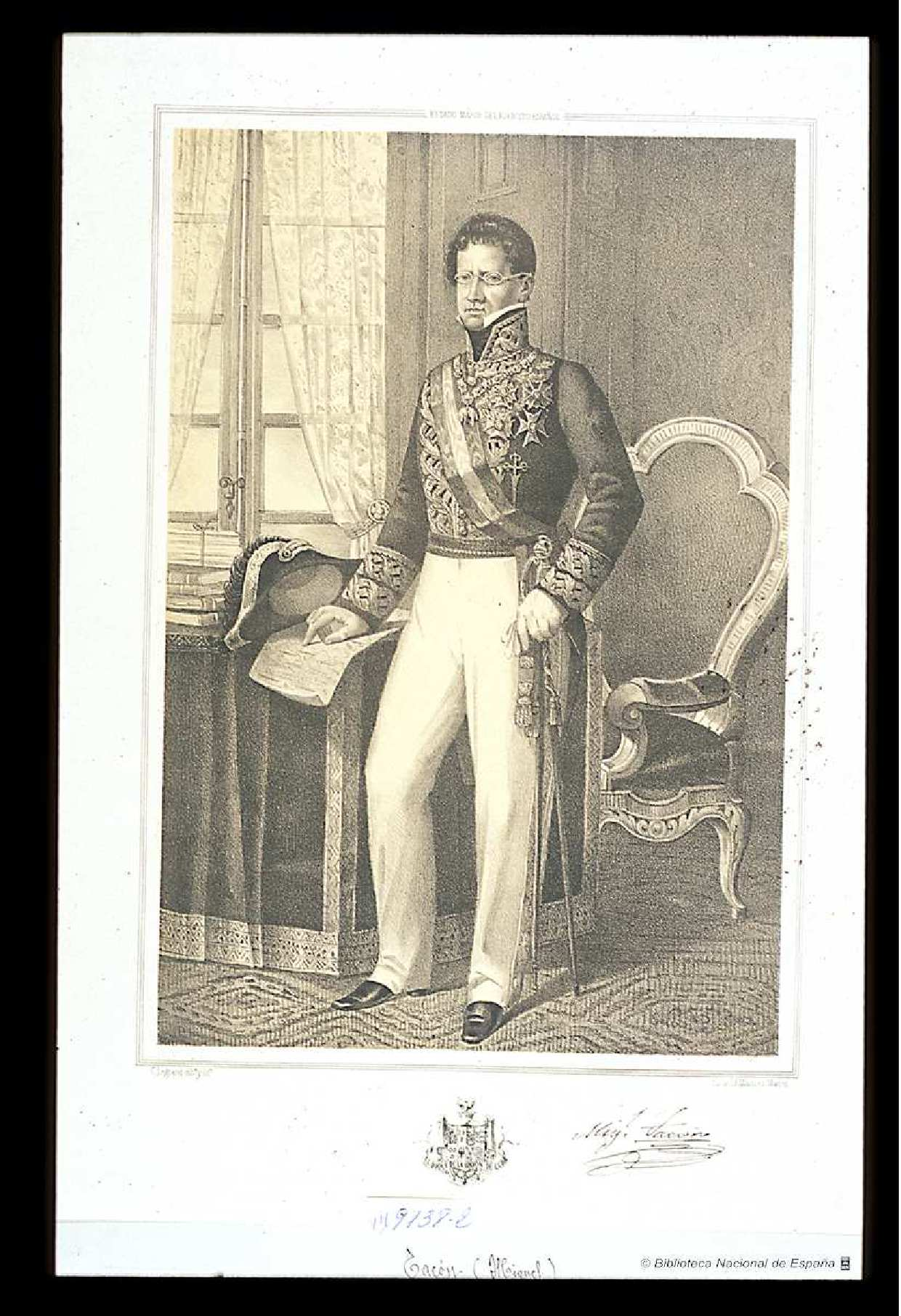
Governor Don Miguel Tacón was considered particularly ruthless in his hunting of Freemasons in Cuba.

In July 1830, the Cuban government arrested a group of Freemasons, executing some of them, and sentencing others to time in prison. Jose Solis was charged with being a Freemason and a member of the Society of the Black Eagle, and sentenced to ten years in prison in Ceuta. Felix Rodriguez Hermida, Marcos Fernandez Castaneda, and Gabino Hernandez were all killed by the Spanish during the events of the Black Eagle Rebellion.

Several years after the suppression of the Black Eagle Rebellion, the Governor Don Miguel Tacón went on an exceptionally ruthless campaign to persecute Freemasons. During his reign as Governor of Cuba, Freemasons went entirely underground, and there is no existing knowledge of Masonic activity during his reign. This era of full repression of Freemasonry lasted approximately 35 years. The government was so effective at repressing Freemasonry here that by the end of this era in 1857, not a single known Masonic Lodge or Orient was left in the entire island.

Between 1830 and 1857, Freemasons living in Cuba were only initiated into the fraternity by traveling to the United States, Mexico, France, or elsewhere abroad.

During this era, many several pro-independence societies rose up in Cuba which adopted the traditions and symbols of Freemasonry, but are considered by some Masonic historians not to be associated with Freemasonry because they were never recognized as regular or correct by any other bodies. The Puerto Principe Liberation Society, the Lone Star Order, and La Unión all considered themselves Masonic, but their affiliation is debated. La Union was a secret society that became dedicated to the Annexationist Movement, thinking that it would be better for Cuba to become a fully integrated state of the United States, rather than to remain a Spanish possession.

== Resurgence of Freemasonry in Cuba ==
In 1855, mainland Spain saw the triumph of the Spanish Revolution of 1854 and the Progressive Biennium. The Cuban oligarchy at the time was highly connected with the reformists of the Liberal Union, especially the former Governor of Cuba, Leopoldo O'Donnell had led the revolution. Reformist ideas were implemented in Cuba in 1857; the freedom of speech, freedom of the press, and the freedom of assembly. With that newfound political freedom, Freemasonry was allowed to reform in Cuba.

=== Grand Lodge of Colon ===
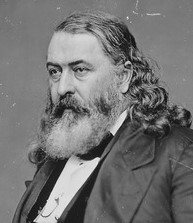
One of the most controversial figures in North American Freemasonry, Albert Pike sought to make Confederate South Carolina the epicentre of the entire Freemasonic world.

In 1857, Cuban Freemasons started on the path to form a Grand Lodge for their country. The basic requirements to form any Grand Lodge or Orient in Freemasonry is to possess three Lodges, however, there were only enough Freemasons in Cuba to form two new Lodges. Initially, they sought a charter from the Reformed Grand Orient of Hesperia (Spanish: Gran Oriente Hespérico Reformado) or the Reformed Grand Orient of Spain, but like in Cuba, Freemasonry in mainland Spain had also gone through a period of persecution and no single Grand Lodge existed anymore on the Iberian Peninsula. The Cuban Freemasons therefore found their charters in the Grand Lodge of Louisiana. That year, the Grand Lodge of Louisiana chartered Prudencia Lodge No. 2 and Fraternidad Lodge No. 1 in Santiago de Cuba.

By 1859, Cuba still did not have a Grand Lodge, and to accelerate this work, they contacted one of the most powerful figures of Freemasonry in the United States at the time, and today the most controversial figure in the history of North American Freemasonry, Albert Pike, requesting his guidance and assistance. Pike was at that time the Grand Commander of the Supreme Council of the Southern Jurisdiction of the United States for the Scottish Rite at Charleston, South Carolina.

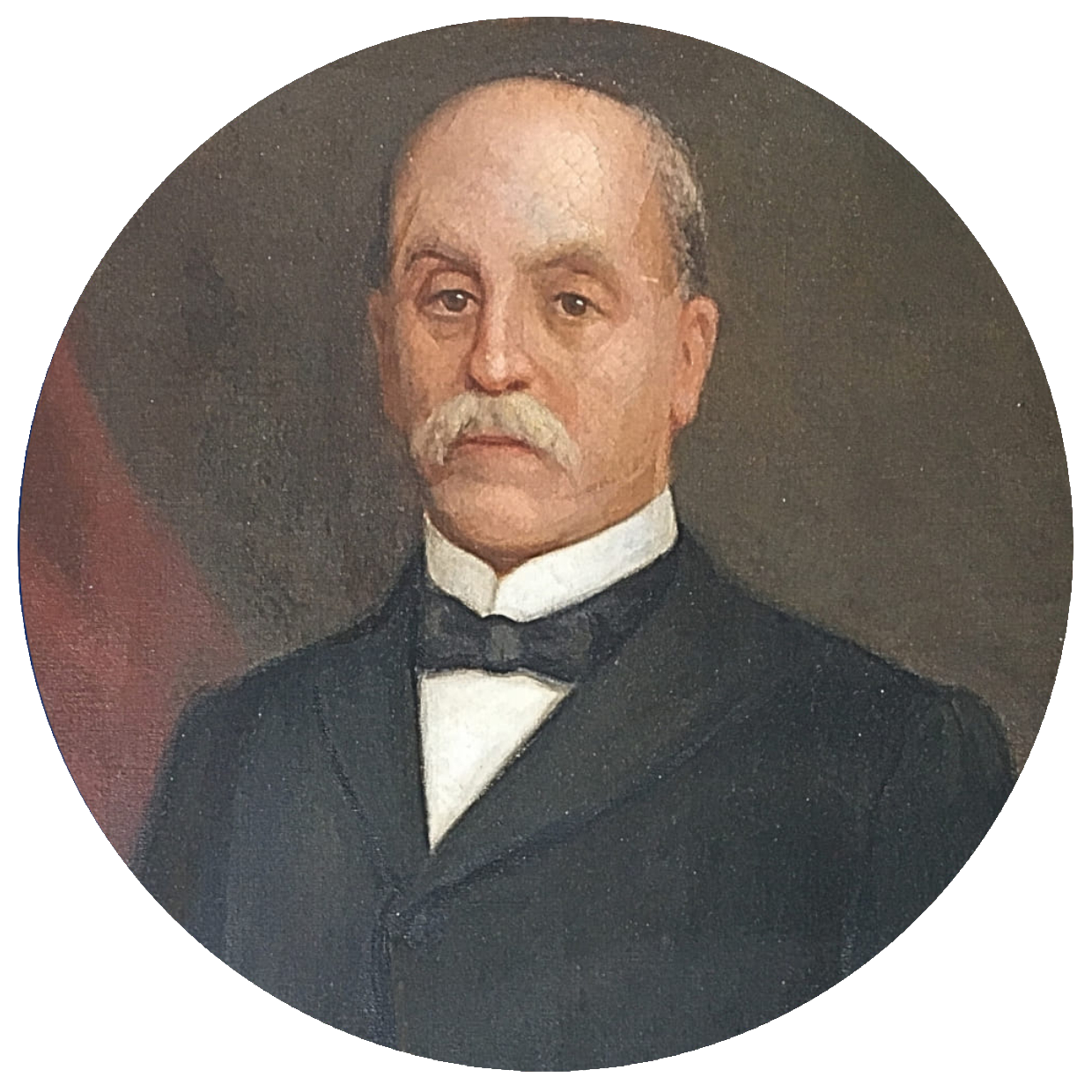
Francisco Griñán y Mozo was the first Grand Master of the Grand Lodge of Colon, in Santiago de Cuba.

On March 26, 1859, Albert Pike gave his personal authority to the Cuban exile Andrés Cassard to create new offices, degrees, and bodies of the Scottish Rite in Cuba. However, later that year, Albert Pike and Albert Mackey also granted this authority to others in Cuba. Whether Cassard was aware of that is unclear.

Four initiates from Fraternidad Lodge No. 387 joined three Cuban Freemasons living in Hudson, New York to formally petition the Grand Lodge of South Carolina to grant authority for a third Lodge. San Andres Lodge No. 93 was chartered in November 17, 1859.

On November 27, 1859, the Grand Lodge of South Carolina granted a warrant to merge the three Cuban Lodges into the first Grand Lodge seen in Cuba in almost four decades; the Gran Logia de Colón (English: Grand Lodge of Columbus) at Santiago de Cuba. Under the authority Grand Lodge of Colon, the three Lodges were restructured as Fraternidad Lodge No.1, Prudencia Lodge No. 2, and San Andres Lodge No. 3.

Francisco Griñán y Mozo served as the first Grand Master of the Grand Lodge of Colon.

The Grand Lodge of Colon, however, did not accept any members except those considered of the "white class." One of the founding membership requirement documents of the Grand Lodge of Cuba stated:

"Given that we are in a country where it is not possible for people of color to mingle with the white class—the line dividing them in society being so clearly defined that they are not admitted with absolute freedom—the MRGL should be informed that it is not permissible to receive anyone who is not considered white, even if they are of common birth, in order to avoid the unpleasantness that could arise and the conflict that would ensue if countless people of color and mixed race, whom we know to possess the finest qualities, were admitted."

~ Documents of the Grand Lodge of Colon, 1859

=== Supreme Council of Colon ===
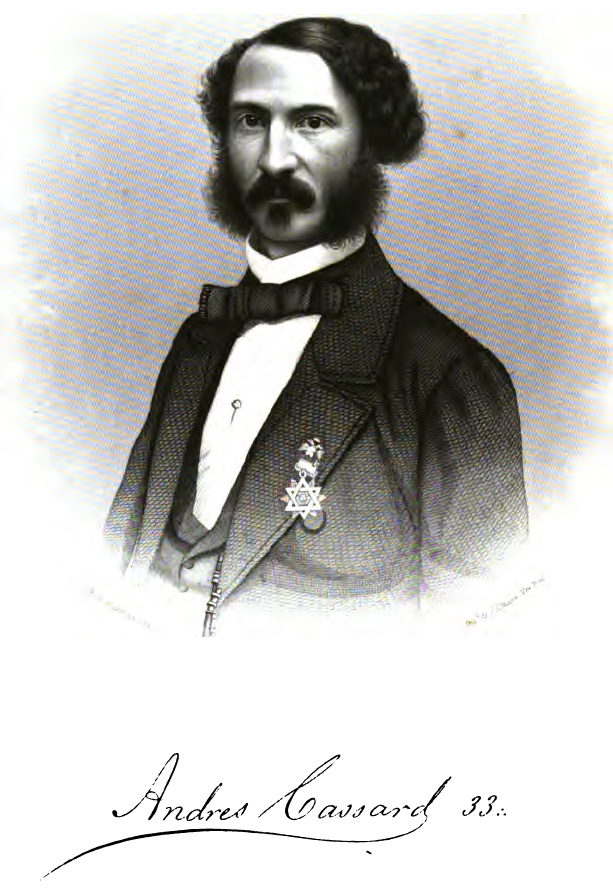
Andrés Cassard was a prominent figure in Cuban Freemasonry, exiled from Cuba for revolutionary activities, and many years later ostracized from Freemasonry because he published the popular Spanish-language book entitled Manual de la Masonería. (Manual of Freemasonry).

Cassard departed from New York City and arrived in the port of Santiago de Cuba in December 1859, personally despatched by Albert Pike. When he arrived in the city, he never left the ship. Since there was an active warrant for his arrest in Cuba, he was afraid that if he did disembark, he might have been taken into custody and executed.

On December 27, 1859, in the cabin of his ship, Andrés Cassard established a Supreme Council of the Ancient and Accepted Scottish Rite, 33°, at the direction of the Supreme Council, 33°, Southern Jurisdiction. The first Grand Commander of the Supreme Council was Antonio Vinent y de Gola, V Marqués de Palomares del Duero, one of the wealthiest property owners in Oriente Province. He had earned the title of Marquis in the service of the government against the independence movement.

In 1860, a rift started to form between the Grand Lodge of Colon and the Supreme Council of Colon. This rift between the Supreme Council and the Grand Lodge was about more than the ability to charter Lodges, it was deeply rooted in the different political ideologies between Protestants and Catholics. While Freemasons in the capitol in Havana maintained closer links to the United States, the Eastern city of Santiago de Cuba was much closer culturally to the Catholicism in the rest of Latin America. Being predominately Catholic landowners, the Supreme Council viewed the Grand Lodge as one filled with Protestantism and Anglo-Saxon ideas.

Despite the fact that consistories in Freemasonry are only meant to administer the higher degrees, the Consistory believed it had authority to manage the Blue Lodges. The Supreme Council, despite being designed to administer the 33rd degree, had started chartering new Lodges without consulting the Grand Lodge of Colon.

On May 22, 1860, Restauracion Lodge No. 4 was chartered in Jiguaní. In 1861, Amor Fraternal No. 5, Segunda Prudencia No. 6, and Dicipulos de Salomon No. 7 were chartered. In 1862, Fe Masonica Lodge was formed in Havana by members of Amor Fraternal.

=== Creation of GOCA and the rise of liberal, secular patriotism ===
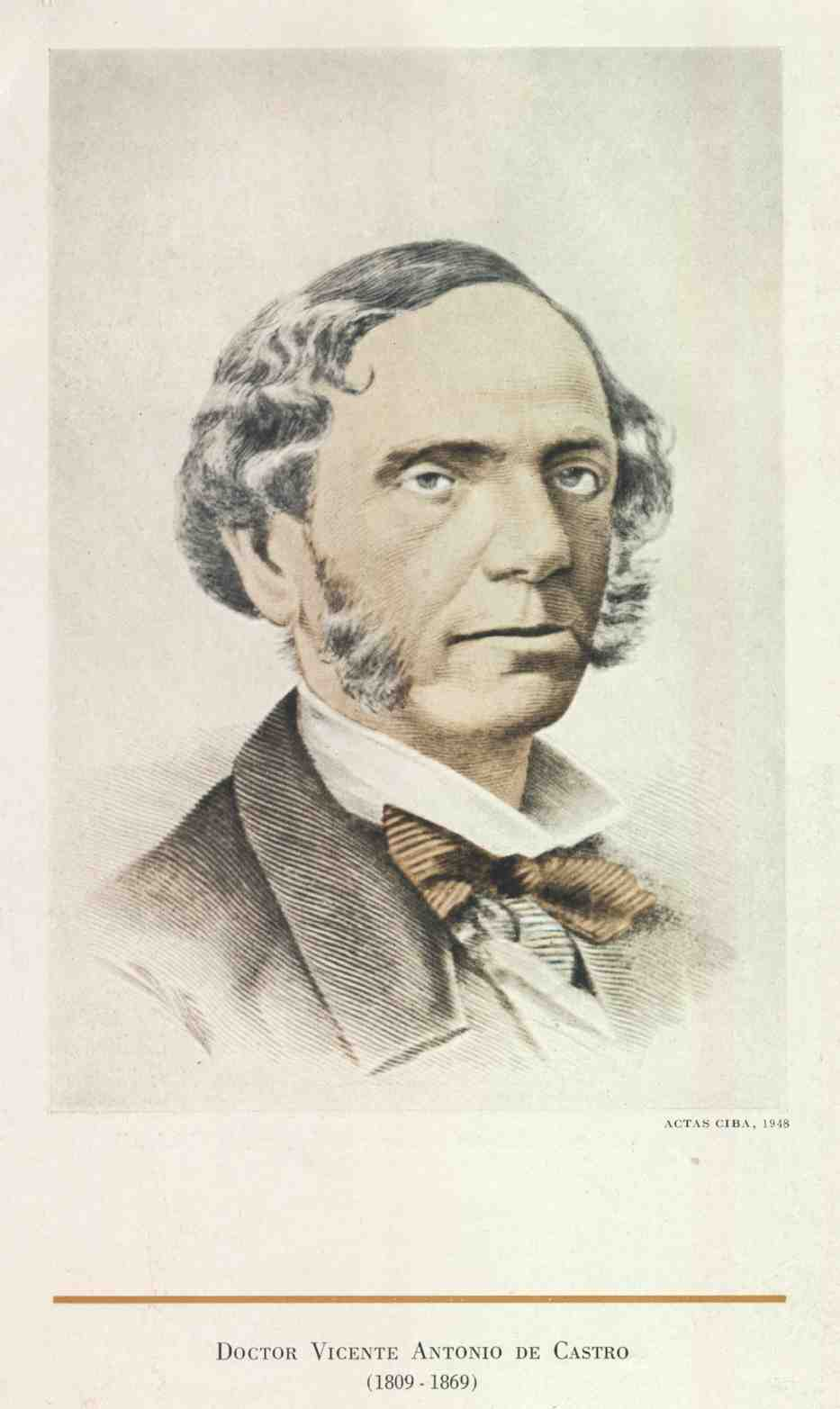
Vicente Antonio de Castro was sent back to Cuba by Albert Pike to take over from Andres Cassard in 1861, but quickly became an enemy of Pike.

Albert Pike lost confidence in Cassard's performance. In 1861, he sent another Cuban named Vicente Antonio de Castro back to Cuba to take over and "...regularize any error that Andres Cassard might have committed in organizing the bodies of Cuba, and to establish that peace and harmony that should exist among the ancients in the Ancient and Accepted Scottish Rite."

Albert Pike and the Grand Lodge of South Carolina became increasingly embroiled in the American Civil War. Pike served as a General in the Confederate States Army, and de Castro began acting more autonomously. Instead of withdrawing from Freemasonry, however, Pike sought to make Confederate South Carolina the epicentre of the entire Masonic world.

de Castro, when he observed the currents within Colon Freemasonry, saw that even though the Grand Lodge and the Supreme Council disagreed on much of the issues in society, they were mostly led by Spanish loyalists desiring that Spain remain a part of Cuba's future. Historians note the discord, because before the Civil War, Albert Pike had long been a proponent of Manifest destiny and a soldier in the Westward Expansion – but the Lodges he created were still loyal to Spain. Still at the forefront of the debate was the institution of slavery.

On March 28, 1862, instead of co-organizing with the Colon bodies, de Castro created an entirely new body called the Supremo Consejo y Gran Oriente de Cuba y Las Antillas (GOCA) (English: Supreme Council and Grand Orient of Cuba and the Antilles). After absorbing the Lodges around Havana and some other parts of the island, GOCA was recognized as regular and correct by the Supreme Councils of France, England, Scotland, and some other European countries. According to some Masonic historians, however, Cuba and the Antiles was considered illegal. From 1862 to 1868 GOCA established roughly twenty Lodges around the country.

de Castro had no luck in absorbing any of the Lodges around Santiago de Cuba, and they remained loyal to the Grand Orient of Colon. Eastern and Western Cuba became increasingly bifurcated in Freemasonry. Despite being the birthplace of Cuban Freemasonry, Oriente Province, and especially Santiago de Cuba, were considered culturally and geographically isolated to the Lodges around Havana.

Andrés Cassard and Albert Pike became furious with de Castro. Pike wrote a letter dated November 17, 1865, and accused GOCA of insubordination. He called it "...nothing more than a putrid den of Jacobins." Pike lamented that GOCA was a club more concerned with politics, and not one that upheld the ideals of Freemasonry.

In direct opposition to Pike, GOCA published content in which stated that the Southern Jurisdiction was stuck in the dark ages of Old-Testament mysticism. They argued that instead of the Anglo-American motto of Freemasonry, theirs was more closely aligned with the original French Masonic tradition that had once existed in Cuba: Liberty, Equality, Fraternity. They espoused liberalism, declared themselves to be rationalist and Enlightenment thinkers, democratic and anticlerical. They maintained secularist ideas and advocated for non-religious education. Most importantly to their character was Cuban patriotism. GOCA was rooted in what became the movement of Latin Freemasonry.

=== Independent Grand Lodge of Colon ===
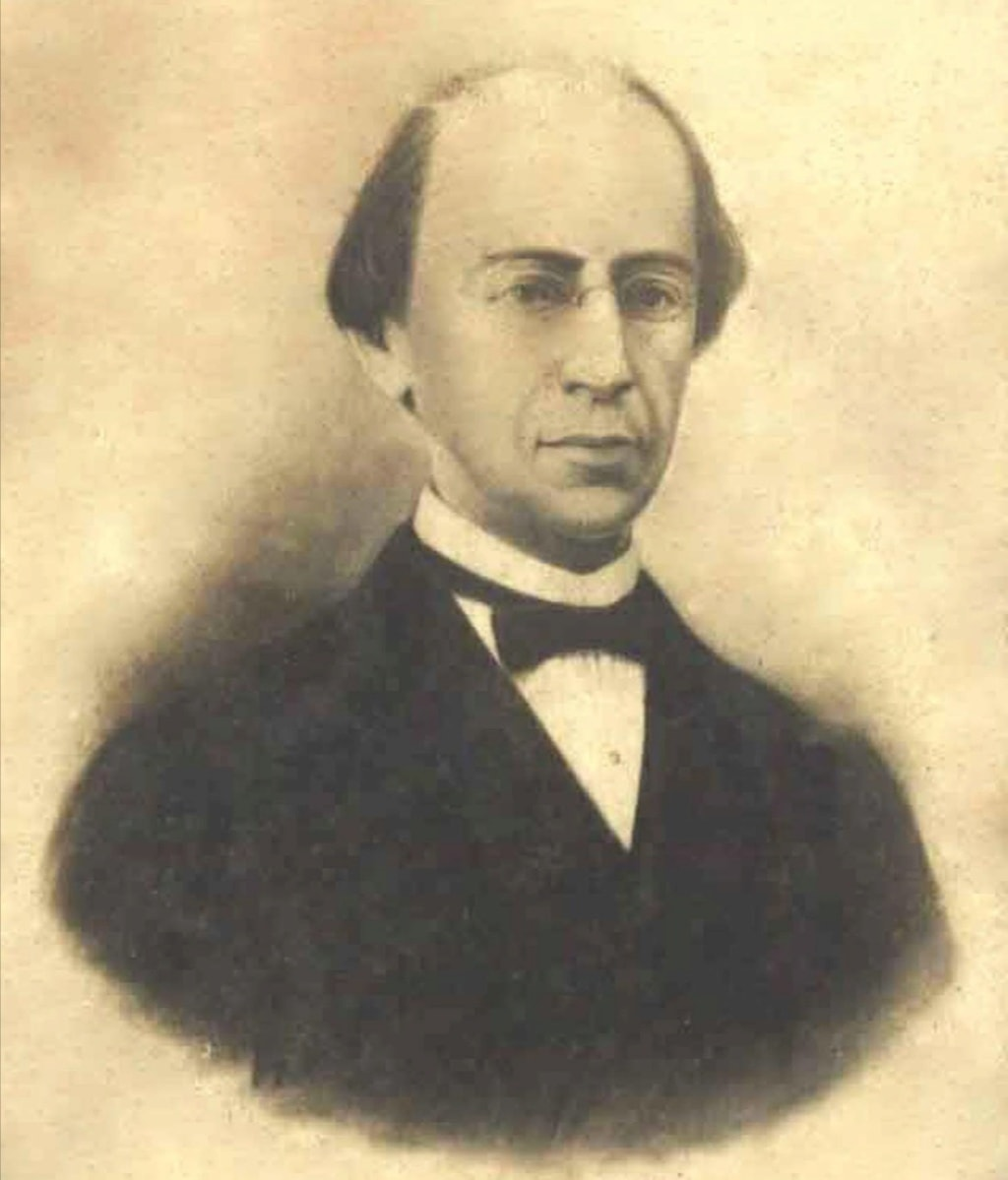
José Andrés Puente Badell, Grand Master of the Grand Lodge of Colon, was tortured and executed by the Spanish during the Ten Years' War on the charge of being a Freemason.

At the insistence of Albert Pike (after he had been allowed to return from exile to the United States), in 1867, the Grand Lodge of Colon under the leadership of Grand Master Andrés Puente, established its own constitution. Even though they recognized the sovereignty of the Supreme Council, their new constitution established that the Grand Lodge of Colon held the exclusive authority to enact its own bylaws, issue charters, and regulate its own Lodges.

Albert Pike gave his staunch support and approval in the new autonomy of the Grand Lodge.

The Supreme Council of the Scottish Rite in Cuba, however, outright refused to recognize any independent authority of the Grand Lodge of Colon. They dissolved the Grand Lodge and assumed all of its orders.

On September 20, 1867, the Grand Lodge of Colon agreed to suspend their constitution until a joint meeting of the Supreme Council and the Grand Lodge could occur, where the parties were scheduled to discuss the situation. That meeting was scheduled to happen on November 25, 1868. That meeting never took place, due to the outbreak of the Ten Years' War.

=== Grand Lodge of Havana ===
In 1868, under the authority of GOCA, a number of Lodges in Havana chartered the Gran Logia de la Habana (English: Grand Lodge of Havana), but this Lodge was formally dissolved with the outbreak of the Ten Years' War. This Grand Lodge had only existed for less than a year.

== Ten Years' War ==
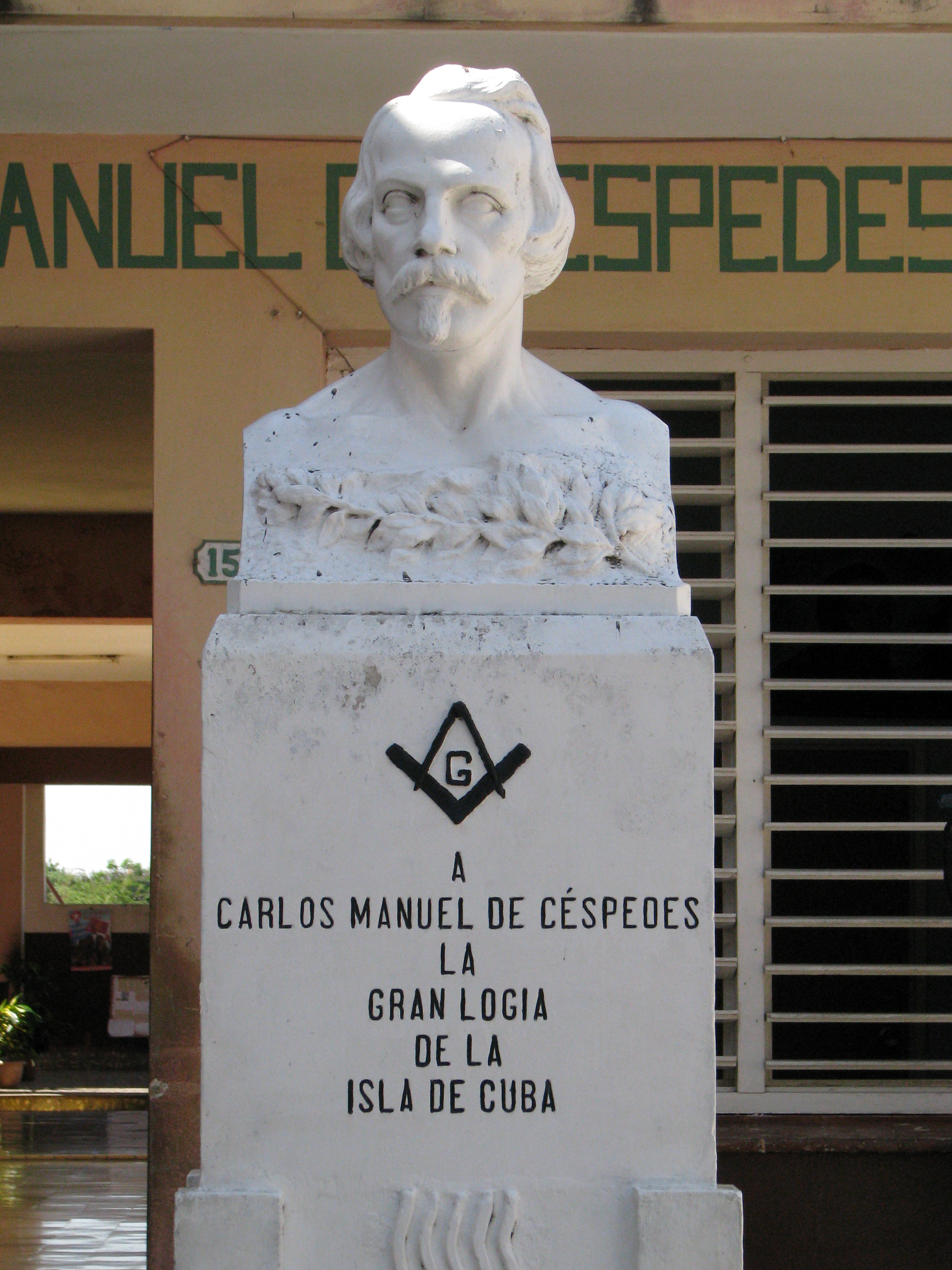
Carlos Manuel de Céspedes, known as the Father of Cuba, was the Worshipful Master of Good Faith Lodge. During the war, he created Independence Lodge. He used the Masonic codename Hortensia.

On October 10, 1868, Carlos Manuel de Céspedes freed his slaves and declared revolution against Spain at the Cry of Yara. de Céspedes was also the Worshipful Master of Logia Buena Fe (English: Good Faith Lodge) at Manzanillo, a Lodge within GOCA. Around this time, the first "non white" Cubans were initiated as Freemasons into the revolutionary Masonic Lodges.

The Colonial government saw the Freemasonry movement in Cuba as inherently associated with the revolutionary movement. They feared that gatherings of Freemasons could be used as cover for the revolutionary cause, and went on a renewed campaign to fully suppress Freemasonry in the colony.

On the same day that the war was declared, GOCA was dissolved in Havana. Many of the revolutionaries who signed the Guáimaro Constitution were also Freemasons. However, almost all of the revolutionary Freemasons during this war were former members of GOCA, as in the beginning of this war, the Colon Freemasons were largely supportive of Spanish rule.

With the dissolution of GOCA, its former members founded individual Lodges during the war. Famously, Carlos Manuel de Céspedes established the Independence Lodge. Tínima Lodge and Camagüey Lodge were also created around this time.

The Grand Lodge of Colon was absorbed by the Supreme Council in Santiago de Cuba, but it could no longer operate at full capacity, and could not rely on spiritual support from abroad. Spanish spies were monitoring traffic from the United States. More importantly to the officers of the Supreme Council, the Grand Lodges of Europe were fractured politically, choosing to side with either the Grand Lodge of England or the Grand Orient of France over the direction of the movement itself.

In 1868, Jose Orberá y Carrión, the Provisional Governor of the Archbishopric of Cuba, published a circular condemning Freemasonry in Cuba, claiming that it was a secret religion that went against the doctrine of Catholicism. He also asked all those sinners to return to the church. Maximiliano Galan replied that Freemasons in the Spanish territories were acting according to the teachings of Christ, and that the Catholic Church was now persecuting Freemasons in the same way that Ancient Rome had treated early Christians.

Freemasons fought on both sides of the war. Donato Mármol, a General of the Cuban Liberation Army, was also a high-ranking Freemason. On one occasion, when his troops captured a Spanish convoy on the battlefield, one of the Spanish lieutenants asked to see Mármol. The lieutenant was also a Freemason, and after they greeted each other using Masonic gestures, the lieutenant convinced General Mármol that the convoy was delivering humanitarian aid, not military supplies. General Mármol then let the convoy on their way, to the displeasure of his subordinate officers.

By the beginning of the year 1869, most of the members of Colon Freemasonry were under surveillance by the Spanish.

"What a singular thing. The more our Order is persecuted the more it lives for its country, the more it aids its government by the establishment of public schools."

~ An anonymous Cuban Freemason, 1869

On February 11, 1869, Jose Rosell was imprisoned by the Spanish government with several others on the charge of being a Freemason. On March 21, they were deported to the brutal Penal colony at Fernando Poo, Spanish Guinea. Some time later, Rosell was taken to the notorious prison of San Juan de Ulúa at Vera Cruz. There is an implication that Rosell was tortured, and after this Lodge No. 12 was persecuted greatly by the Spanish. After this, all Cuban Lodges were ordered to suspend their activities. Most Lodges stopped meeting at their temples altogether, and started holding meetings at their own houses.

Vicente Antonio de Castro died on May 12, 1869.

=== Martyrs of San Juan de Wilson ===
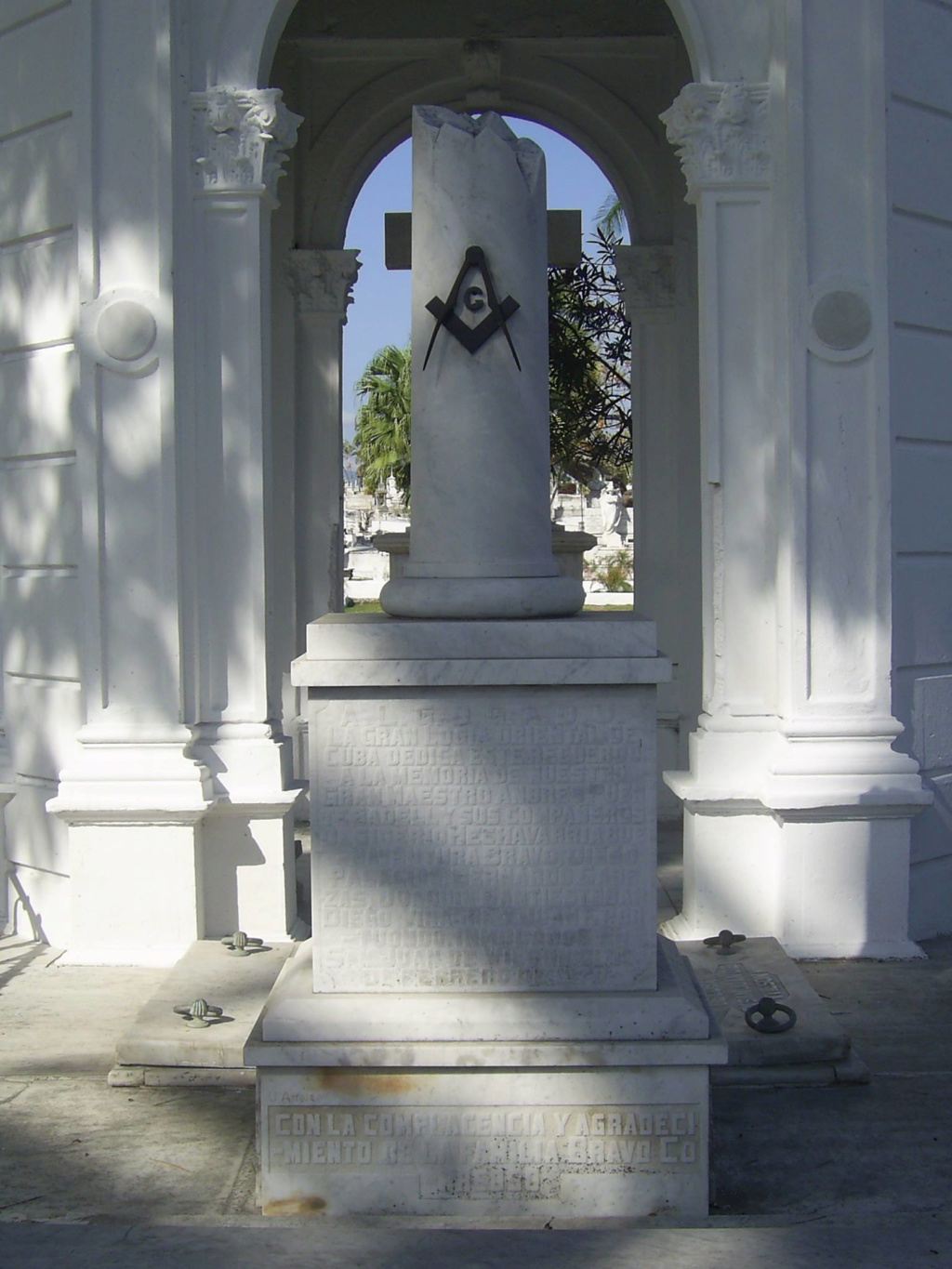
Monument to the Martyrs of San Juan de Wilson in Santa Ifigenia Cemetery, Santiago de Cuba.

In the Winter of 1869, the Spanish Volunteer Corps of Cuba (Spanish: Cuerpos de Voluntarios de Cuba) compiled a list of Freemasons and other Masons in Cuba. This list was not limited to the revolutionary GOCA Freemasons, it also included members of Colon Freemasonry; the Volunteer Corps and the new Antimasonry movement in Cuba did not distinguish between the two, believing that they were all involved in revolutionary activities.

Commander Carlos González Boet rounded-up eighteen people near Santiago de Cuba he suspected of being Freemasons at Fraternidad Lodge No. 1. All through the countryside, he sent men in the middle of the night to kidnap men from their homes, or in the middle of broad daylight on the street. Going into the New Year of 1870, Boet took these men to the San Juan de Wilson sugar mill (Spanish: Ingenio San Juan de Wilson), near El Cobre, where he sentenced them as traitors.

On February 13, 14, and 15, 1870, González Boet executed them by gunshot without trial, including the Grand Master of Colon, José Andrés Puente Badell, and Esteban Miniet, the Grand Treasurer of Colon.

Other Freemasons were arrested and sent to prison.

Commander González Boet was also a Freemason.

==== Memorial ceremony for the Martyrs of San Juan de Wilson ====
At 6:30pm on March 5, 1870, San Andrés Lodge No. 3, in Havana, held a memorial ceremony to observe Masonic funeral rites for the deceased Grand Master Andrés Puente. Despite the fact that certain members of the Lodge were afraid that a memorial gathering would put their lives in danger, nevertheless more than 100 people made a fully-packed temple that night, with all Lodge members present.

The local police, however, had also known that there would be a memorial that night. When the temple was full, the armed and uniformed police mustered in the street out front of the Lodge. As the police were getting into formation, local citizens gathered behind them and grew into a large mob, chanting and crying out: "Kill the conspirators, death to the Cuban Council!"

When the police breached the building, the Outside Guard informed Worshipful Master Nicolas Dominguez Cowan that the police were on the stairs. Cowan addressed the Freemasons: "Do not be alarmed, my dear brethren, our fate, whatever it may be, we must face with courage; we must save our charter above everything else."

Edward Godwin, a government employee at the local customs house, escaped the Lodge with the charter and brought it to the safety at a house belonging to another Freemason, where he stashed it. Of the over 100 people in the building that night, over 40 of them were arrested and taken to prison. Some of the members were able to evade capture.

Those forty or more Freemasons who were arrested that night were imprisoned for one hundred days. None of them ever denied the charges that they were Freemasons, and when asked, readily stated the positions that they held. However, even in captivity they were able to raise $1,632 to repair the chapel of the Catholic Church. The Parish Priest and the prison doctor then successfully petitioned the Spanish to release those Freemasons from prison.

=== Grand Lodge of Colon vs. Provincial Mother Lodge of Havana ===
By 1870, only seven lodges were left in the entire island of Cuba.

On May 26, 1870, the former GOCA Lodges around Havana, distancing themselves from the Colon Freemasonry of Santiago de Cuba, established the First Provincial Mother Lodge of Havana. They elected as Grand Master Severino Fernández Mora, who was a former Spanish Army physician in the Military Health Service of Spain that had been exiled from the country for revolutionary activities and ideas. Quickly, the Supreme Council recalled the warrant for the Mother Lodge.

On April 11, 1873, the Grand Lodge of Colon resumed its work, despite the fear of reprisal. In 1875, they arranged with the Supreme Council to secure jurisdiction over Symbolic Masonry and the authority to charter new lodges.

In 1873, the Supreme Council sent out a decree that all bodies in Cuba were to be directed by the Consistory. This included the Grand Lodge of Colon. The Supreme Council also decreed that members of the 31st through 33rd Degrees were granted honorary membership at any Lodge in Cuba.

On May 23, 1875, the Second Provincial Mother Lodge of Havana was established.

In 1875, the Supreme Council sent two delegates to the Congress of Supreme Councils in Lausanne, Switzerland. Freemasons in Cuba were surprised that they were accepted where Spain's delegation was refused attendance. The Cuban representatives, David Elías Pierre and Benjamín Odio, became signatories to the Pact of Confederation of the Supreme Councils which the Congress produced. At this Congress, the Supreme Councils of the world reinforced the idea that Scottish Rite Freemasonry was philanthropic and fraternal, not political. The French Supreme Council also replaced Liberty, Equality, Fraternity with the new slogan Brotherly Love, Relief and Truth.

=== Creation of the Grand Lodge of the Island of Cuba ===
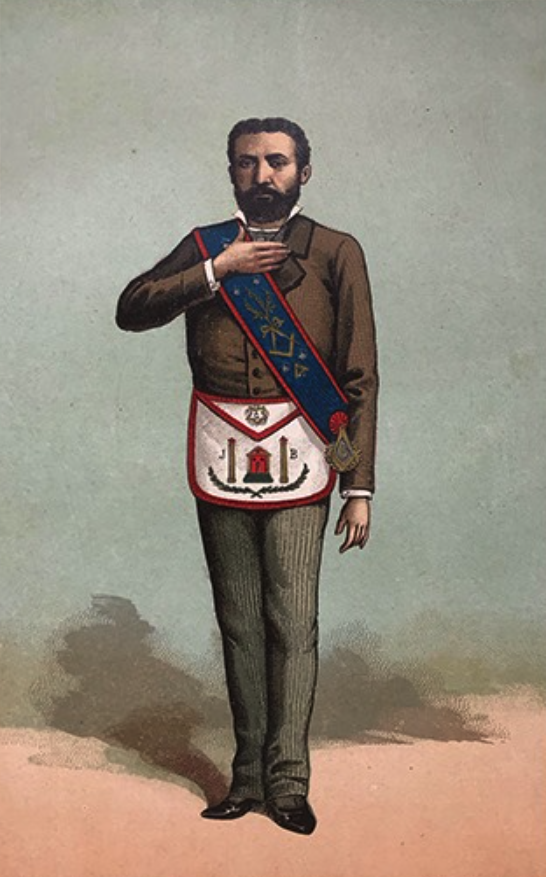
Aurelio Almeida y González created the Grand Lodge of the Island of Cuba, and wrote its first Masonic Code.

In 1876, the former GOCA Freemason and high-ranking member in the Provincial Mother Lodge member Aurelio Almeida y González went on a tour of the United States. Here, he obtained broad support from the Masonic bodies of North America.

In July 1876, back in Cuba, the Mother Lodge started asking questions about the money that the Supreme Council had been asking the Lodges to pay, and insisted on a proper accounting – but their effort was suppressed. Later in July, Almeida y González sent a telegraph cable to the Mother Lodge.

On July 28, 1876, days after Almeida y González's telegraph arrived in Cuba, the Mother Lodge dissolved itself.

On August 1, 1876, representatives from thirteen Cuban lodges (9 chartered lodges and 4 under dispensation) met in Havana to form the Gran Logia de la Isla de Cuba (English: Grand Lodge of the Island of Cuba). Under the charter of the Grand Lodge of Island of Cuba, the Higher Degrees were overseen in Cuba by the Grand Orient of Spain and Práxedes Mateo Sagasta. Within a month, the Grand Lodge of Cuba possessed 17 lodges.

The new "Cuban" Freemasonry was effectively a restructuring and reorganization of GOCA Freemasonry and its Lodges, but the Grand Lodge of Cuba was now considered "regular and correct," officially abandoning GOCA's ideology of direct political action. This allowed them to obtain recognition from the majority of Grand Lodges in North America.

In mainland Spain, the Spanish Restoration was underway, and the Cuban government was starting to introduce new legislation and freedoms with the aim to end the Ten Years' War. In Cuba, there was also a nascent "Cuban identity," based in free thought, secular social institutions, and ideological liberalism. Colon Freemasonry and Cuban Freemasonry moved closer together ideologically, but could still not agree on the core tenets of Freemasonry and the ideology of Cuban independence.

Over the next several years, the Grand Lodge of the Island of Cuba surpassed Colon Freemasonry. Almeida y González wrote an entirely new Masonic Code. He wrote literature and books about Freemasonry, including El Consultor Del Masón (English: The Mason's Consultant) and Jurisprudencia Masónica (English: Masonic Jurisprudence). He also reproduced many of the works of GOCA and Vicente Antonio de Castro. These works were widely distributed within Latin American Freemasonry.

The Grand Lodge of the Island of Cuba was the first Cuban body in history to spread into Spain and charter its own Lodges on the mainland.

=== Colon Treaty of Peace and Friendship ===
On August 26, 1876, the Grand Lodge of Colon in Santiago de Cuba declared itself entirely independent as a sovereign Masonic Body with its own full and unlimited powers over its own subordinate lodges. Under their auspices, the Grand Lodge of Colon possessed 36 lodges and 8,000 members.

On November 24, 1876, the Grand Lodge of Colon and the Supreme Council of Colon signed the Tratado de Paz y Amistad (English: Treaty of Peace and Friendship). This treaty was based in the agreements of the Lausanne Congress. It degraded the superior prestige of the higher degrees, eliminated authoritarian positions at the Supreme Council, ejected the Spanish aristocracy from holding undue power, and erased the mystical positions. The Supreme Council of Colon recognized the Grand Lodge of Colon as "regular and correct," and also recognized their authority over the three degrees of the Blue Lodge. The Grand Lodge recognized the Supreme Council as the authority over the 4th to 33rd degrees.

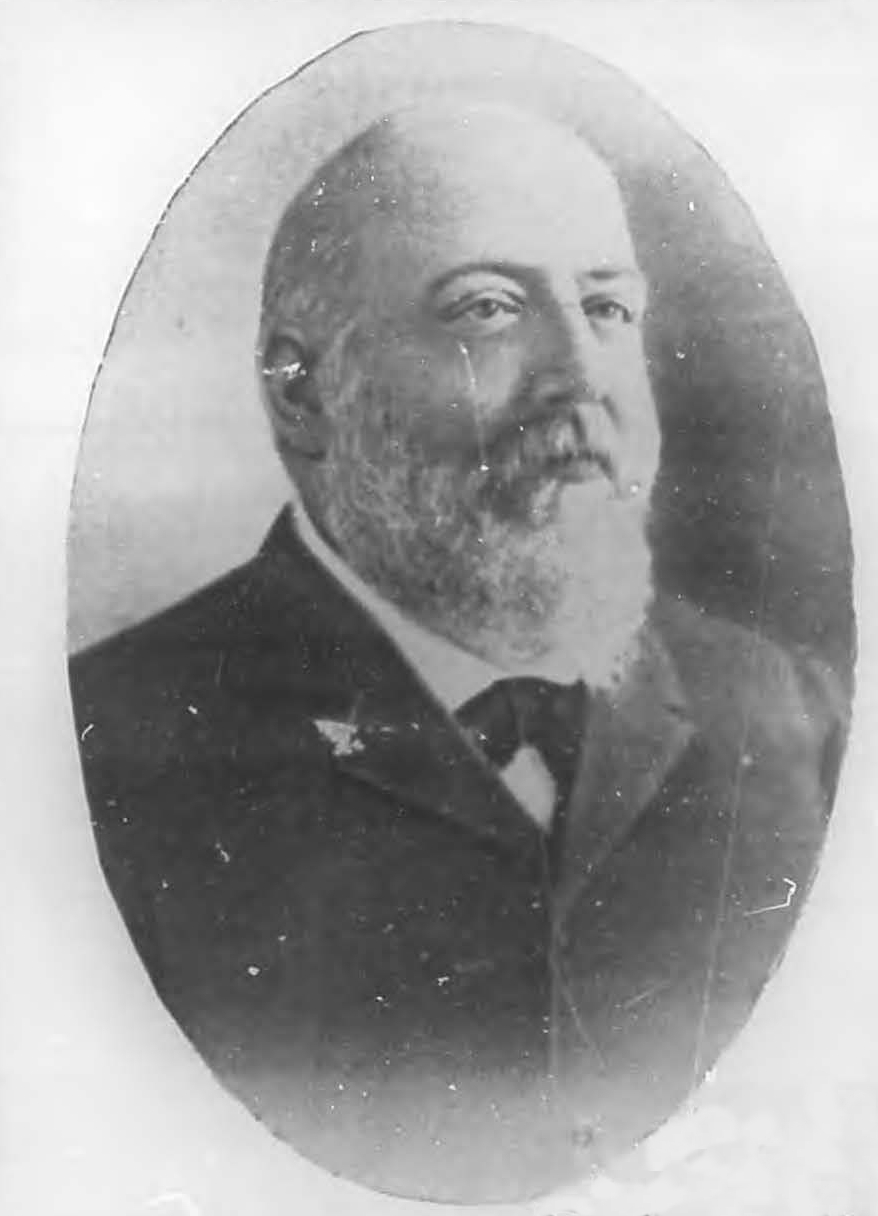
Antonio Govín y Torres was the Grand Master of the Grand Lodge of Colón when it moved to Havana.

Despite the signing of the Treaty of Peace and Friendship, Colon Freemasonry was still fundamentally divided between Eastern and Western Cuba and their cultural epicentres of Havana and Santiago de Cuba. José Fernández Pellón y Castellanos, leader of the Havana movement of Colon Freemasonry, entered into negotiations to relocate the Grand Lodge of Colon to Havana. He represented the interests of 27 Lodges in Western Cuba, all desiring that the Grand Lodge make the move. Soon after, the Grand Lodge of Colon did move to Havana, but the Supreme Council remained in Santiago de Cuba.

On July 20, 1877, the Grand Lodge of Colon was officially reestablished in Havana, under Grand Master was Antonio Govín y Torres. The Masonic Lodges in their umbrella allowed for peaceful dialogues between Spanish reformists and Cuban pro-independence advocates.

Several of the Colon Blue Lodges in Eastern Cuba did not agree with the decision. In 1877, some former members of the Grand Lodge of Colon at Santiago de Cuba established a second Grand Lodge of Colon at Havana. From 1877 to 1879, there were three Grand Lodges in Cuba operating simultaneously, all making the claim to be the "Regular" Grand Lodge.

== United Grand Lodge of Colon and the Island of Cuba ==
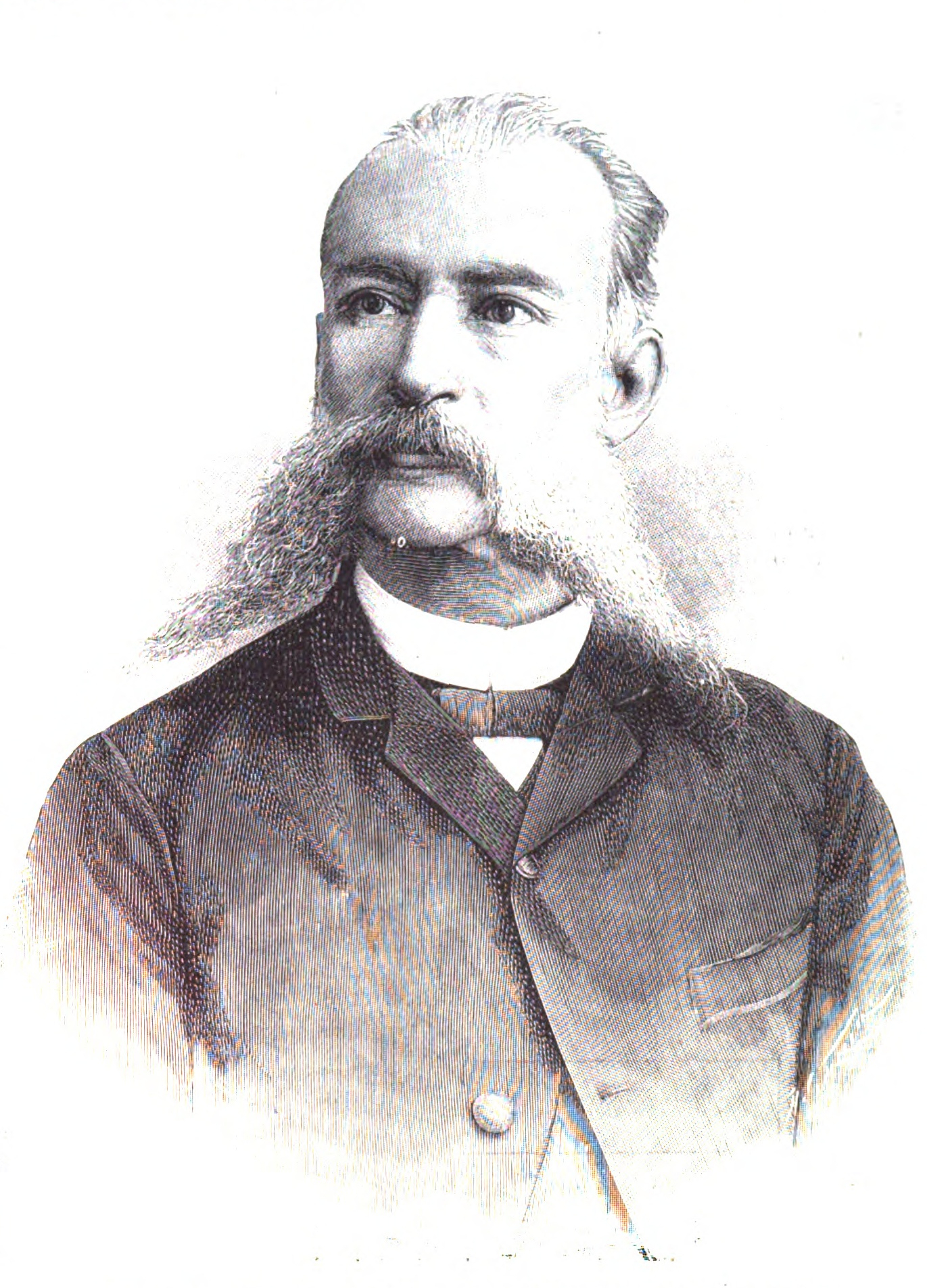
José María Gálvez was the Party President of the Autonomist Liberal Party, and a Freemason.

The Ten Years' War ended in 1878, and the Spanish government authorized the creation of political parties in Cuba. Most of the leadership of the Grand Lodge of Colon at Havana were founding members of the Autonomist Liberal Party. Antonio Govín y Torres himself became the Secretary of the Autonomist Liberal Party. José María Gálvez became the Party President. Rafael Montoro, the intellectual leader of the party, also served as the Worshipful Master of Logia Plus Ultra (English: Plus Ultra Lodge).

Other Freemasons became founding members of the Moderate Party of Cuba.

On October 8, 1878, discussions opened on merging the Lodges of Colon Freemasonry and Cuban Freemasonry into a new unified body.

The Little War occurred from 1879 to 1880.

On either January 25, 1880 or March 25, 1880, the Grand Lodge of Colon at Havana and the Grand Lodge of Cuba, and 46 of their Lodges, merged to become the Gran Logia Unida de Colón y la Isla de Cuba (English United Grand Lodge of Colon and the Island of Cuba). After decades of multiple Grand Lodges and Grand Orients on the island, there was now a single and unified Grand Loge for the entire island of Cuba, with one Grand Master and two Deputy Grand Masters. The United Grand Lodge gained recognition from 34 foreign Masonic bodies.

On September 4, 1881, 25 Lodges in Camagüey Province and Oriente Province accepted the authority and joined the United Grand Lodge. In 1881, seventy-one lodges operated in Cuba under the authority of the Grand Lodge.

In the city of Havana, which had a population of 200,000 people, less than 3,000 people regularly attended mass at the Catholic Church. In the wake of the declining Catholic Church, Freemasonry's impact on the island grew. Cuban Freemasons advanced scientific thought, modernized education, and provided an alternative Cuban identity in the vacuum of the Vatican's hegemony.

In the main cities, Masonic Lodges created and maintained public schools, libraries, and lecture halls. The three most prominent Lodges in Cuba during this period were Logia Amor Fraternal, Logia San Andrés, and Logia Plus Ultra. Claudio Justo Vermay (son of Jean-Baptiste Vermay), José Antonio Cortina, Rafael Fernández de Castro, and Enrique José Varona were all Freemasons in this period. The journal Revista Cubana was edited by José Antonio Cortina, and Revista de Cuba was edited by Enrique José Varona, where, alongside literature and society essays, they published Spanish translations of Charles Darwin and Hegel.

Joaquín Fabián Aenlle y Monjiotti, formerly the second-in-command at GOCA, became the Dean of the Faculty of Pharmacology at the University of Havana.

Rafael María de Mendive became a personal mentor to a young man named José Martí.

In 1886, Spain outlawed slavery in all of its territories.

The United Grand Lodge maintained a regular and correct authority until the outbreak of the Cuban War of Independence.

== Cuban War of Independence ==
=== Rise of the independence movement ===
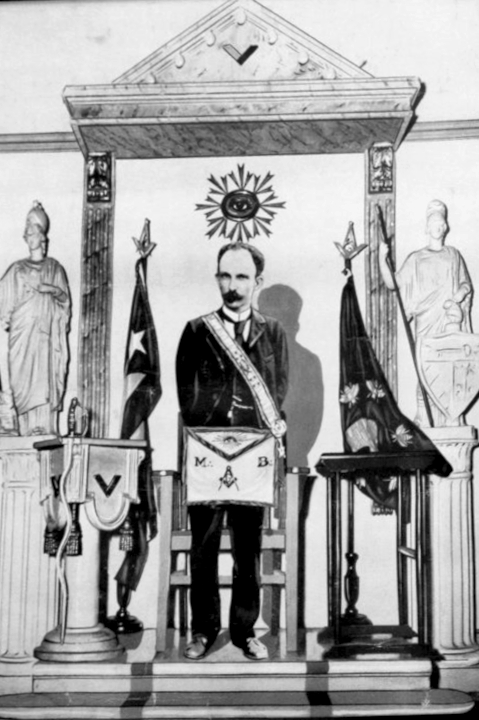
José Martí was another prominent Freemason who went by the Masonic codename Anahuac.

Most of the members of the former GOCA who had not died during the Ten Years War or the Little War went into exile abroad. Instead of maintaining close connections to the new United Grand Lodge, they regularized their degrees and joined into Lodges in Mexico, Honduras, Costa Rica, the Dominican Republic, Colombia, Jamaica, Haiti, and the United States. As a diaspora, they coordinated in the creation of the Cuban Revolutionary Party and the Cuban Junta. These diaspora Masons also created new Lodges, like the Francisco Vicente Aguilera Lodge and the Ignacio Agramonte Lodge in Florida.

Most of the leaders of the Cuban War of Independence were Freemasons, including José Martí, Antonio Maceo, and Máximo Gómez, but unlike during the Ten Years' War which had been directly instigated by GOCA Lodges and their leaders, a singular Freemasonic body was not directly responsible for the new Cuban Revolution. Instead, these Freemasons commingled with non-Masons and other average citizens to raise the funds, support, and armaments to fight against Spain.

Because political parties had been legalized in Cuba, revolutionaries no longer needed any place to meet entirely in secret to discuss the concept of independence. The conversation was happening in the open, and throughout all of Cuba and the Caribbean. Since they were allowed to gather at the Party headquarters, political parties took the place within the ideological niche that GOCA once held.

The Prime Minister of Spain at the time, Práxedes Mariano Mateo Sagasta y Escolar, was also a Freemason. It was also in Madrid, and not in Cuba, where José Martí was in the 1870s initiated as a Freemason into Logia Armonía (English: Harmony Lodge).

=== Wartime repression of Freemasonry ===
On April 4, 1895, the Spanish government of Captain General Emilio Calleja Isasi outlawed Freemasonry in Cuba.

=== Military Government of Cuba ===
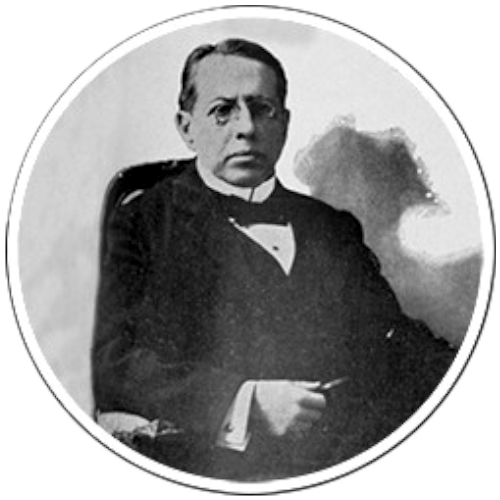
Juan Bautista Hernández Barreiro was elected Grand Master on March 26, 1899.

On January 1, 1899, after the United States defeated Spain at the end of the Spanish–American War and claimed Cuba as the Military Government of Cuba, Spaniards and the Spanish military left the islands of Cuba returning to mainland Spain, and any major influence of the Grand Lodge of Spain was taken with them. Both of the American Military Governors of Cuba, John R. Brooke and Leonard Wood, were high-ranking Freemasons, as was the President of the United States, William McKinley.

On the same day that the Spanish left, on January 1, individual Lodges across Cuba began meeting again regularly. Padilla Lodge was able to purchase an old industrial warehouse in Havana.

A mass immigration of US citizens to Cuba brought with it much closer coordination with the mainland American Lodges, and many of the highest-ranking US military government officials took a stance of cooperation with the Lodges in Cuba in order to completely restructure the Cuban Freemasonic system and purge it of Spanish aristocratic influence. These high-ranking officials included Admiral Schley, General Shafter, General Scott, Colonel Theodore Roosevelt and General George M. Moulton.

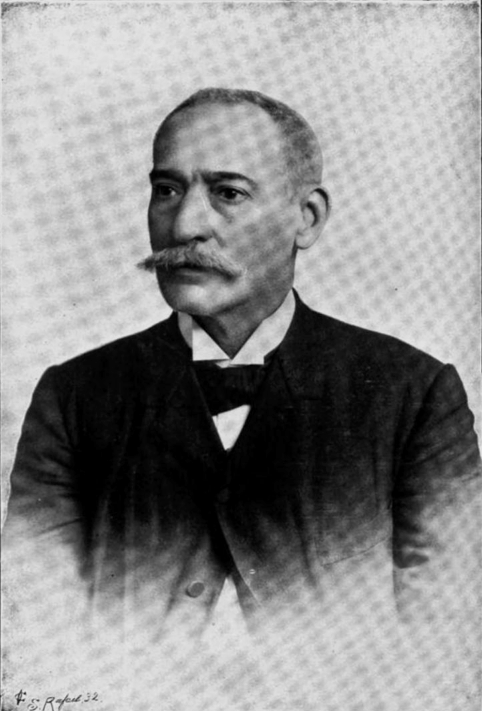
The famous women's suffragist, Miguel Gener, served as Grand Commander of the Supreme Council in February 1899.

The dominant narrative in the American Masonic histories for decades related that it was these American Freemasons who allowed Freemasonry to resurge in Cuba, but several modern historians write that it was the Cubans themselves who forced the resurgence, and the change in their government's approach to the nature of Freemasonry allowed them a sense of autonomy, rather than a complete dominance. Revolutionary GOCA exiles were allowed to return to the island, including its founder Aurelio Miranda y Álvarez, and Fernando Figueredo Socarrás. They met with Cuban Freemasons who had fought for independence in Cuba, such as José Fernández Pellón, Francisco de Paula Rodríguez, Gerardo L. Betancourt, Juan Bautista Hernández Barreiro, and Miguel Gener.

When Governor Brooke officially assumed office, Miguel Gener, the Grand Commander of the Supreme Council, offered his respects to the General, and committed to cooperation with the North American bodies of Freemasonry. Soon after this, Gener was appointed to the office of Mayor of Havana.

Freemasonry was "officially" reestablished in Cuba on February 5, 1899, when the Supreme Council of Colon and the Island of Cuba was reformed to become the Supreme Council of Cuba, which is the same Supreme Council that exists today. The United Grand Lodge of Colon and the Island of Cuba was reformed on March 26 to become the Grande Lodge of Cuba, at the same industrial property now owned by Padilla Lodge. Juan Bautista Hernández Barreiro was elected Grand Master, who simultaneously served as the government's Minister of Public Instruction. Later, he served as the Republic's Minister of Justice. The first Grand Secretary of the new Grand Lodge was Aurelio Miranda Álvarez, who went by the Masonic codename Irving.

The 1901 Constitution of Cuba, signed by many Freemasons, espoused many of the ideological views of the former GOCA and of the United Grand Lodge.

== Republic of Cuba and the Grand Lodge of Cuba ==
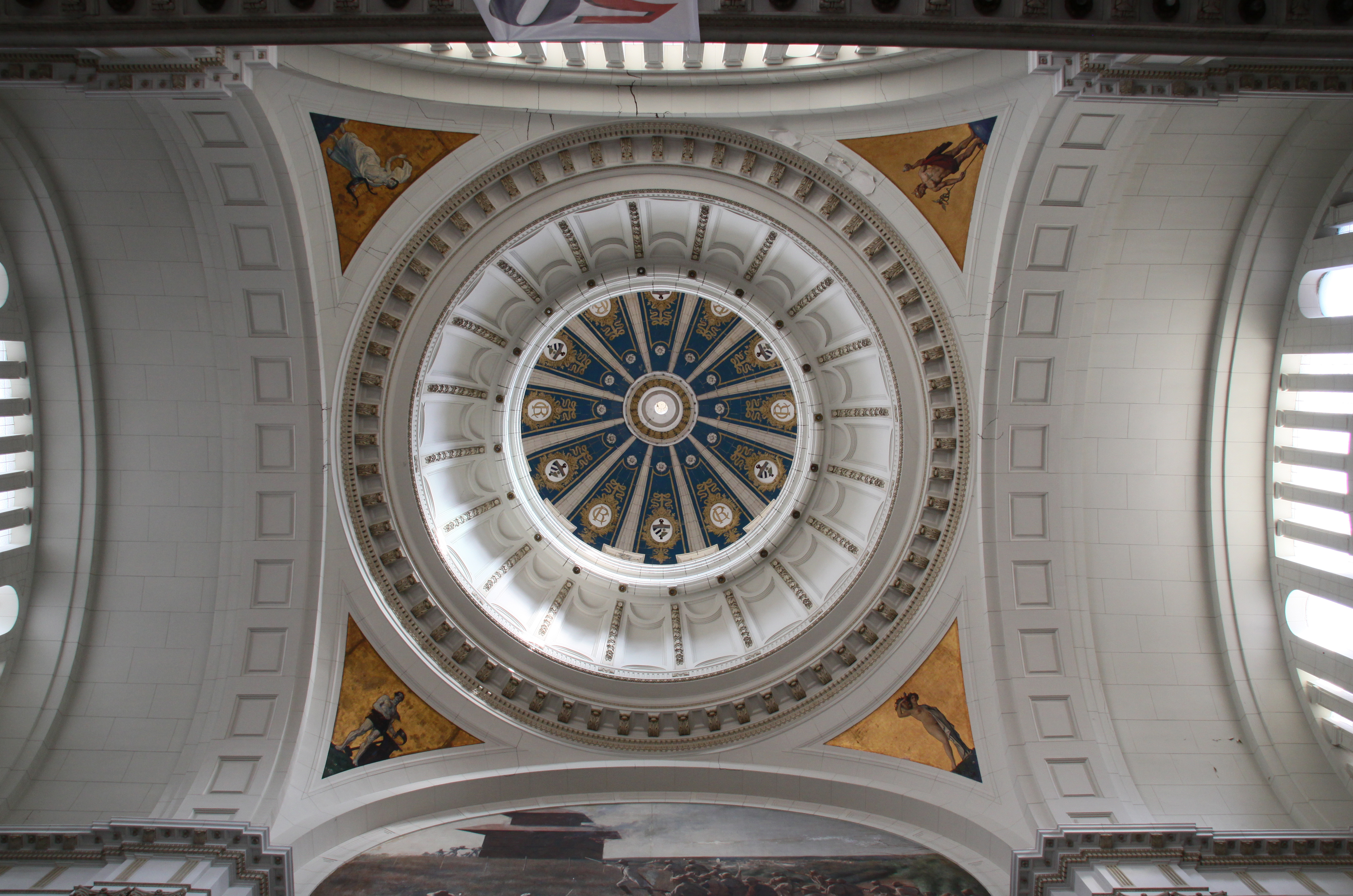
The gods Hermes and Minerva both appear on the ceiling of the dome of the Museum of the Revolution, which was formerly the Presidential Palace of Cuba, built circa 1913.

The first President of Cuba, Tomás Estrada Palma, was a Freemason. After his election in April 1902, he returned from exile to Cuba and went on a tour of the island's Masonic Lodges.

On May 20, 1902, the Cuban flag was raised for the first time on its own, without the American Flag flying next to it. The next day, on May 21, General Máximo Gómez placed that same exact flag in a wooden chest and handed the chest to Grand Master José Fernández Pellón Castellanos, to ceremonially honor the sacrifices that Cuban Freemasons had made, and the efforts that Cuban Freemasonry had contributed to the creation of an independent Cuba.

Freemasonry steadily grew across Cuba.

New Masonic Temples were erected across the island, and a Masonic Band was created. Freemasons largely returned to the normal work of charity; schools were built, shoes were dispensed to children in need, an ambulance was given to a hospital, hurricane relief funds were gathered for Puerto Rico and other islands, medical procedures were funded, and a dental dispensary was created.

Four entirely English-speaking Lodges were established in communities that had been established by American colonists to the island; Island Lodge in Havana, Landmark Lodge in Camagüey, Kane Lodge in Banes, and Santa Fe Lodge on the Isle of Pines. By 1953, there were 400 English-speaking members across these English language Lodges.

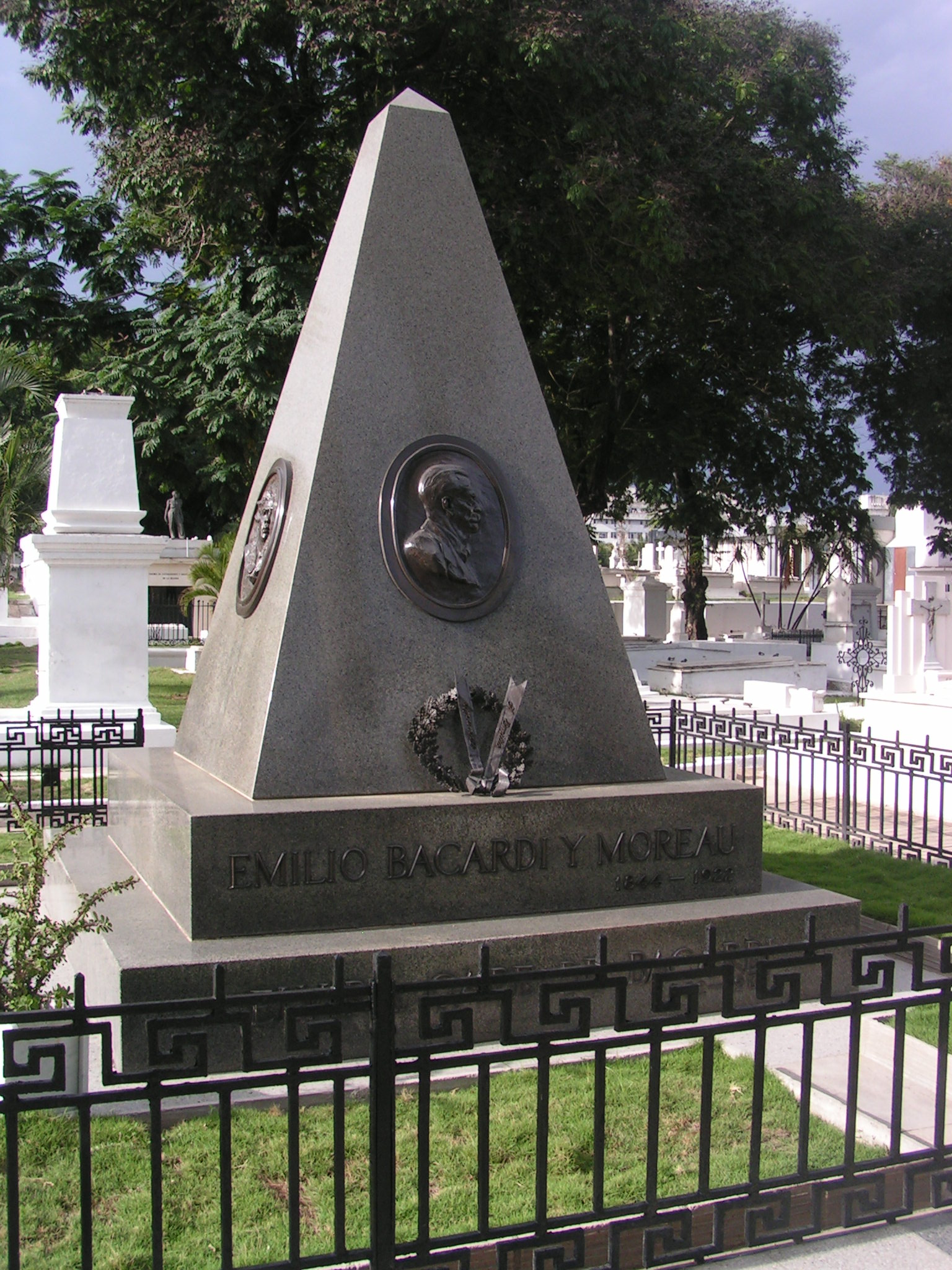
Grave of Emilio Bacardi at Santa Ifigenia Cemetery.

By 1906, there were 61 Lodges in Cuba. Independent Lodges who did not desire to recognize the authority of the Grand Lodge still existed in the Eastern half of the island. The Grand Lodge of Cuba considered these Lodges to be clandestine and irregular, completely unwilling to "...submit to Masonic law and cooperate to maintain the high reputation which Cuban Masonry has won after years of struggle..."

Between 1902 and 1905, fifty thousand Spaniards from the Iberian Peninsula gained citizenship and residency in the new Cuba. Some of these were willing to join the Grand Lodge of Cuba.

=== Second Military Occupation ===
Estrada Palma's presidency ended with the Little August War and his resignation in 1906. This began the Provisional Government of Cuba, a second period of military occupation by the United States in Cuba lasting until 1909. President Theodore Roosevelt was a highly active Freemason, but his first Provisional Governor William Howard Taft would not be initiated until 1909, several years after Taft left the country. No evidence exists to suggest that Taft was involved in the Brotherhood at this time. His successor, Charles Edward Magoon, was never a Freemason.

In the 1908 Cuban general election, both of the leading Presidential candidates, from opposing political parties, were Freemasons; José Miguel Gómez of the Liberal Party, and Rafael Montoro, of the Conservative Party. They were featured on the cover of the Grand Lodge's bi-weekly magazine, La Gran Logia. From the leadership of the new independent Cuba had emerged two oppositional political ideologies for its direction, and the Grand Lodge of Cuba was then fractured in the same manner. A large portion of the Freemasonic leadership in Cuba promoted that "Masonic virtue," should be the guiding light for all of Cuba, not just for Freemasons. Like a half-century earlier, debates about if Freemasons should be involved in politics raged.

On March 22, 1908, Grand Master Fernando Figueredo Socarás published a message complaining that the political situation in Cuba was hindering the work of the Grand Lodge, and that it had "corrupted everything, including Freemasonry... The August War has disrupted our august institution as a component part of society." The political chaos on the island, he said, was being reflected in its Freemasonry.

In an issue of La Gran Logia on August 1, 1908, the writer J. M. Aramburu wrote: "Freemasonry is destined to play a very important role as an essential moderating power for young nations, as the Cuban nation was perceived by many politicians of their time. I cannot conceive that three thousand Freemasons cannot dominate, guide, and govern, for the good, three million ignorant souls.... The purification of the national soul has not been achieved... simply because Cuban Freemasonry does not want it... The defects of Freemasonry have allowed the misfortunes of the nation."

=== Return to the Republic ===
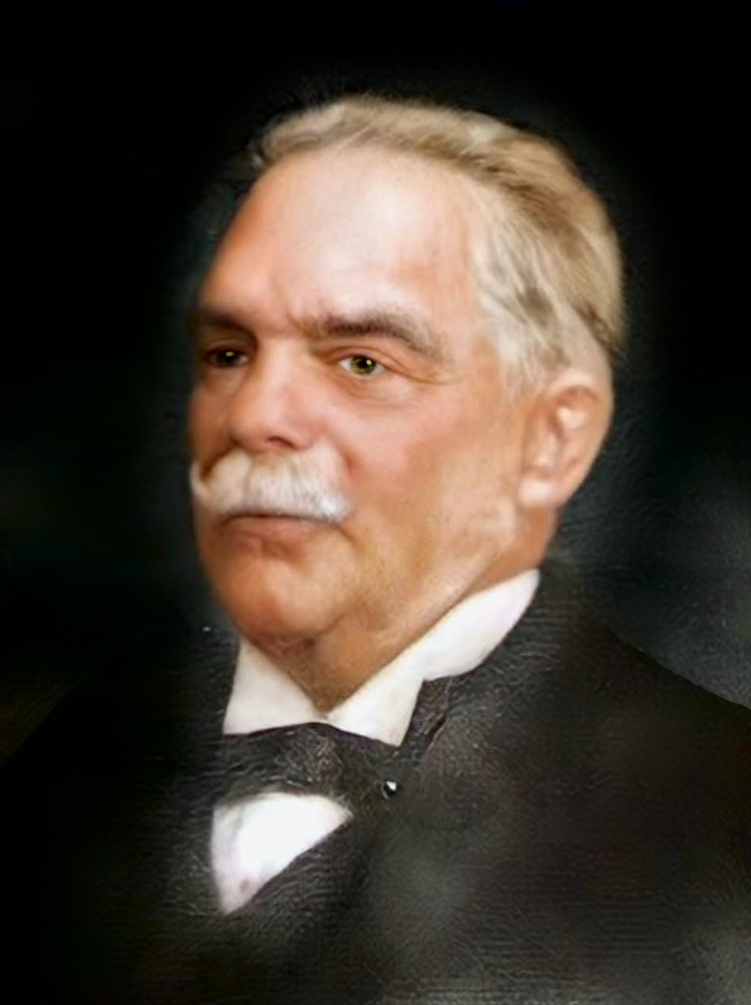
Francisco Sánchez Curbelo was the Grand Master of the Grand Lodge of Cuba from 1912 to 1919. He guided the Grand Lodge through the War of 1912, the Chambelona War, and Cuba during World War I.

Shortly after the end of the Provisional Government, in 1910, formal relations between Cuba and Spain were resumed.

In October 1912, the Grand Commander of the Supreme Council, Manuel S. Castellanos, and the Freemason Luther S. Harvey, travelled to Washington, D.C., to attend the International Conference of Supreme Councils.

During the runup to the 1912 Cuban general election, the Lodges of Cuba were once again subjected to internal divisions motivated by the political reality. That year, José Fernández Pellón Castellanos and the Jurisprudence Commission released a statement which the Grand Lodge, and Freemasonry, specifically forbade the practice of politics in the Lodge. At the same time, Grand Master Francisco Sánchez Curbelo was in the election to become a representative in the Cuban House of Representatives, and in an issue of La Gran Logia, Aurelio Miranda tacitly expressed his desire that Freemasons should vote for him. At the quarterly meeting of the High Chamber of the Grand Lodge of Cuba, the President of the High Chamber, Valdés Codina presided over a proposal: "To recommend to all the lodges of the obedience, so that they in turn may recommend to the members of all their columns, the supreme convenience of each one casting his vote for the masons who are nominated, whatever the party or group that nominates him."

In a public response to the calls to elect Grand Master Francisco Sánchez Curbelo, he replied: "...It is necessary to Respect everyone, listen to everyone,... may our temples be true harmonious ensembles of moral peace, civic education, and constant example for the work of good, which are so necessary in the current times that our Republic is going through... Not only the fulfillment of our Masonic duties, but the satisfaction as citizens of a Free homeland, to which we lend our selfless support, for the strengthening of republican institutions."

On September 27, 1921, the Upper House of the Grand Lodge integrated the Association of Veteran Masons into its structure, where it had been an independent constituent of Cuban Freemasonry since 1893.

In 1947, the Grand Lodge and the Supreme Council ratified the Treaty of Friendship and Mutual Recognition.

On September 15, 1949, Grand Master Carlos M. Piñeiro y del Cueto issued Decree No. 284, creating the Cuban Academy of High Masonic Studies.

In 1936, there were 195 Lodges in Cuba. From 1945 to 1959, the membership of Freemasonry in Cuba had doubled. By 1959, there were over 34,000 Freemasons in Cuba. By the time of the collapse of the Republic of Cuba, the Grand Lodge of Cuba maintained 400 regular Lodges.

=== Supreme Court of Masonic Justice ===
A commission of the High Chamber of the Grand Lodge, called the Masonic Judicial Commission, met regularly when the Grand Lodge was established, but by the 1920s, the Grand Lodge understood the need to create a more functional and structured system to decide Masonic Law.

Around 1936, the Cuban Supreme Court of Masonic Justice was created. This court was "...composed of magistrates of established prestige and authority." Francisco Sánchez Curbelo, having served as the President of the Masonic Judicial Commission since 1923, was then appointed as the first serving President of the Supreme Court of Masonic Justice.

=== Llansó National Masonic Retirement Home ===
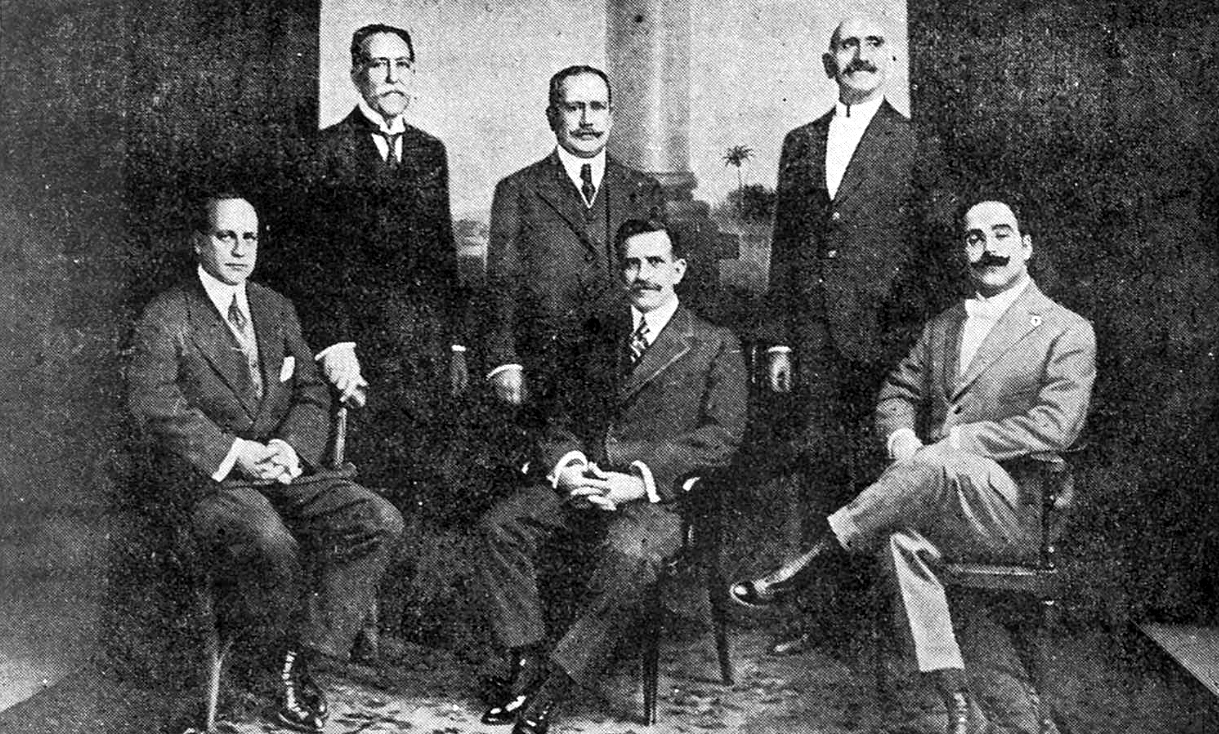
First Board of Directors of the Mercy National Masonic Asylum, seen here in 1918.Sitting in an unknown order: President Enrique Enrique Llansó y Simoni, First Vice President Enrique Varela y Cárdenas, Second Vice President Luis M. Sabater del Pozo, Accountant José M. Estapé y Pagés, Treasurer Pablo Yodú y Hernández, Secretary Antonio Conejo y Caro.

In February 1918, the management of the Asilo La Misericordia (English: Mercy Asylum), a homeless shelter which the Grand Lodge had taken possession of the year prior, made the $16,500 purchase of a 16,500 square-meter (one dollar per m2) plot of land at kilometer marker 9 of the Arroyo Naranjo Highway, near the entrance of Arroyo Naranjo. The entire Board of Trustees and the Economic and Administrative Council of Mercy Shelter were all Freemasons. The first Director of the Board after the Freemasons acquired the shelter was Dr. Enrique Enrique Llansó y Simoni.

On August 13, 1918, the Council met in session, where they changed the name of the shelter to Asilo Nacional Masónico La Misericordia (English: Mercy National Masonic Asylum). They altered the bylaws, the statues and regulations, and the structure of the institution to more closely align with Freemasonic values.

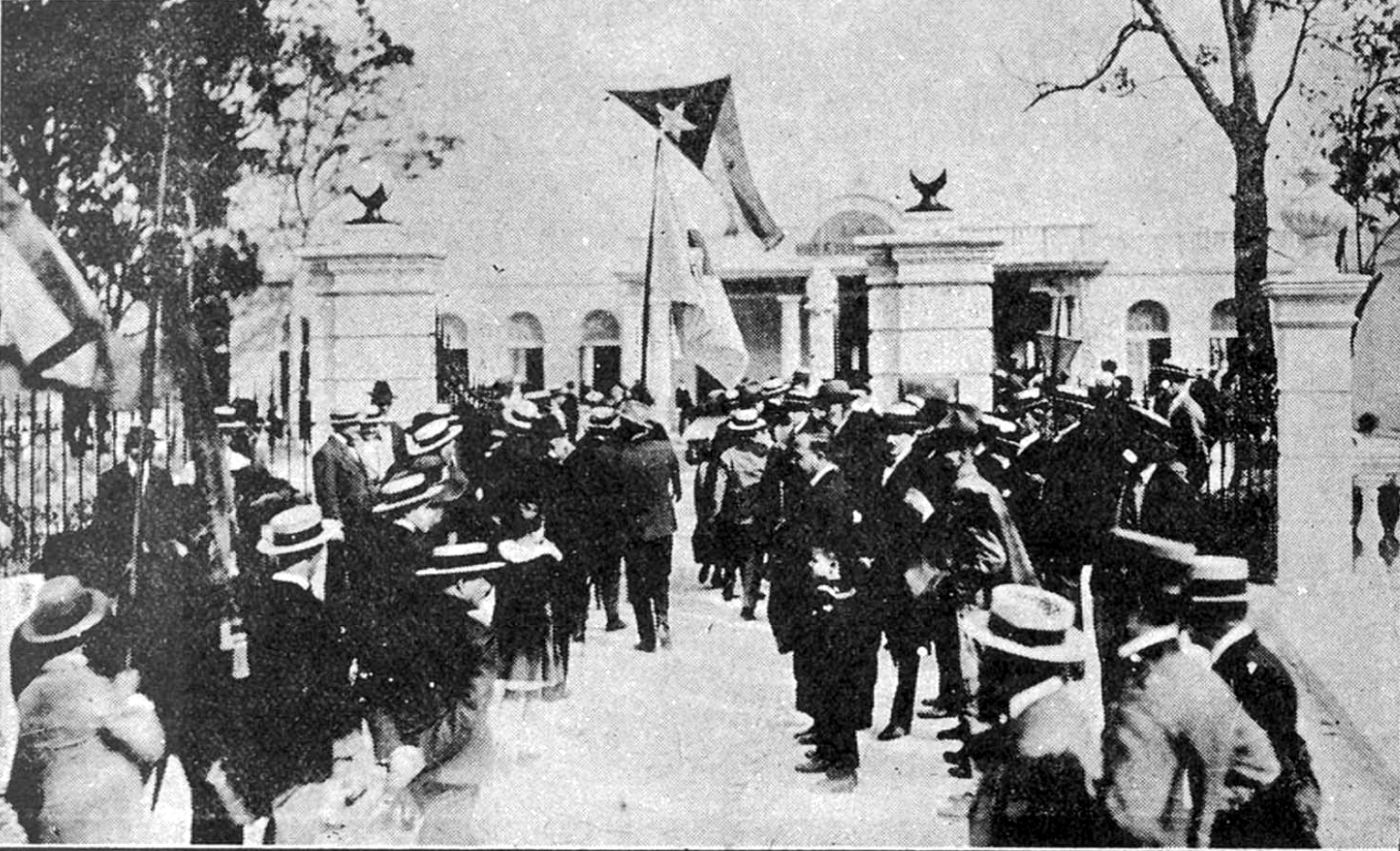
Opening ceremony at the main entrance of the Mercy National Masonic Asylum.

Construction was interrupted by Cuba's involvement in World War I, but it was completed on February 9, 1920. On opening day, hundreds of visitors from around Havana and the surrounding areas came to tour the facility, including the Provincial Governor of Havana, Colonel Alberto Barreras, who was also a Freemason. Governor Barrearas oversaw a twelve gun salute and a performance of La Bayamesa by the General Staff Band. Three flags were raised; the flag of Cuba, the flag of the Supreme Council of Cuba, and the flag of the Grand Lodge of Cuba.

Priority was given to Freemasons, but anyone could apply for housing here. There were only four rules needed to become a resident here: Residents had to be someone who needed public charity to live, "...even if they got there through vices." Residents had to be homeless. If the resident wasn't a Freemason, they needed to have letters of recommendation. All residents needed to pay up to 100 dollars to secure housing.

As the years went by, the name "Asilo," or Asylum, became increasingly problematic. The original business model of the Mercy Asylum under its previous owners from 1886 had been to take beggars off of the street and put them into the shelter. As Cuba's new sphere of academia and the social welfare science studies advanced, earlier common practices in charity and relief work were radically transformed. Around the world, people began associating the term asylum with places like Bellevue Hospital and Bethlem Royal Hospital, and the Freemasons wanted to avoid that association.

On July 5, 1932, to honor the memory of the recently deceased Dr. Llansó, the name was changed again to the Hogar Nacional Masónico Llansó (English: Llansó National Masonic Retirement Home), and its mission was changed from being a homeless shelter to that of a retirement home and hospice for the elderly.

=== National Masonic Temple of the Grand Lodge of Cuba ===
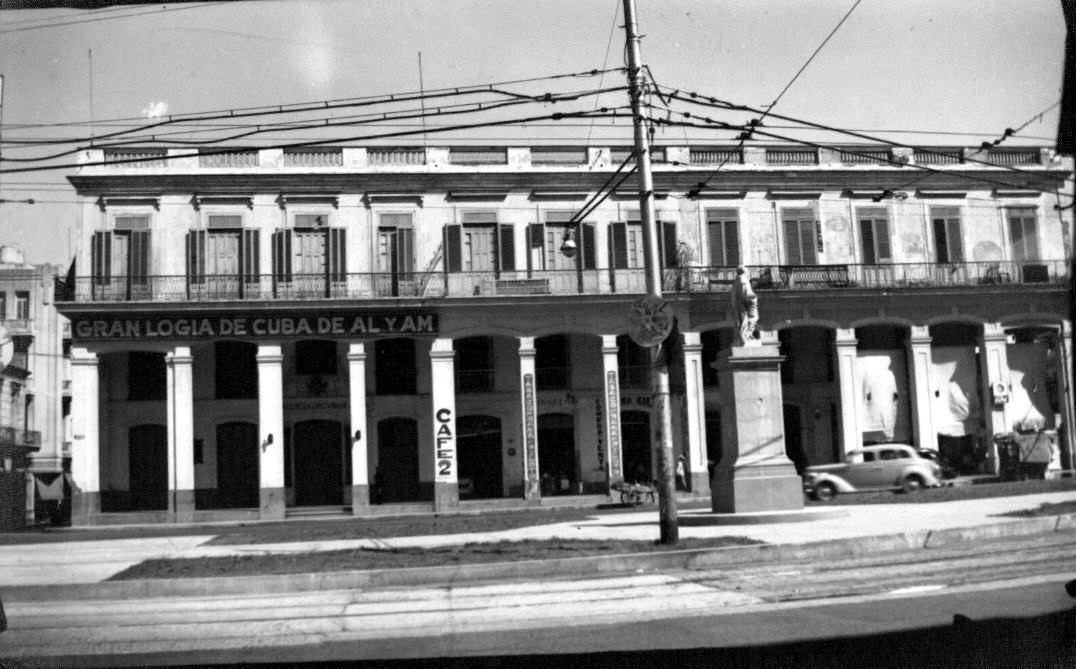
The Grand Lodge of Cuba was headquartered in this building from 1908 to 1951. It was demolished in 1951.

From 1908 to 1951, the Grand Lodge of Cuba was headquartered out of a building on the corner of Avenida de Carlos III (English: Carlos III Avenue) and Calle Santiago (English: Santiago Street) in Centro Habana. In 1945, they bought the building next to them, and in 1948, they bought the rest of the block. In 1951, the Grand Lodge began construction on their new headquarters building.

The building, at the cross sections of those streets that were once called Belascoaín, Carlos III, Fraternidad, and Pocito, is at 508 Avenida de Carlos III (English: Carlos III Avenue). To level the ground beneath the Temple, loads of soil and sand were brought in from each of the Six Provinces of Cuba and many of their major rivers; Camagüey Province, Havana Province, Las Villas Province, Matanzas Province, Oriente Province, and Pinar del Río Province.

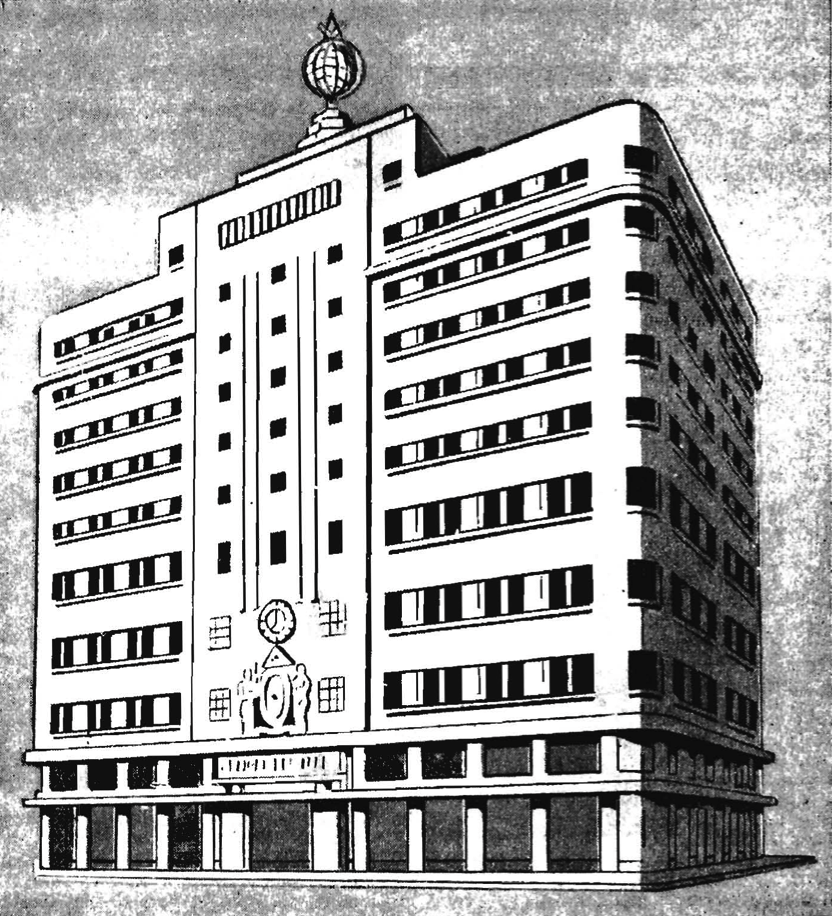
On February 27, 1955, the National Masonic Temple of Cuba opened in Havana, at the Third Inter-American Masonic Conference.

The building's cornerstone was laid on March 25, 1951, by Grand Master Carlos M. Piñero y del Cueto and the building's architect, Emilio Vasconcelos Frayde. Costs for the construction were made possible by voluntary donations donations from the Grand Lodge and Supreme Council of Cuba, and the Daughters of Acacia. A delegate from the Grand Lodge of Pennsylvania, upon seeing the Temple, wrote: "The cost of the temple was approximately US$4,000,000, and when we realize that there are but 31,700 Masons in Cuba, one can fully realize what a magnificent undertaking was brought to completion."

On February 27, 1955, the National Masonic Temple of Cuba was officially inaugurated during the Third Inter-American Conference of Symbolic Freemasonry. At the consecration ceremony, Grand Master Carlos M. Piñeiro del Cueto said: "The consecration of the National Masonic Temple stands as a bulwark in the struggle for the freedom of all peoples and the dignity of mankind."

At a height of eleven floors, it was at one time the second-tallest building on the entire island of Cuba.

On the day that it was inaugurated, two floors were being rented-out to businesses unrelated to Freemasonry. The tenth floor acted as the law offices of the law firm owned by the Grand Master, and to avoid commingling, when he needed to do business as a lawyer, he would sit in his office on the tenth floor, but when he needed to act as the Grand Master, he would walk upstairs to the Office of the Grand Master.

=== Third Inter-American Conference of Symbolic Freemasonry ===
==== Arrival of the delegates ====
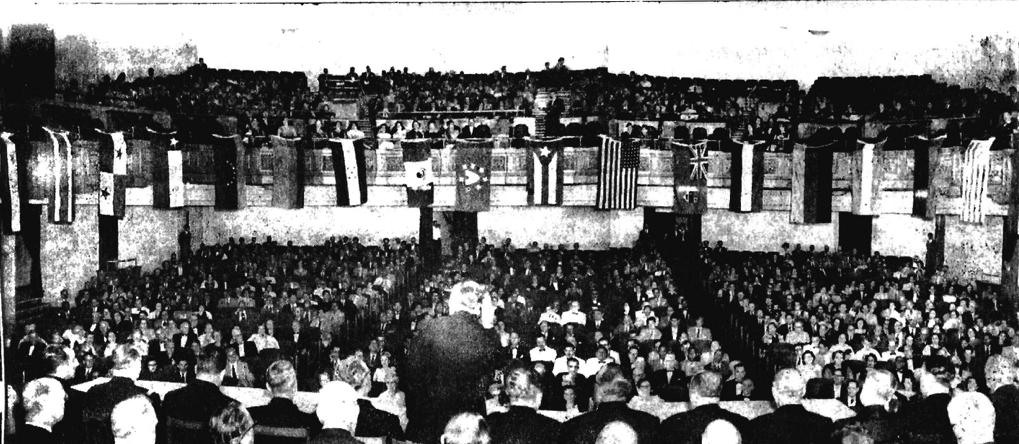
Third Inter-American Conference of Symbolic Masonry.

"It was of interest to learn there is no race discrimination in the Grand Lodge of Cuba. In many cases Negroes carried the Lodge banner. There was a generous sprinkling of Negroes and Chinese parading with their lodges."

~ Delegate from the Grand Lodge of Pennsylvania

The Inter-American Conference of Symbolic Masonry was an international gathering of Freemasons from around the world for the member Grand Lodges and Orients of the Inter-American Masonic Confederation (CMI). The First Inter-American Conference of Symbolic Masonry was hosted in Montevideo in 1947. The second was hosted in Mexico City in 1951. The third was held in Havana.

From February 25 to March 8, 1955, Freemasonic delegations from Europe, Asia, and America (e.g.; North America and South America), and their families, landed at Havana to participate in the Third Inter-American Conference of Symbolic Freemasonry. When the delegations arrived at Havana Airport on Friday the 25th, at different prearranged times, they were greeted by the Cuban Marine Corps Band which marched onto the airfield and played the national anthems of the delegations, before they were brought to their hotel for the conference, the Sevilla Biltmore. That night, the delegations were given time to become acquainted with the city of Havana. The delegation from the United States enjoyed an evening at the Tropicana.

==== Opening reception at Havana Auditorium ====
At 8:30pm on Saturday, February 26, an evening reception was held at the Havana Auditorium in Vedado, with an opening keynote speech from Grand Master Carlos M. Piñeiro del Cueto. Civil and military authorities of the Republic of Cuba also sat at the head of the reception. Grand Master Piñeiro expressed: "...the profound emotion, the sincere feeling that Cuban Freemasonry... is experiencing at this moment for having gathered so many fraternal values into a solid and tightly knit bundle." A colour guard from the Boy Scouts of Cuba carried the flags of each country represented at the conference and planted them on the stage. The Grand Master's own daughter, Luisa María Piñeiro y Cresno, carried the flag of the CMI. Alfonso Poletti then spoke on behalf of the Mexican delegation. Charles Mantz, Grand Master of the Grand Lodge of Colorado, spoke on behalf of the United States and the Conference of Grand Masters of North America.

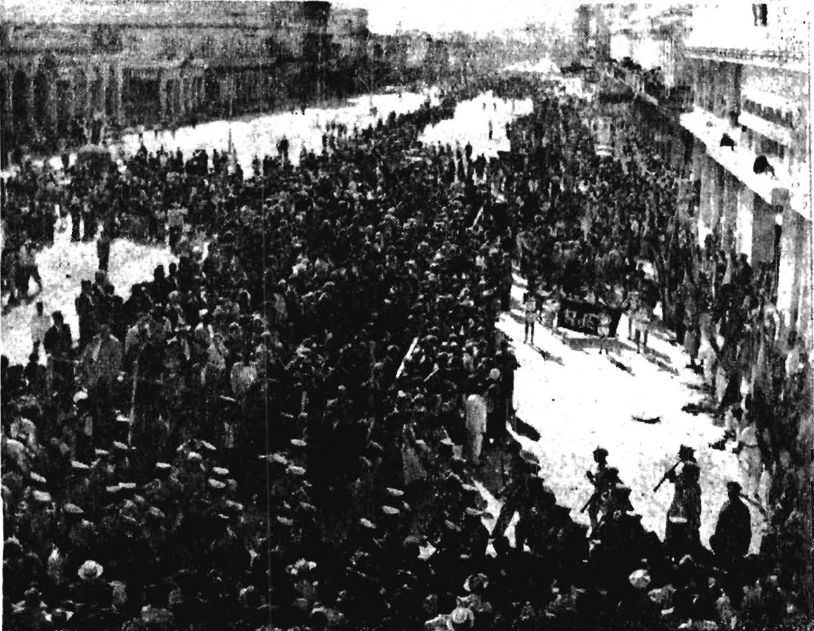
Parade marched on Sunday down Avenida Carlos III

Gifts were presented to the Grand Lodge of Cuba from the various delegations. Brother Winslow, from the United States, presented a ceremonial folded American flag as a gift, and read from a handwritten letter by Freemason and former President of the United States, Harry S. Truman. In the letter, the Truman apologized that he could not attend the event due to poor health, but said that he was with them in spirt, wishing them good fortune and prosperity. The Grand Lodge of Chile presented a group of sculptures, including a prominent sculpture of Bernardo O'Higgins riding victorious on a sorrel horse. The Grand Lodge of Florida presented a plaque that would be installed in the lobby of the National Masonic Temple.

The delegation from the Grand Lodge of Pennsylvania brought out the original Charter of the Temple of the Theologic Virtues No. 103, written in 1804, of which they had kept safeguarded in their custody at the archives of the Masonic Temple in Philadelphia since 1821.

Jorge Luis Cuervo Calve gave the closing speech. In it, he explained that Cuban Freemasons had led the charge to free Cuba from viscous dictators. Freemasonry itself guided them to independence and liberty. He told the history of Cuban Freemasonry "without omitting any detail." Then, he specifically thanked the delegation from Chile for being there that night, and emphasized their fraternal bonds. He then ended by stating that the spirit of the Mambises was still alive and well in the Grand Lodge of Cuba.

==== Sunday, conference day ====
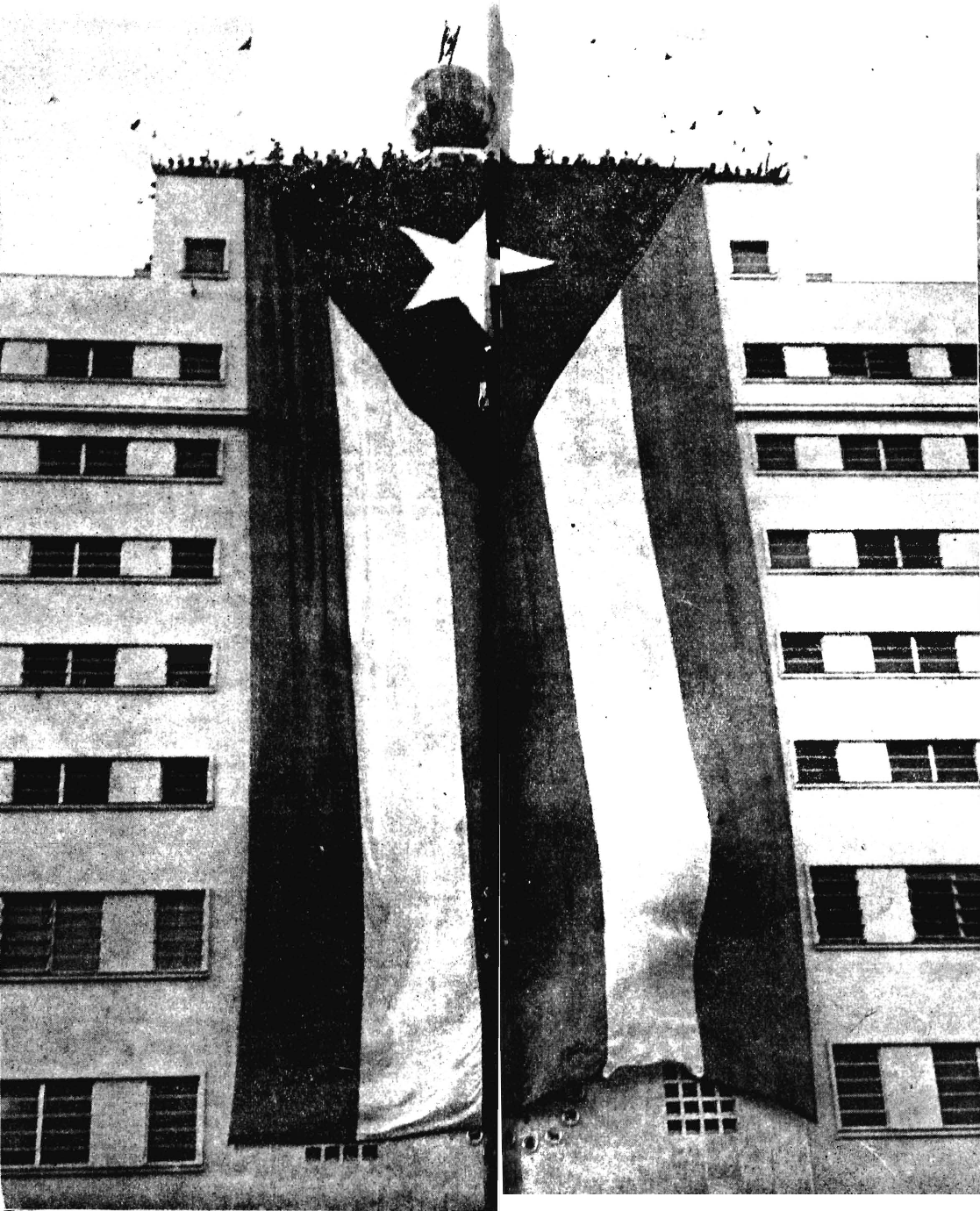
Cuban flag being unfurled by members of the AJEF at the opening of the Masonic Temple

Sunday, February 27, 1955, began with some delegations on a tour of Morro Castle. After this, a parade proceeded down Avenida Carlos III from Infanta Street to Belascoaín. 40,000 people from Havana lined the streets to watch the parade go by. A grandstand reserved for visiting Freemasons with seating for 1,000 people was placed in front of the Masonic Temple.

The flags of each country present were raised on flagpoles in front of the Masonic Temple. A rouse of applause was heard from the crowds of people in the street as they saw the flags raised. A large Cuban flag 30 meters (98 feet) long, gifted by the Cuban Young Hope Association (AJEF), was then unfurled and draped over the side of the Masonic Temple. The flag ceremonies were conducted by an Ajefista Commission of the AJEF.

The consecration of the National Masonic Temple of the Grand Lodge of Cuba was overseen by Grand Master Carlos M. Piñeiro del Cueto and his secretariat. With a ribbon cutting, members of the public and Cuban Freemasons were allowed to see the building and walk around.

The Freemasons moved into the High Chamber of the Grand Lodge, where the Third Inter-American Conference of Symbolic Freemasonry officially took place. Alejandro Poletti from the delegation of Mexico presided over the conference, but because of a recent accident he could not speak well. Alejandro Serani Burgos, from the Grand Lodge of Chile, spoke for some time, explaining more about the significance of the group of statues that the Chilean delegation had brought from Cuba, which were an exact replica of those located on the Alameda. He explained the importance of O'Higgins and his horse walking over the corpse of a dead enemy tyrant's soldier.

The Cuban Army General Staff Band played El Mambi and La Bayamesa.

The delegation from the Dominican Republic reminded the room that Máximo Gómez had been born in their country, and had died in Cuba.

After a prayer to the Great Architect of the Universe, the Conference conducted its normal business.

==== Conference executives meet with Batista ====
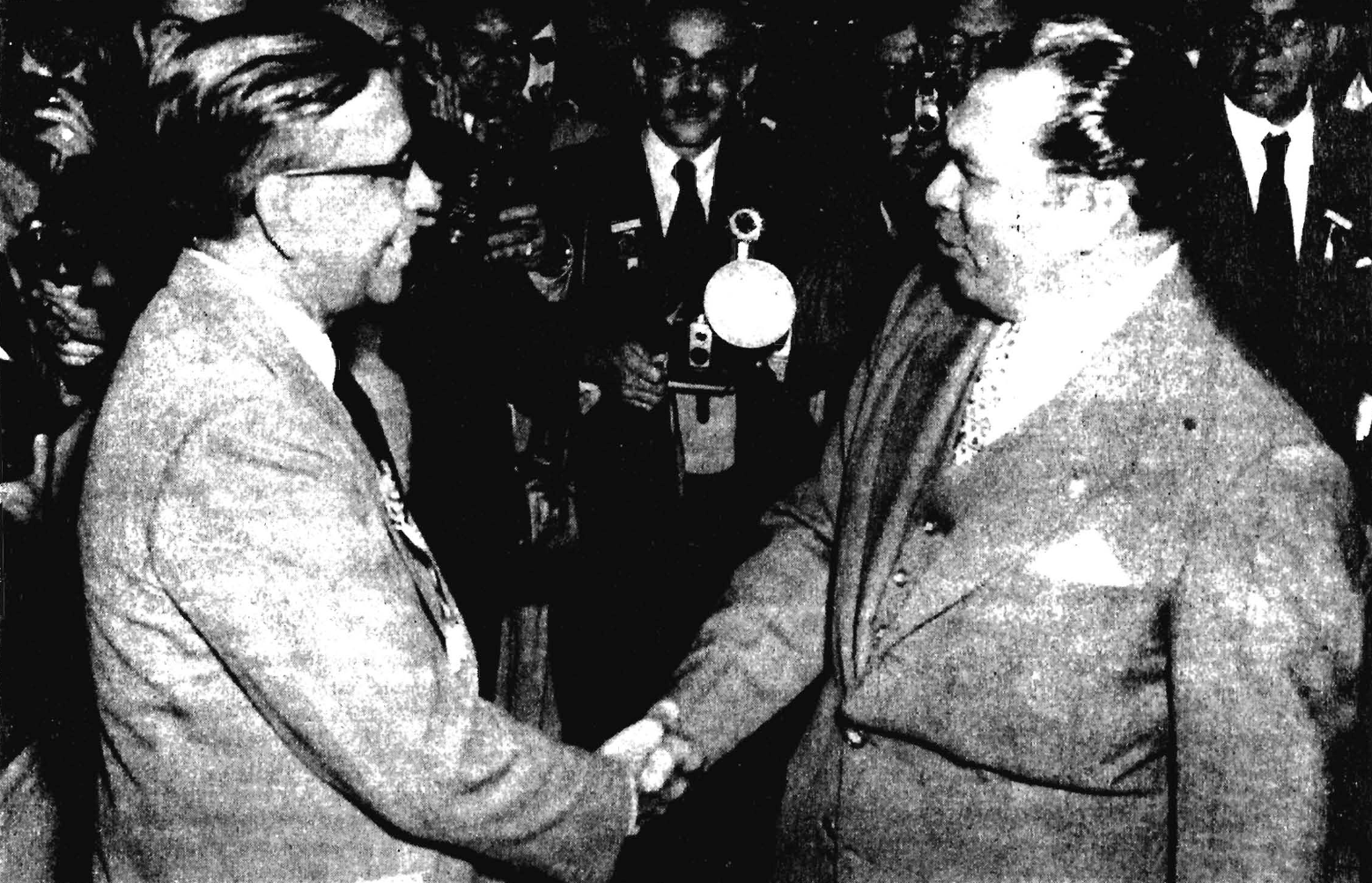
Grand Master of the Grand Lodge of Cuba, Dr. Carlos M. Piñeiro del Cueto (left), shakes hands with President of Cuba, Fulgencio Batista (right)

On March 2, 1955, a group of executives from the delegations of the conference gathered at the Hall of Mirrors in the Presidential Palace, where they were received by President Fulgencio Batista. The group included the Grand Officers of the Grand Lodge of Cuba, the Grand Master of Cuba, and executive officers from CMI. Also present were Minister of Agriculture Andrés Domingo Morales del Castillo, and Fidel Barreto. They shook hands with Batista. Batista thanked them for their work, and praised the executives for the smooth success of the conference.

President Batista offered his congratulations on the consecration of the Masonic Temple, and admitted that he thought it was "...a majestic structure rising on the city.... [it] stands as a source of legitimate pride not only for Cuban Freemasonry but for that of the entire American continent." Batista pledged that he would assist the Grand Lodge of Cuba wherever he could.

He noted, "...in accordance with Masonic principles..." that his Presidential Administration would be dedicated to the preserving freedom of expression, the free interplay of ideas in society and in the economic spheres, fraternity among Cubans, and equality between men and women, regardless of class. He also said that he would be dedicated to "...fostering a genuine climate of national integration in keeping with the circumstances that compelled our forebears who ventured into the liberating wilderness in pursuit of freedom from colonial rule, to bequeath to us a free and independent Cuba."

Grand Master Piñeiro del Cueto told President Batista that: "Freemasonry in Cuba will always remain dedicated to its specific mission; working, in accordance with its tenets, to shape the future of the world's peoples while upholding the motto of Liberty, Equality, and Fraternity."

=== Other rites and bodies ===
==== Royal Arch Masonry ====
On February 19, 1907, Royal Arch Masonry Island Chapter No. 1 was established and granted dispensation by the General Grand Chapter of Royal Arch Masonry. On April 4, 1907, the Companions of Island Chapter No. 1 created Island Chapter U. D. On December 17, 1907, it was officially constituted under Marcus Endel, the past Grand High Priest of Florida.

In 1909, High Priest R. B. Armour and the King of the Chapter U. D. visited the headquarters of the General Grand Chapter and received the charter of Island Chapter No. 1.

By 1951, there were 153 members of Royal Arch Masonry in Cuba.

==== Royal and Select Masters ====
Sometime before 1953, a Council of the Order of Royal and Select Masters was established in Cuba.

==== Grand Encampment ====
In 1914, the Grand Master of the Grand Encampment of the Knights Templar in the United States, Joseph K. Orr, visited Havana, where he found 50 members of the fraternity. In 1921, he authorized the formation of a Commandery and issued dispensation to the Havana Commandery U. D., K. T., where Walter M. Daniels was made Commander. General George M. Moulton made an inspection of the ranks, and the Havana Commandery received its charter on April 27, 1922.

By 1951, they had 91 members.

==== Daughters of Acacia ====
The Daughters of Acacia (Spanish: Orden Hijas de Acacia) was established by the wife of a prominent Freemason on March 21, 1936. These were Lodges designed for women and independent of the men's Lodges, but with the same degrees and ideals as the men's program.

==== Young Fraternal Hope Association ====
In March 1929, the Grand Lodge of Cuba created a youth organization called the Young Fraternal Hope Association (AJEF) (Spanish: Asociación de Jóvenes Esperanza de la Fraternidad), whose original charter was valid until February 1936. On February 9, 1936, through the efforts of its founder Fernando Suárez Núñez, AJEF established its first Lodge, Logia Esperanza. AJEF comprised young men ages 14 to 21, and in time, it spread beyond Cuba, into Mexico and South America.

== Cuban Revolution ==
“Is Fidel Castro a Freemason?” I asked him. He laughed.
“Perhaps,” he said, blowing a cloud of smoke.
“Who knows? Raúl certainly is.”

~ EXUTOPIA, 2016

It is unknown whether Fidel Castro was ever initiated as a Freemason and this subject is hotly debated among historians, but the fact remains that Logia Artemisa No. 38 (English: Artemis Lodge), today known as Logia Evolucion (English: Evolution Lodge), became a military training area and a meeting space to discuss revolutionary activities. At the Artemis Lodge, Freemasons, members of the A. J. E. F., and Fidel Castro, Pastorita Núñez and other revolutionaries planned the Attack on the Moncada Barracks in 1953. Before Fidel arrived, Ramón Pez Ferro turned off all the lights in the Temple and set up the three traditional lights of Freemasonry in the Masonic ara.

The Masonic folkloric tradition of Cuba today maintains that during the height of the Cuban Revolution in 1956, when Fidel Castro and Raúl Castro landed the yacht Granma in Oriente Province, Fidel and Raúl were hidden from the government of Fulgencio Batista by a Masonic Lodge in the Sierra Maestra mountains. According to the story, it was here, in the Sierra Maestra Lodge, that Fidel Castro conceived of the 26th of July Movement. That summer, according to the Masonic tradition, Fidel and Raúl Castro were also initiated as Freemasons.

=== Grand Lodge of Cuba in Exile ===
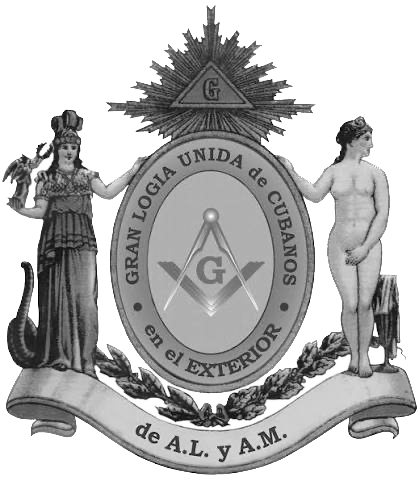
The Grand Lodge of Cuba in Exile kept their Coat of Arms and slightly altered some details. This led to a trademark lawsuit in the 1960s.

When the Communist revolution successfully overthrew the dictatorial government of Fulgencio Batista, the Grand Lodge of Cuba suspended all of its activities. According to Grand Master Juan Tarajano-Gonzales, Castro's government seized the Masonic Temple in Havana, after which Grand Master Tarajano-Gonzalez and Grand Secretary Eduardo R. Lopez Bobadilla fled the country to seek exile in Florida.

Spanish descendants in the Masonic exile community with lighter skin tones successfully integrated into Miami, but more trouble was faced by those Afrocuban black and mixed-race members living in the Deep South during the era of Racial segregation in the United States. Where Freemasonry in Cuba had allowed black members since 1868, some of the Lodges in the United States did not allow nonwhite members.

"So, again, in Cuba political events are shaping the destiny of Freemasonry, and we find two Grand Lodges, each claiming to be the regular Grand Lodge, and each with legitimate reasons to sustain its claim."

~ Warren H. Murphy, 1968

After escaping to Florida, Tarajano-Gonzalez issued a declaration that any activities of the Grand Lodge of Cuba would be considered "irregular" and "unlawful" according to their own Masonic tradition, and established the Grand Lodge of Cuba in Exile (Spanish: Gran Logia de Cuba En el Exterior), within the territorial jurisdiction of the Grand Lodge of Florida. They claimed that it was not possible for Freemasonry to exist in a country under a Communist government. They further claimed that the majority of the officers of the Grand Lodge of Cuba had become exiled in the United States.

On March 6, 1961, the Grand Lodge in Exile was recognized and granted permission by Edwin Larson, Grand Master of Masons in Florida. On March 15, 1962, the Grand Lodge of Florida proclaimed that they did not recognize any authority of the Freemasons in Cuba, unless those acts were approved by the Grand Master of Masons in Cuba in Exile.

In 1963, Grand Master John T. Rose, Jr. of the Grand Lodge of Florida issued an edict which stated their recognition that Grand Master Tarajano-Gonzalez was the only recognized Grand Master of Masons in Cuba. Between 1963 and 1968, three Lodges of the Grand Lodge of Cuba in Exile were founded in Miami, named Liberty, Equality, and Fraternity.

As of 2010, the Grand Lodge of Cuba in Exile stated that the Communist government of Cuba maintains Freemasonry as a tool and method for control of the population, rather than allowing it to autonomously uphold the ideals of Freemasonry.

=== Other bodies in exile ===
Other Grand Lodges were created for the Cuban exile community, including the United Grand Lodge of the Antilles (Spanish: Gran Logia Unida de las Antillas), and the Most Serene Grand Lodge (Spanish: Serenisima Gran Logia), and the Cuba First Federation of Cuban Masons in Exile (Spanish: Federacion de Masones Cubanos Cuba Primero).

== Republic of Cuba, Post-1959 ==
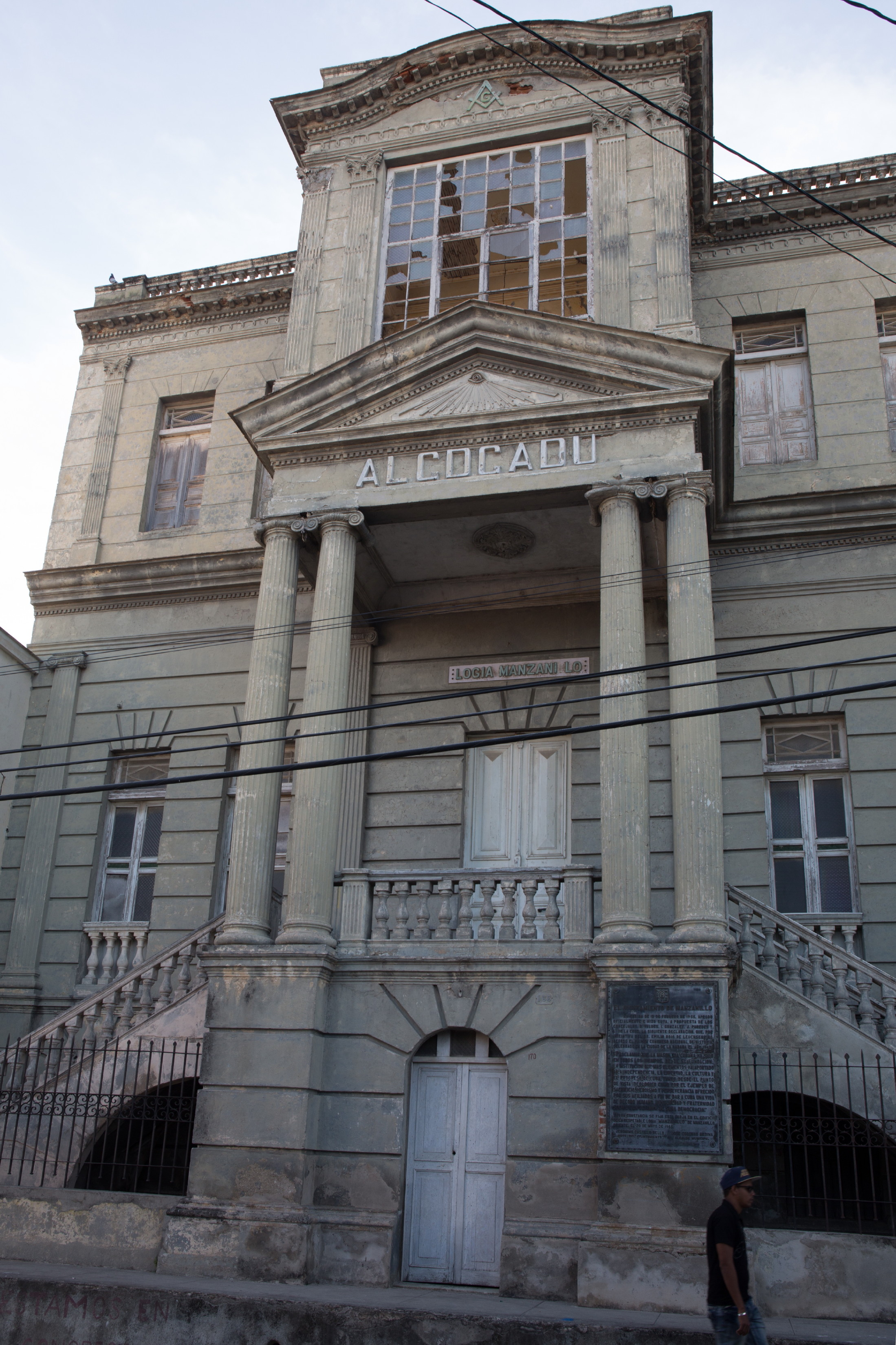
Masonic Lodge in Manzanillo, seen here in 2016

After the war, the Grand Lodge of Cuba was reopened in Havana and was allowed to continue its normal function. It was the only institution of Cuban civil society from before the Revolution that the Castros, Che, and the new Marxist government did not completely dismantle. Some historians argue that Castro only wanted to use it as an extension of the Communist Party of Cuba and a method to control the population, while others argue that he felt a unique bond with Freemasonry where no other institution had impacted the revolutionary history of Cuba so much.

In 1960, after the leadership of the Grand Lodge fled the country, Deputy Grand Master Aurelio Alvarez took over the office as Acting Grand Master for a short time, but Aurelio Alvarez also fled the country not long after. Former Senior Grand Warden Manuel Céspedes Mora took over as Grand Master. Between 1960 and 1965, there was no stability in the leadership of the Grand Lodge, as Grand Masters routinely resigned, fled the country, or were arrested.

At regular meetings of the Grand Lodge of Cuba, there were debates about the possibility of openly criticizing the new government, or if whether to survive, they needed to put their support behind Castro. Grand Master Jorge Luis Cuervo Calvo was arrested by the Cuban government alongside several other members of the Grand Lodge of Cuba for conspiracy against the government, and some Grand Lodge officers actively supported this coup attempt.

Castro placed the Grand Lodge of Cuba legally under the jurisprudence of the Office of Religious Affairs (OAR) (Spanish: Oficina de Asuntos Religiosos) of the Central Committee of the Communist Party of Cuba. OAR, which is responsible for regulating religion in Cuba, has often been labeled as a secret religious police by the Cuban exile community, and other advocates for religious freedom in Cuba. Other departments of the government more readily recognizable as secret police did implant agents into the Masonic Lodges of Cuba as secret informants. After the coup attempt, OAR required the Grand Lodge to regularly submit minutes of Lodge meetings and supply lists of names of those who attended meetings. If the Grand Lodge forgot to provide minutes to OAR, they would be fined.

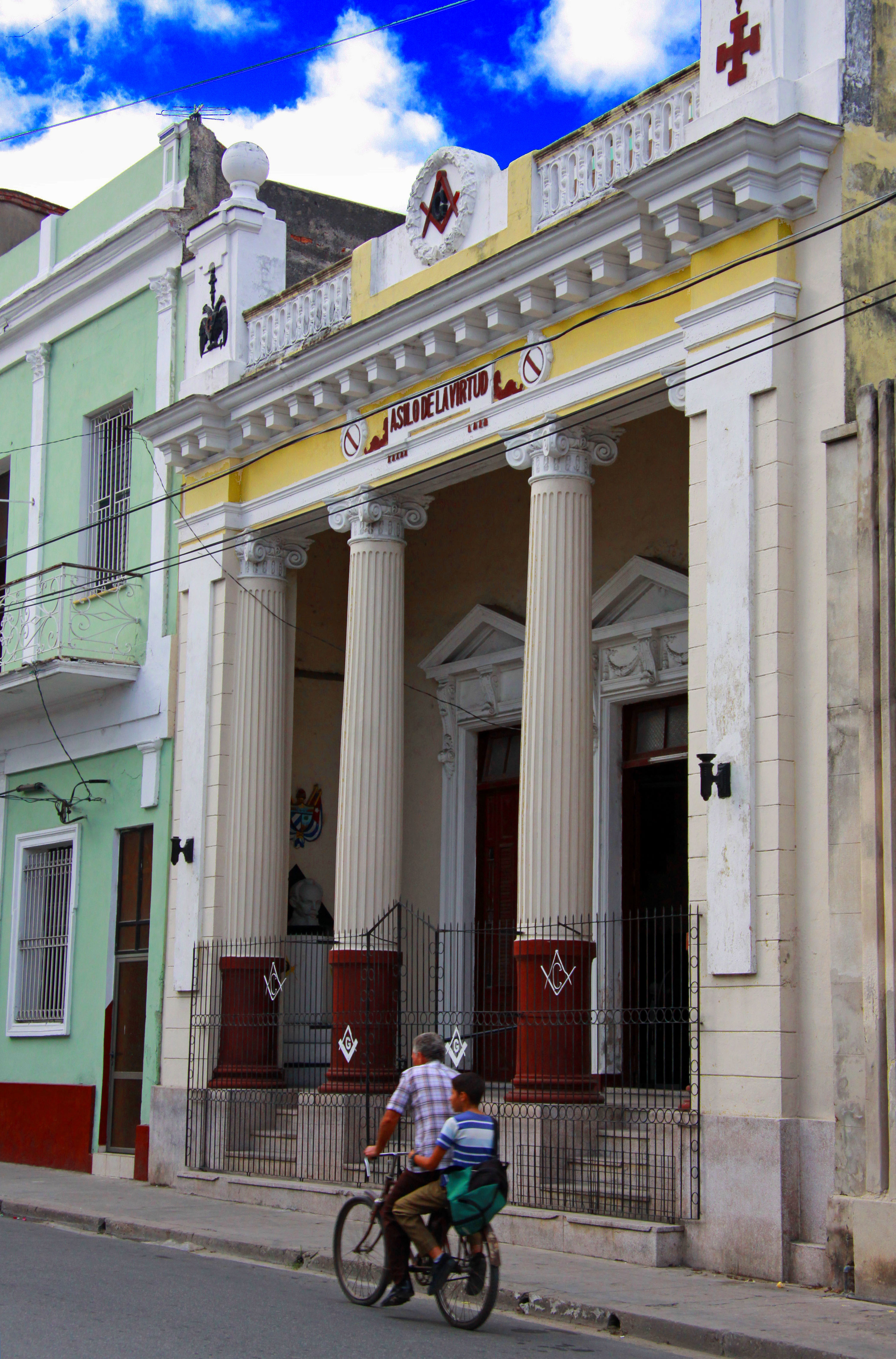
Masonic Lodge in Cienfuegos

In 1965, Francisco Condom was elected Grand Master. Leadership stabilized, but membership fell. From 1959 to 1980, membership in Freemasonry in Cuba declined by 40% in a period of sharp and intense reduction. Where in 1959, there were over 34,000 Freemasons, in 1980, that number had fallen to below 20,000. US narratives attributed this decline to a mistrust that the Communist regime held of Freemasonry, Cuban narratives attributed this to the economic impact that the Revolution had on the upper and middle classes, which had previously been the bulk of Freemasons in Cuba, and the former barriers to entry that existed for those in the working class.

Cuba's most prominent economic trading partners were the Soviet Union and the Eastern Bloc coalition, where Freemasonry had been entirely outlawed since the time of the Bolsheviks. Castro desired to maintain positive relations with Cuba's primary economic benefactors, and to avoid a political scandal, he did not see any use of Freemasonry as a tool in Cuba's foreign policy. Additionally, in those impoverished countries where Cuba desired to spread its brand of Marxism, Freemasonry had long been seen as a gentlemen's club for colonizers. Castro therefore limited international travel for Freemasons.

From 1960 to 1980, due to a negative societal stereotype about the working character of Freemasonry, if Freemasons were discovered, they struggled to maintain positions at university and trade schools, secure employment, or be promoted at work.

On March 28, 1965, Francisco M. Condom Cestino was elected Grand Master, and Jose Alvarez Rivera Maldonado was elected Grand Secretary.

In 1965, the Grand Lodge of Massachusetts took over the dispensation of the Caribbean Naval Lodge, which is the Masonic Naval Lodge at Guantanamo Bay Naval Base.

Into the year 1967, the Masonic Service Association of the United States publication Foreign Grand Lodges Recognized By the Forty-nine Grand Lodges of the United States stated that 38 Grand Lodges in the United States were still in regular "fraternal communication" with the Grand Lodge of Cuba at Havana.

From 1967 to 2007, no new Lodges were created in Cuba.

In 1970, the street in front of the National Temple was officially renamed after Salvador Allende, who was not only a good friend of Fidel Castro, but also a prominent Freemason himself.

=== Collapse of the USSR ===
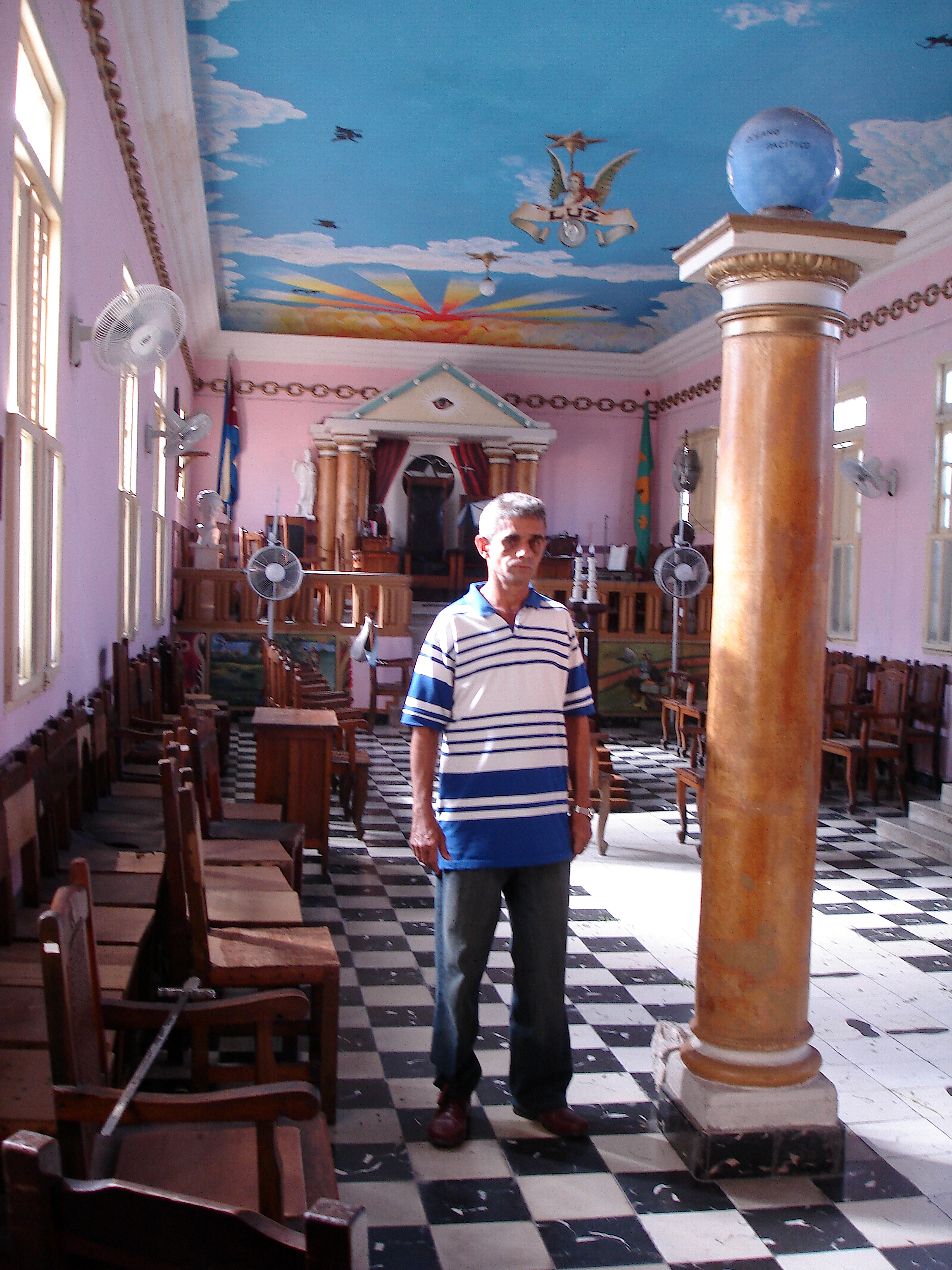
Interior of the Masonic Lodge in Pinar del Río, seen here in 2005

After the Dissolution of the Soviet Union in 1990, Cuba lost access to its primary financial partners, and was facing a massive economic collapse. In order to stave off the effects of economic isolation, they authorized the transformation of formerly state-owned enterprise into a new kind of joint private-public company to develop hotels and rejuvenate Cuba's tourism sector.

The Communist Party of Cuba allowed Cuban civil society organizations to reform, allowing hundreds of non-governmental organizations to form in Havana, and especially relaxed its regulations on membership in Catholic Church. They relaxed regulations on international charities, including Caritas Internationalis. When the World Wide Web was created in 1991, Cuba authorized its citizens access to the internet.

In 1991, the Congress of the Communist Party of Cuba officially authorized registered Communists to join the Freemasons (and churches). Membership in the Grand Lodge of Cuba rose sharply, and Cuba fully opened the country to Freemasonry. Masons were allowed to attend public events adorned in Masonic regalia. New lodges were opened across the country. Freemasons were also allowed to lay wreaths at the graves of deceased Brothers.

After 1991, newly initiated Freemasons included high-ranking leaders of the Communist Party, government officials, members of Cuban dissident movements, antigovernment activists, and others.

In 1993, Caridad del Rosario Diego Bello was appointed head of OAR.

In 1998, at the 5th Conference of the Inter‑American Masonic Confederation (CMI) (Spanish: Confederación Masónica Interamericana), the 95 member bodies of CMI recognized the Grand Lodge of Cuba as "regular and correct," and rejected the regularity claims of the Grand Lodge of Cuba in Exile.

In 2000, the Cuban government pressured the Grand Lodge of Cuba to elect a man named José Manuel Collera Venta as Grand Master. In 2005, when the Grand Lodge of Cuba attempted to expel Venta from Freemasonry "for an undisclosed reason," the Cuban government again intervened and stopped that from happening.

By May 8, 2000, two factions existed within Cuban Freemasonry. One faction based in the National Temple headquarters preferred not to display any dissent against the government for the fear that their Lodges would be shuttered, but another faction within the leadership of the local Lodges advocated that Freemasons should be faithful to their statues, maintaining an impartial political position, no matter the consequences that might befall them. Lodges further away from Havana had more freedom due to less infiltration by government agents.

In 2002, the Grand Lodge of Cuba reestablished its relationship with the Grand Lodge of Italy and the Grand Orient of Italy.

By the year 2008, there were 29,110 Freemasons in Cuba, compared to 1980, when there were only 19,690.

== Cuban Freemasonry scandals (2004–present) ==
=== Alan Gross and Cuban Freemasonry (2000–2014) ===
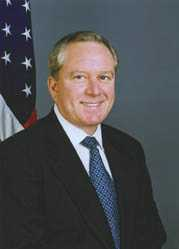
Otto Reich was the Assistant Secretary of State for Western Hemisphere Affairs during the Bush Administration. Reich was born in Cuba.

In 2001, Otto Reich, a hardline Republican Anti-Castro Cuban-born exile in the United States, who had formerly been involved in the Iran–Contra affair, was at the time the Assistant Secretary of State for Western Hemisphere Affairs. He approached Marc Wachtenheim from the Pan American Development Foundation, a subcontractor for the United States Agency for International Development (USAID), to hatch a development program to reopen Cuba, and then developed a covert influence campaign that might lead to conditions that could foment revolution there. They decided that because Freemasonry had been so present in Cuban society, to cultivate the Grand Lodge of Cuba.

In 2001, Marc Wachtenheim brought Grand Master Collera Venta to Washington, D.C. to meet with Otto Reich.

The staff of the United States Interests Section in Havana were well aware of the fact that Grand Master Collera Venta was a Cuban counterintelligence officer at the State Security Unit (DSE) (Spanish: Departamento de Seguridad del Estado) who went by the codename Agente Gerardo, and had been a spy for over 25 years. They did not share this information with USAID, nor any of their subcontractors, because the subcontractors didn't share their own plans with the Interests Section. The greater staff of the US diplomatic mission in Havana were aware of Collera Venta's true employment by 2007 – but they still did not inform USAID.

Collera Venta later told CNN: "My job was to discover and neutralize these plans against my country."

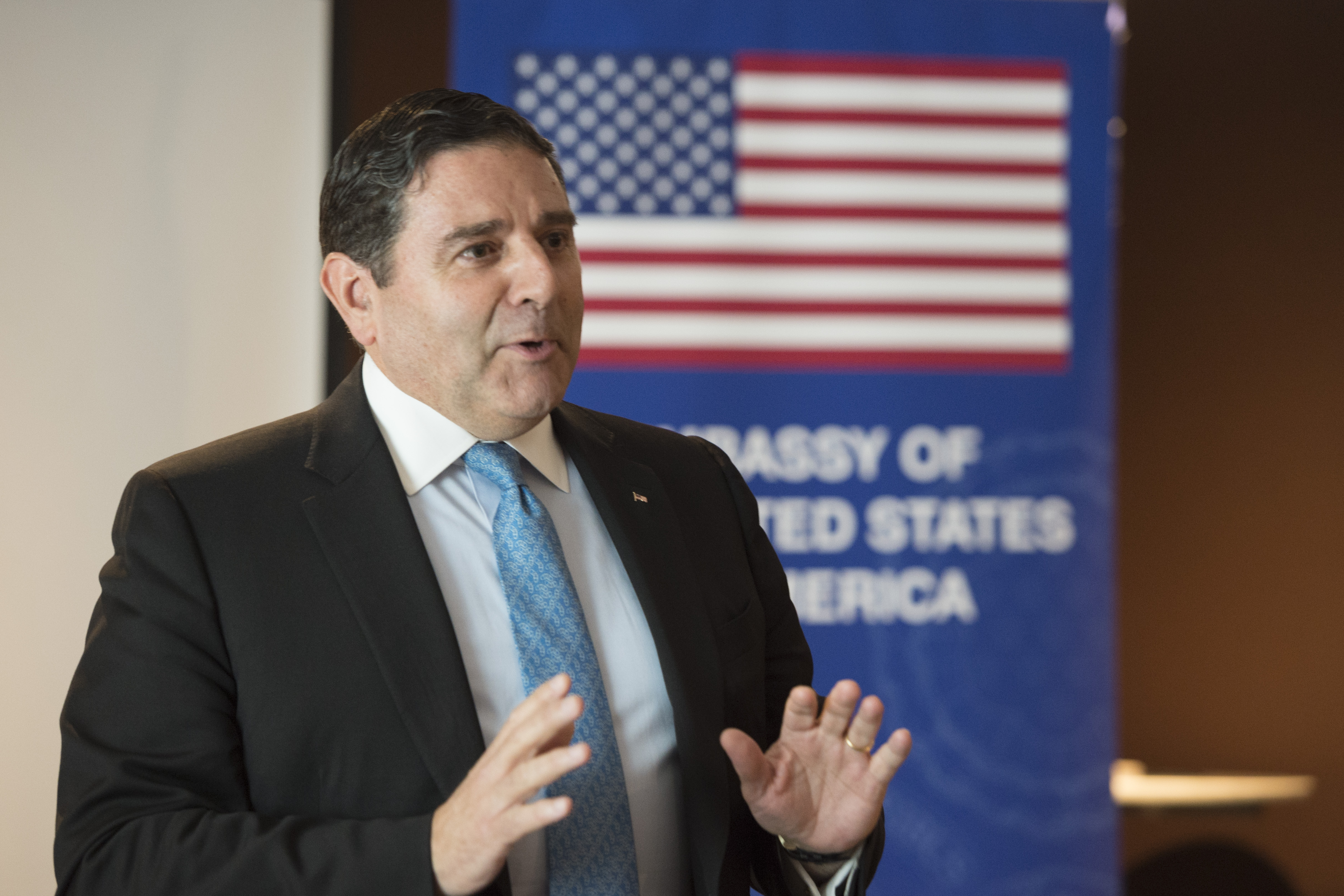
Akram Elias, seen here in 2018, is the former Grand Master of the Grand Lodge of Washington.

Akram Elias is a businessman from Lebanon living in Washington, D.C., who was the founder and CEO of a private consulting firm in the city called Capital Communications Group. Elias was initiated as a Freemason in 1996, and by 2008 was the Most Worshipful Brother (former Master) of Potomac Lodge No. 5, but had also been raised into stature within the Grand Lodge of Masonic Education and the Grand Lodge of Washington, D. C. The first time he toured Cuba was in 2001, and he made several trips over the years. On one of those trips, in 2004, he personally met Grand Master Collera Venta to discuss Freemasonry in America (e.g., the Americas), and the future of Cuban Freemasonry.

In 2004, Alan Gross, a Maryland man from DAI Global, a subcontracting company for USAID, carried a package of electronics equipment and money to Cuba for Marc Wachtenheim. Gross didn't know any Spanish, and was not an expert on Cuba. Gross delivered this package to Grand Master Collera Venta. Gross made five trips to the island between 2004 and 2009, smuggling communications equipment to Collera Venta every time. Certain items that Alan Gross carried into Cuba were BGAN satellite internet links into Jewish communities to circumvent the Cuban firewall. Gross also reached out to Jewish American humanitarian organizations like the Jewish Federations of North America and their chapter in Broward County, Florida, to smuggle contraband items into Jewish communities in Cuba to allow them to communicate to the outside world. Another item he carried was a mobile SIM card that the Associated Press revealed was used by the Pentagon and CIA to create phantom cell signals.

On December 2, 2009, Akram Elias traveled to the Hotel Nacional de Cuba in Havana to meet with Alan Gross. Gross was arrested the next night, on December 3, 2009, sentenced to 15 years in prison for subversion.

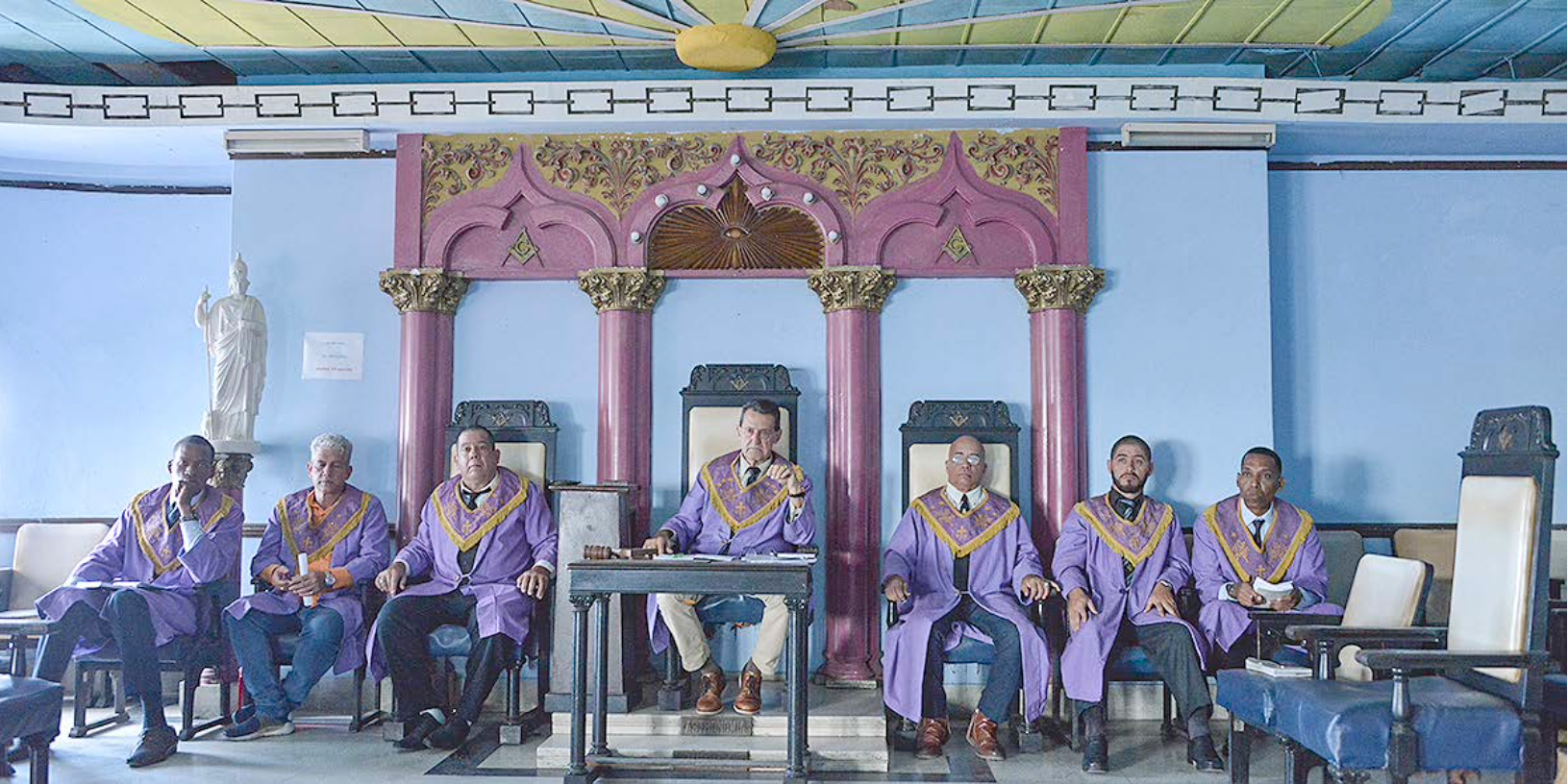
The Supreme Court of Masonic Justice is a body of magistrates that decides Masonic Law in Cuba. It was created around 1936.

Gross and his lawyers maintained that if he had been carrying clandestine intelligence materials into the country, that he was doing it unknowingly.

In 2010, the Grand Lodge of Cuba publicly accused former Grand Master Collera Venta and two other Cuban Freemasons of corruption and dereliction of duty. They accused these men of allowing a foreigner, a Freemason from Miami, to attend a meeting at a Temple in Cuba in 2009. They alleged that this violated a rule that only allowed Cuban Freemasons into the Temple. The Supreme Court of Masonic Justice set a trial date for June 2010, and sent out "Masonic investigators" of the Court to determine the facts of the case. Collera Venta wrote a letter in April 2010 in which he said that the accusations were false, and insisted that Cuban exiles were to blame.

In mid-2010, the Obama administration issued sanctions against the Government of Syria relating to charges of state-sponsored terrorism and weapons of mass destruction development. In November, Akram Elias flew to Damascus. He met with Bouthaina Shaaban, an aide to Bashar al-Assad, to assist the Syrian regime in developing a public relations strategy to repair Syria's damaged image in Washington. He was paid $22,000 a month for his services. At around the same time that Elias was working for the Syrians, Capital Communications Group maintained contracts with USAID, the Department of Justice, Department of State, Drug Enforcement Administration, and Department of Homeland Security, among other federal agencies.

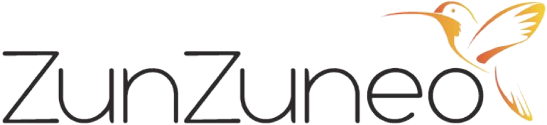
ZunZuneo was a covert influence campaign started by hardline Republicans at the United States Agency for International Development designed to foment revolution in Cuba.

In 2010, USAID launched ZunZuneo, a social media network designed for Cuba. The intent of the right-wing USAID officials who hatched the scheme, according to documents uncovered by the Associated Press, was to create "smart mobs," that would overthrow the government of Cuba.

The United States diplomatic cables leak occurred on Wikileaks around this time, and Collera Venta's cover was blown. Without being able to work in intelligence anymore, he left the State Security Unit to focus full time on his career as a cardiologist.

At Alan Gross's espionage trial in 2011, the Cuban government prosecutors alleged that Alan Gross was running a secret program for USAID called the "Cuba democracy program." The prosecution said that Gross had been coordinating with Akram Elias about this project, and at their meeting in December 2009, they discussed extending USAID's development program into Freemasonry in Cuba. The prosecution also presented evidence at the trial of two flash drives that contained material relating to projects "against the Cuban state." In 2004, they alleged that Alan Gross smuggled a video camera to Grand Master José Manuel Collera Vento, which originated from the office of Marc Wachtenheim. That office, they pointed out, was a block away from the White House.

In 2011, Grand Master Collera Venta went on a series of Cuban television broadcasts called Las Razones de Cuba, in which he publicly admitted that he had been working for the Cuban government as a counterintelligence officer his entire life, and that he had only been planted as Grand Master so that the Cuban government could monitor Freemasons. On April 1, 2011, the Cuban government awarded José Manuel Collera Vento with the Escudo Pinareño (English: Shield of Pinar del Rio), the highest award of the Provincial Assembly of People's Power in Pinar del Río. This was awarded for his services to the state. Exiled Cuban Freemasons called this a betrayal of the institution of Freemasonry itself.

=== Cuban Thaw and attempts to repair relationship ===
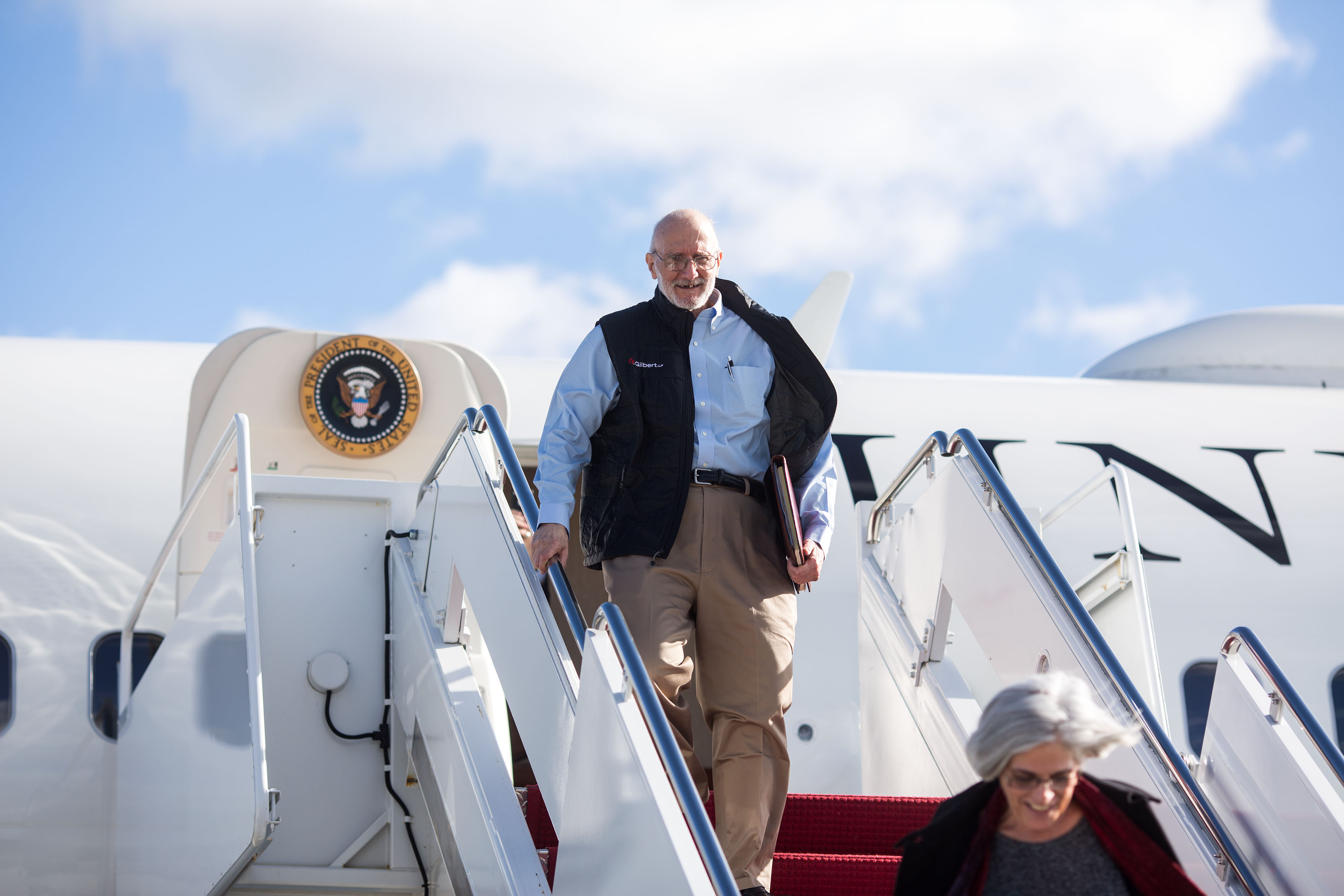
In December 2014, Alan Gross was exchanged in a prisoner swap for three Cubans convicted of espionage in the United States.

In 2011, Lazaro Cuesta Valdes was elected as the Grand Commander of the Supreme Council of Cuba. After his election, the Supreme Council created a Facebook page, launched an updated webpage, and launched the first International Conference on Freemasonry and Integration to Current Society.

Between 2012 and 2014, Grand Commander Cuesta Valdes travelled around the world, first to Rome, and then to visit the Supreme Councils of the United States' Southern Jurisdiction and Northern Jurisdiction, in Ohio and Washington, D.C. Informally, he also met with leaders of the Cuban exile Freemasonry community in Miami to strengthen relations with the United States.

In October 2013, the Supreme Council of Cuba held an open meeting and invited Cuban Masons living anywhere to Havana to discuss the fractured state of Cuban Freemasonry. Grand Master Gutierrez Torres attended and drafted Official Message No. 6 after discussions with members of the diaspora.

In April 2014, while still in prison, Alan Gross launched a hunger strike to protest his treatment by both Cuba and the United States.

When the Associated Press leaked the ZunZuneo program documents to the public, Senator Patrick Leahy called it: "Dumb, dumb, dumb." Leahy then led the Senate committee review of the debacle.

On December 17, 2014, Alan Gross was released from Cuban prison in exchange for three members of the Cuban Five, who had been detained in the United States and charged with espionage.

On December 10, 2016, the Lazaro F. Cuesta Valdes from the Grand Lodge of Cuba travelled to Miami to meet with representatives of the Grand Lodge of Florida, where the Grand Lodge of Cuba gained re-recognition, after 56 years, as "regular and correct" by Florida.

In 2018, Ernesto Zamora Fernández was elected as Grand Master of the Grand Lodge of Cuba.

=== Fallout from the 2021 Cuban protests ===
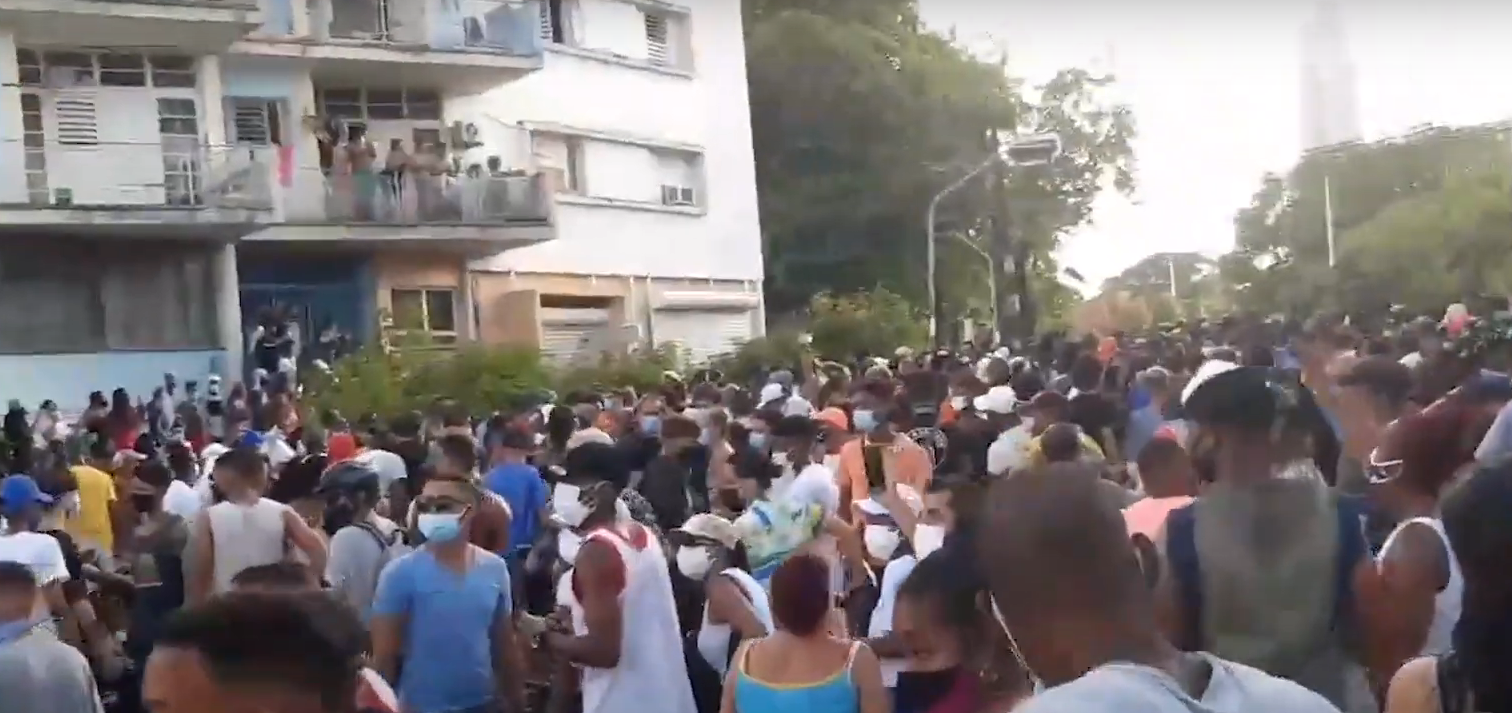
Image captured from the 2021 Cuban protests.

On July 11, 2021, the 2021 Cuban protests began with thousands of Cubans marching in the street as the single largest anti-government protest in Cuba since 1994.

On July 14, Grand Master Zamora Fernández and Grand Secretary Carlos A. Pírez Benítez also addressed a letter to the whole of the Cuban people, the government, and all Cuban Freemasons. In this letter, they wrote that dialogue and tolerance were the most important ways to resolve any difference between parties that disagreed with each other. They desired human rights to be universally applied as codified in the Universal Declaration of Human Rights. They said that the events of the protests were foreseeable and entirely preventable; that it was not unordinary for a government to try and contain a protest, but that the Grand Lodge were disheartened by what they viewed as an excessive use of force and violence used by the government against the protestors. They stressed to the government that errors in governing a nation should never be approached with complacency. They wrote that July 14 was a special day of solemn remembrance in the history of Cuban Freemasonry, as it was that day, many years earlier, when the Grand Lodge of Cuba returned to their use of the motto of Liberty, Equality, and Fraternity. They wrote that all people are equal before the law, and that the Grand Lodge of Cuba stood alongside the people of Cuba, and advocated for peace, harmony and justice. They ended their letter with the words: "We urge that tolerance, the search for truth, and brotherly love be the currency that prevail in any of the circumstances."

On July 16, 2021, the Grand Commander of the Supreme Council of Cuba at the time, José Ramón Viñas Alonso, wrote another letter to President Miguel Díaz-Canel. This one was much more direct than the Grand Master's letter, and outright rejected the authority of the President of Cuba. In the letter, he admonished the President's choices and actions during the event, and condemned what he called government repression of the protest. He wrote that in the Supreme Council's considered opinion, President Díaz-Canel had intentionally and purposefully sent armed government police to use violence against the Cuban people, to arrest peaceful demonstrators, and to curtail the voice of anyone who "...thinks contrary to the system that you represent..." Even more critically, Viñas Alonso accused the President of using the United States embargo against Cuba as an excuse for any lack of ability that the Cuban government possessed in the day-to-day governing of the country, and that in doing so, the President avoided truly addressing the ineffectiveness of the government.

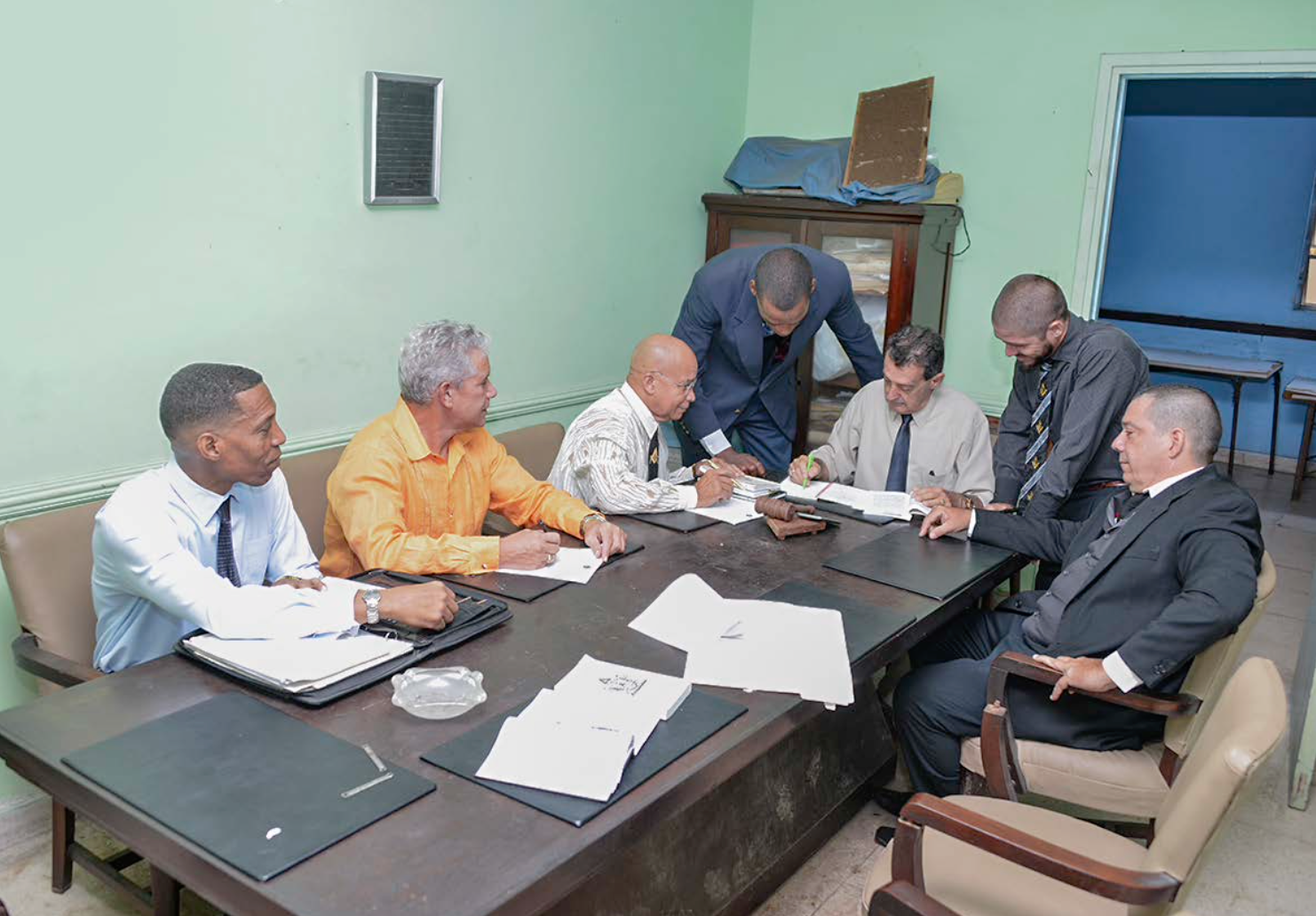
The Supreme Court of Masonic Justice, seen here deliberating over a trial at the National Temple in September 2022.

Later in the afternoon of July 16, Grand Commander Viñas Alonso was summoned to Castro Police Station at the corner of Calle Unidad (English: Unidad Street) and Calle C (English: C Street) in Plaza de la Revolución. At the police station, Viñas Alonso was interrogated by three federal agents of the State Security Unit.

In August 2021, Grand Master Ernesto Zamora Fernández was invited to attend a private meeting with Díaz-Canel, but Grand Commander Viñas Alonso was not invited. The Grand Lodge, being only responsible for the first three degrees, does not represent all of Cuban Freemasonry without the Supreme Council, which is responsible for all the higher degrees, from the 4th to the 33rd degrees. Cuban Freemasons considered this as an insult to the Supreme Council, and an attempt to reject the Grand Commander's authority.

Cuban Freemasons sent a flood of calls, emails, and letters to the office of Grand Master Zamora Fernández to refuse to meet with the President. On August 23, Zamora Fernández wrote a letter distributed to Cuban Freemasons indicating that the office of the Grand Master had decided not to attend the meeting "...in order to preserve Masonic unity".

The Freemason and Cuban activist writer Ángel Santiesteban Prats stated that President Díaz-Canel's full intention was to completely fracture Freemasonry in Cuba. Santiesteban said: "I doth my hat to the Grand Master's wise decision. Masonic unity above all. History is being made... it is a milestone in our country's history, especially over the last 62 years. I remind you that Freemasonry is the only institution in Cuba that didn't dance like puppets on the stage with Fidel Castro and demand the return of that boy Elián. Everybody else gave in. The Abakuás, the spiritists, and the Yoruba Association, they all caved to Castro."

On March 28, 2022, Grand Treasurer Francisco Javier Alfonso Vidal was elected as Grand Master of the Grand Lodge of Cuba.

In May 2022, Grand Commander Viñas Alonso was prevented by the State Security Unit from traveling on official business to the United States to attend several Freemasonic and Masonic events, including the Summit of the Americas in Los Angeles. The State Security Unit continued their campaign to remove Viñas Alonso from power, and began communicating with the Supreme Court of Masonic Justice to launch an investigation into his "misconduct," and to strip him of his Masonic rights.

On May 20, 2022, the Grand Lodge of Cuba hosted a centenary celebration of the 1902 Proclamation of the Republic of Cuba. In September, 2022, the High Chamber of the Supreme Court of Masonic Justice approved a letter to be delivered to President Díaz-Canel officially requesting that May 20 be observed as a national holiday, despite Díaz-Canel's past public rejection of the May 20th movement.

Sometime later in 2022, Alfonso Vidal was approached by members of the State Security Unit to give evidence against Viñas Alonso, and to participate in the official expulsion of the Grand Commander from Freemasonry. State Security Unit agents took him to an office in Havana and attempted to cultivate him as an agent of the state. One agent in particular, who went by the codename Agente Poll, told him that his office had been assigned to monitor Freemasonry in Cuba for over 40 years, and had agents placed in Lodges all over Cuba.

On August 10, 2022, Brian José Infante Machín, President of the Masonic Union for the Freedom of Cuba, published a Facebook post on the account of the Ibero-American-European Alliance against Communism, calling for a national strike on Fidel Castro's birthday, August 13. He told Freemasons that they should march in the streets in solidarity with those young people who had been mistreated by the government during the July 11th Protests.

In September 2022, according to the 2022 edition of La Gran Logia (the magazine of the Grand Lodge of Cuba), the Supreme Court of Masonic Justice either expelled or ratified the expulsion of seven Freemasons from the fraternity in Cuba; Pavel Guillén Guzmán from Dos Ríos Lodge in Palma Soriano, Pedro Demesio Martínez González from Astrea Lodge in Centro Habana, Luis Alberto Reyes Expósito from Asilo de la Virtud Lodge in Cienfuegos, Brian José Infante Machín from Luz Caballero Lodge No. 81 in Marianao, Lester Damián Cañizares from Luz Caballero Lodge No. 81, and Manuel Arístides Suárez Álvarez from Victor Hugo Lodge in Matanzas.

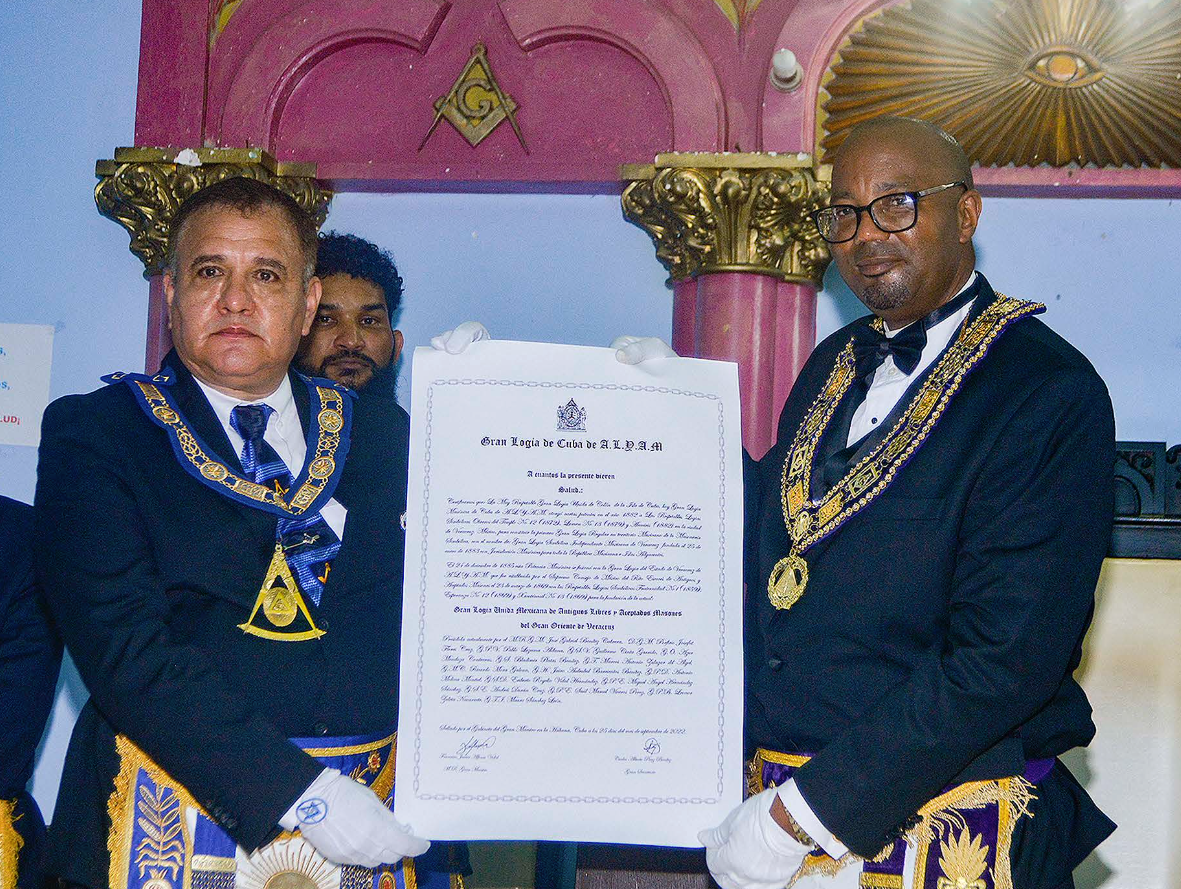
Francisco Javier Alfonso Vidal (right), seen here presenting a certificate to Veracruz Grand Master José Gabriel Benítez Cabrera (left) on September 25, 2022.

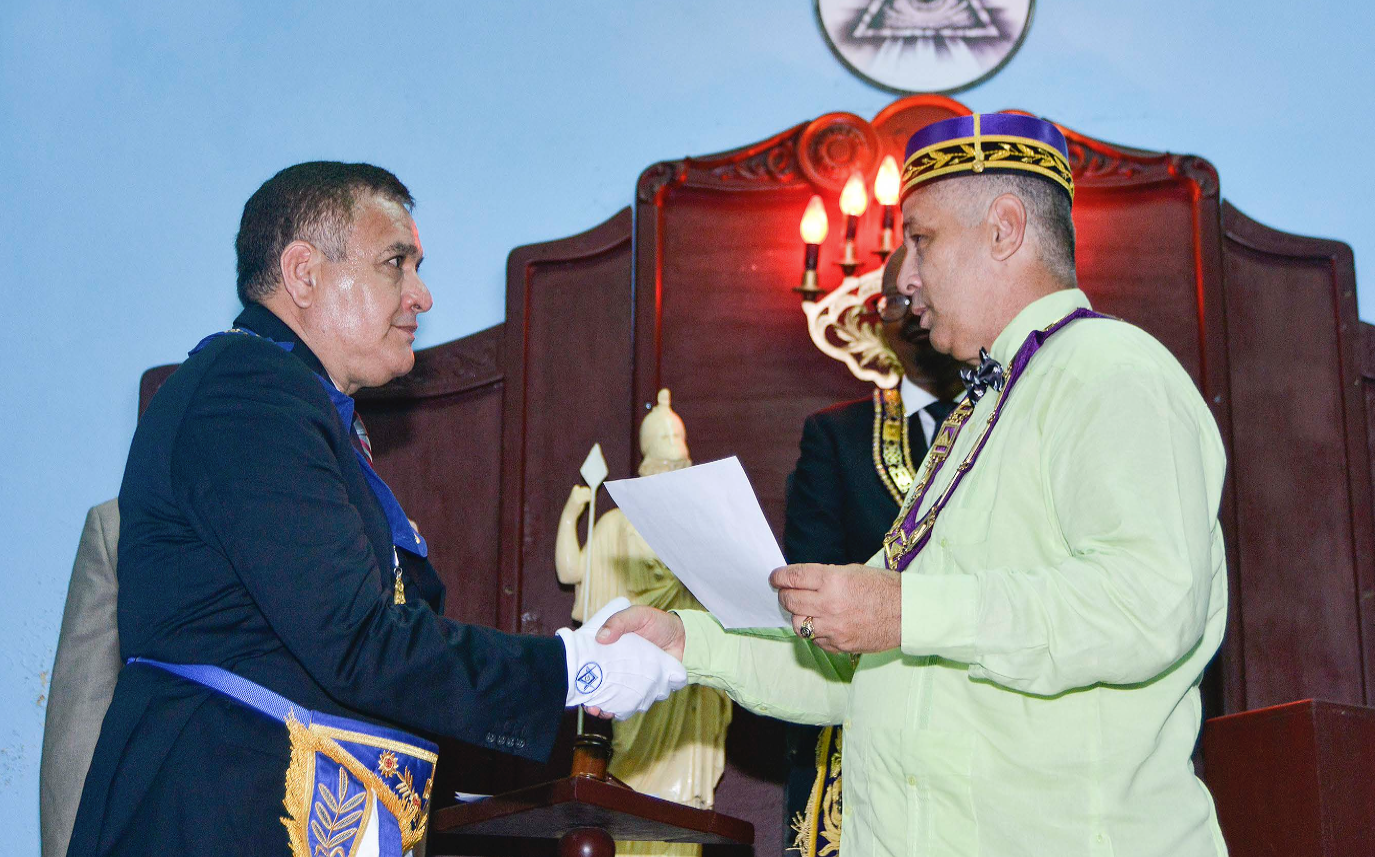
José Ramón Viñas Alonso (right) seen here presenting a certificate to Benítez Cabrera (left) on September 25, 2022.

On the weekend of September 23–25, 2022, a delegation of the Grand Lodge of Veracruz, from Veracruz, Veracruz, traveled to Havana, where the Grand Lodge of Cuba recognized that body as "regular and correct" in a ceremony at the National Temple. Grand Master Alfonso Vidal, with the Grand Commander of the Supreme Council of Cuba, José Ramón Viñas Alonso, presented certificates of friendship and recognition to the Mexican delegation.

In what was called an act of fraternal friendship, the Grand Lodge of Veracruz invited the Grand Master Alfonso Vidal to tour their Grand Lodge in Mexico and participate in a Masonic ceremony there.

On December 5, 2022, the National Temple hosted the 163rd anniversary celebration of the founding of the Grand Lodge of Colon in 1859. Grand Orator Luis Steve Ocaña guided the congregation through the history of Cuban Freemasonry since the 19th century, and told the congregation of hundreds of Freemasons in his liturgy that: "Today, the fight for the homeland is with the most important weapon that Freemasons carry, which is the most lofty thought with which we must act to stop seeing everywhere the lament of the loss of values in society.... I believe that we masons should talk about politics, since it is the fundamental rule that governs society, we must talk and, in addition, look for a way to do politics."

Days later, Alfonso Vidal was interrogated again by Agent Poll from the State Security Unit. This interrogation lasted for twelve hours. Agent Poll accused Grand Commander Viñas Alonso of accepting bribes from the Universal Peace Federation, which the State Security Unit jokingly refers to as the "Moon Sect," and insinuated that he believed Alfonso Vidal might have been involved. Agent Poll also asked Alfonso Vidal to suspend Grand Orator Luis Steve Ocaña. Alfonso Vidal later said: "He tried to blackmail me, saying that legally they could close the institution, and finally, he told me that they weren't going to let me travel to Mexico."

=== Resignation and asylum of Grand Master Alfonso Vidal ===
On December 15, Alfonso Vidal signed a copy of Masonic Decree 634 and handed over temporary administration of the Grand Lodge to Acting Grand Master to Armando Guerra Lozano, the Grand Master of Ceremonies, and travelled to Mexico with his wife.

Alfonso Vidal did participate in the ceremony, but afterwards, the Grand Lodge of Cuba lost communication with him. He was scheduled to return to Havana on December 21, but when he did not return, the Grand Lodge declared that this indicated a "tacit resignation of his duties." They iterated that they had no knowledge of his whereabouts, and were concerned what fate might have befallen him in Mexico.

In late December 2022 or early January 2023, Alfonso Vidal and his wife crossed the Mexico–United States border into Texas, where they officially requested Asylum in the United States. The Grand Lodge of Florida provided them financial assistance, and a Masonic Lodge in Brownsville, Texas helped them find temporary lodgings.

On January 3, 2023, Alfonso Vidal revealed that he was still alive and publicly tendered his resignation from the office. In his public letter of resignation, he cited his reasons as being the lack of "the possibility of fulfilling, with the necessary total transparency, autonomy, and freedom, what Cuban Masonic legislation defines as required to carry out this responsibility."

Alfonso Vidal said that the Grand Lodge was in the practice of "distorting Masonic Law." He also noted that because he had signed Decree 634, it was virtually impossible for him to have abandoned his post. He wrote that he was aware that he had been wrongfully terminated through an Extraordinary Session of the Supreme Court of Masonic Justice, and that those who signed his tacit resignation were being ordered to do so by the State Security Unit. He lamented the nature of the "...political gangsterism that works in the Grand Lodge of Cuba."

Alfonso Vidal wrote that: "Cuban Masons have the right to know that our institution is under one of the greatest attacks it has received since January 1, 1959." He called back on the events surrounding the case of Grand Commander Viñas Alonso, and the letter that Viñas Alonso had sent to President Díaz-Canel. He said that the situation since Díaz-Canel had sent the State Security Unit after Viñas Alonso, the situation in Cuban Freemasonry had become increasingly difficult to operate within as an ethical and moral Grand Master. He could not fulfill his obligations as Grand Master for the fear of what actions the Cuban state might take against him. He also urged Cuban Freemasons to reject anyone from the Cuban intelligence community to ever again gain high office in the Grand Lodge. He wrote that: "They want to control our brotherhood... It is up to authentic Cuban Freemasons to prevent any of this from happening; once aware of the ever-growing influence State Security seeks to exert over our institution, we must not allow anyone likely linked to these agencies to assume the position."

After arriving in the United States, Alfonso Vidal told reporters that former Grand Master Zamora Fernández, despite publicly appearing to stand against the injustice of the Cuban government, had privately apologized to the Communist Party. Alfonso Vidal said that at a special session of the Cuban Supreme Court of Masonic Justice, Zamora Fernández accused Master Mason Brian José Infante Machín from Logia Luz Caballero (English: Luz Caballero Lodge) of leading a conspiracy against the government, after which the Supreme Court expelled Infante Machín.

Alfonso Vidal said that: "Zamora Fernández is weak-willed; his desire for recognition makes him vulnerable to State Security. I caught him crying the day he had to leave his post, and even now he hasn't come to terms with the fact that he's no longer the Grand Master. State Security takes advantage of all this; they seem to study your profile. They repeatedly emphasized that I was a noble and humble person, and that's how they approached me. Furthermore, officials from the Office of Religious Affairs speak very highly of him; in fact, they were confident that I would follow in Zamora's footsteps."

He also called on the Freemasons of Cuba to elect Viñas Alonso as the Grand Master of Cuba.

Alfonso Vidal also said that at his final meeting with Agent Poll, Poll told him that he could manipulate the public into believing anything, and even convince the country that Alfonso Vidal was a thief, as "...money can go missing anytime." Alfonso Vidal also stated that he firmly believed that Grand Treasurer Airán Cervera was either in the employment of the Ministry of the Interior or the National Revolutionary Police Force. He said that Grand Treasurer Airán Cervera could not be trusted.

=== Masonic retirement home financial scandal ===
==== Llansó National Masonic Asylum ====
In 2023, rumors started circulating on social media that the Hogar Nacional Masónico Llansó (English: Llansó National Masonic Retirement Home), a retirement home specifically for elderly Cuban Freemasons, had 21,000 dollars of cash (unspecified "freely convertible" currency) in their treasury. After these social media posts started circulating, the Board of Trustees worried they might be robbed, because Llansó is located in a "rough part of town," in Arroyo Naranjo near La Güinera neighborhood of Havana.

Grand Master Mario Urquía Carreño, who also served as the Co-President of the Board of Trustees for Llansó, volunteered that his own office safe could store the money. 19,000 of the cash was then transferred to the vaults of the Grand Lodge of Cuba at the National Masonic Temple, the rest of this money the retirement home kept for expenses and emergencies. The money transfer was signed by three Worshipful Brothers present for the transaction. The Grand Master's office was on the eleventh floor, the top floor, of the National Masonic Temple.

At a Board of Trustees meeting in October 2023, Ángel Santiesteban Prats, representing the office of Grand Commander Viñas Alonso, requested a monthly count of the money be performed by Grand Treasurer Airán Cervera. Grand Master Urquía Carreño informed Santiesteban Prats that the money was in the vault of his own office, not in the possession of the Grand Treasurer. After Santiesteban Prats informed Viñas Alonso about the conversation, the Grand Master and the Grand Commander disagreed on where the money should be kept, but it did stay in the Grand Master's office.

According to a report by Urquía Carreño, on January 5, 2024, at the offices of the National Masonic Temple, Grand Treasurer Airán Cervera pulled Urquía Carreño aside, and asked him if they could discuss something in private. They went up to the roof, where Airán Cervera told Urquía Carreño that the safe was gone, probably stolen. Urquía Carreño, according to his report, kept this information to himself.

At 10:15am on January 9, 2024, the Director of Llansó called Grand Commander Viñas Alonso to inform him that they were in the midst of a food shortage. The two men decided to withdraw 1,000 dollars from the vaults of the Grand Lodge to buy food for the residents. At around noon, Viñas Alonso called Urquía Carreño to inform him that Viñas Alonso would be joined by the Treasurer of the Board of Trustees, Ernesto Valdés García, the Secretary of the Board of Trustees, Frank E. Quevedo Martín, and the Director of the retirement home, Raúl Acosta to come to the vault and withdraw 1,000 dollars.

After being informed of the situation, Grand Master Urquía Carreño said that the elevator in his office was broken, and that Urquía Carreño would bring the money to the offices of the Supreme Council. Grand Commander Viñas Alonso refused, citing the rules. Urquía Carreño said that he understood, and would call later to tell Viñas Alonso what time they could come by the office.

At 7pm on January 9, Urquía Carreño called Viñas Alonso and asked if they could meet in private. Urquía Carreño brought Airán Cervera with him, and they met in Viñas Alonso's home. Urquía Carreño and Airán Cervera then informed him about the missing safe. Viñas Alonso said: "This is a very serious situation.... Did you call the police?" Urquía Carreño replied that he had not, to avoid damaging Freemasonry's image. Viñas Alonso asked why Urquía Carreño waited four days to inform him that the safe was missing, but Airán Cervera assured him that they could have the money replaced by March.

"We talk all the time. You should have told me. You should have gone to the police... Just leave. I need time to think. This is all very serious." Viñas Alonso said. Urquía Carreño and Airán Cervera left.

At 9pm on January 9, Viñas Alonso deliberated scheduling an urgent meeting of the Board of Trustees for the next day. He called Urquía Carreño to discuss this option. "Don't do that, it won't benefit anyone," Urquía Carreño said. Viñas Alonso then insisted the meeting would take place at 4pm.

At the emergency meeting of the Board of Trustees on January 9, the Board of Trustees was made aware of the situation, and Viñas Alonso made a motion for a vote on two proposals. The first was to go immediately to the National Revolutionary Police and file a police report. The second proposal was to draft a report that would be sent out to all Cuban Freemasons detailing the events which took place. Urquía Carreño amended the vote to add a third proposal, to allow him some time to replace the money, and not say anything.

Voting on the order of most to least destructive, the Board voted unanimously to reject on Urquía Carreño's proposal. They then voted unanimously to proceed with the first two proposals. Urquía Carreño said that he was committed to repaying the money. The Board told him not to leave the country, and to cancel his upcoming trips. The Board then spent a long time in deliberation about why Urquía Carreño had waited four days to inform Viñas Alonso about the missing money.

The police report was filed at the Zanja y Dragones Police Station.

==== Cubans call for Urquía Carreño to resign ====
On January 12, 2024, after the document was sent out by the Board to the larger community of Cuban Freemasons, a group of 18 Lodge Masters from all over Cuba demanded the immediate resignation of Urquía Carreño. When the robbery was made public, Llansó received large donations of food from other Freemasons and the Daughters of Acacia.

Urquía Carreño refused to step down, and asked the Freemasons of Cuba to remain patient while the investigation was underway. Instead of stepping down, Urquía Carreño sent all 18 of those Lodge Masters to be sent in front of the Supreme Court of Masonic Justice for trials and investigations, and also ordered Viñas Alonso to be tried by the Supreme Court.

==== Urquía Carreño expelled from the Supreme Council ====
On January 25, 2024, the High Chamber of the Scottish Rite voted unanimously to sanction Urquía Carreño, determining that the actions of the Grand Master were "punishable and intentional, producing a large-scale Masonic schism in the national territory, which endangers the proper functioning of the Supreme Council and the Treaty of Friendship and Mutual Recognition."

Shortly afterward, the Supreme Council issued Decree 009/2024, in which they declared that Urquía Carreño was henceforth expulsed from the Scottish Rite, writing that his actions were: "a clear sign of betrayal by failing to take the oath and loyalty to the fundamental principles of this Supreme Council." In this decree, Viñas Alonso iterated that Mario Urquía never wanted to inform anyone about the scandal, but that he refused to take part in Mario Urquía's attempted coverup. This document was signed by José Ramón Viñas Alonso.

The Supreme Council levied the charge that Urquía Carreño had consistently lied about the facts of the case, and had attempted to manipulate the narrative in a public manner, writing that Urquía Carreño: "has established a field and visceral attack against the Supreme Council to which he himself belongs... in his eagerness to weaken it, has cut off all possibility of understanding between the two Masonic Bodies existing and recognized in the Republic of Cuba." They also stated that since the signing of the Treaty of Friendship and Mutual Recognition in 1876, whenever a sanction was issued by the Supreme Council, that the Grand Lodge would show solidarity in issuing the same sanction. If Urquía Carreño did not step down, it would not only be a violation of Masonic Law, but also break almost a century and a half of tradition. If the Treaty of Friendship broke down, they said, it would only be an invitation for the State Security Unit to further infiltrate the brotherhood.

Urquía Carreño still refused to step down. After this, certain Lodge Masters sent letters to the United States government, requesting that if Urquía Carreño tried to claim asylum there, to deny him this right for his alleged involvement and collaboration with the State Security Unit.

==== Viñas Alonso expelled from the Grand Lodge ====
On February 19, the Second Chamber of the Supreme Court of Masonic Justice heard the case of Viñas Alonso that had been referred to them by Grand Master Urquía Carreño. The President of the Second Chamber, Zamir Brindisi Limonta, called a mistrial because he had not heard enough evidence to fairly decide the facts. The case was dismissed and ratified by the other members of the Court.

Within 24 hours, Urquía Carreño approached the President of the First Chamber of the Supreme Court of Masonic Justice, Ernesto Valdés García (also the Secretary of the Board of Trustees at Llansó at the time of the theft) and demanded that the Supreme Court carry out a new trial. Outside of Freemasonry, Valdés García worked for Urquía Carreño's construction company (Spanish: mipyme), SME Edifica, SURL. The letters S-U-R-L, in this instance, are a Cuban business classifier which stands for Sociedad Unipersonal de Responsabilidad Limitada (English: Single-Member Limited Liability Company). Urquía Carreño pressured Valdés García to hold the trial or lose his job at the company, violating Masonic Law yet again, as the distinct separation of powers was codified into the bylaws of the Supreme Court of Masonic Justice when it was first created.

When journalists investigated this business connection, they also discovered that since the events of the protests in 2021, Urquía Carreño's construction company, SME Edificia, had on three separate occasions been subjected to intense and tedious investigations for alleged misconduct and malpractice by agents of the State Security Unit. It was also discovered that State Security agents told Urquía Carreño that if he complied with their wishes, they would leave his company alone.

On February 22, 2024, only 48 hours after the first trial, the Supreme Court of Masonic Justice officially expelled Viñas Alonso from the Grand Lodge of Cuba and from the brotherhood of Freemasonry for a total of seven years. Viñas Alonso was given very short notice and could attend the trial, and Second Chamber President Brindisi Limonta was not informed of the proceedings. The Supreme Court's expulsion decision outcome document was not adorned with any signatures or any official seals.

Brindisi Limonta expressed his displeasure that he was not invited to the oral hearing, and noted that this "oral hearing" did not even take place in the courthouse on the tenth floor of the National Masonic Temple, and most likely further violated the separation of powers because it was held in Urquía Carreño's office on the eleventh floor, the same office that was supposed to be under investigation by the police for the initial theft.

Later that day, on February 22, Valdés García disbarred Brindisi Limonta as a magistrate of the Supreme Court of Masonic Justice. Brindisi Limonta insisted that his disbarment was illegal, because Valdés García should have recused himself from the case to begin with.

Many Cuban Freemasons considered this as an act of retribution by Urquía Carreño, and questioned the legality of the Supreme Court's decision, because Urquía Carreño was in violation of his own expulsion at the time of the sentencing. They alleged that Urquía Carreño was either complicit in the theft or was attempting to cause a distraction so that people would stop asking about the stolen Llansó money. They also noted that the outcome document's lack of signatures or seals indicated that the expulsion was not legally binding.

On March 19, 2024, Pompilio Portuondo, a Cuban Freemason on an exchange program with the Grand Lodge of Colombia, wrote on Facebook that he believed a grand conspiracy was taking place in Cuba to cover up the theft. He wrote that certain members of the Grand Lodge were either complicit in the coverup or directly responsible for the theft; Grand Secretary Misiel Hernandez Peraza was alleged to be an active agent in Military Intelligence, Grand Treasurer Airam Cervera Reigosa was allegedly an accomplice in the robbery, Supreme Court of Masonic Justice President Ernesto Valdés García, Yamil Valiente, accountant Rolando Mena, Calos Lorenzo Perez, and Magistrate of the Supreme Court of Masonic Justice Inti Paneca were also all allegedly involved in the plot. He requested that any Lodge in Florida or anywhere else in the United States deny these men asylum or membership in their Lodges. He ended by stating that he would continue to post the names of people he believed were collaborators in the Cuban regime.

Ángel Santiesteban Prats reported that he believed that the State Security Unit would most likely use the situation to take Viñas Alonso away from the office of Grand Commander, writing that: "[President Díaz-Canel and State Security] never forgave [Viñas Alonso]. He's become a 'counterrevolutionary.'"

==== Urquía Carreño ejected from the Grand Lodge ====
On March 24, 2024, the Upper House of the Grand Lodge of Cuba was scheduled to convene, and as Urquía Carreño was preparing to convene the session, a rise of 300 men chanting rang through the chamber, and echoed off the walls: "Get out of here thief! You scoundrel! You traitor! Out thief! Out scoundrel! Out traitor! Out thief! Out scoundrel! Out traitor!" Urquía Carreño refused to leave the room at first, but the chanting grew louder, and everyone present demanded his resignation. Urquía Carreño told them that he would complain to the Registry of Associations of the Ministry of Justice, but one of the Masters reminded him that they had no authority in that room.

Urquía Carreño did leave the room, and once he had done so, the Upper House of the Grand Lodge elected former Grand Master Ernesto Zamora Fernández (who had served as Grand Master during the protests in 2021) as interim President of the Upper House of the Grand Lodge. Zamora Fernández took the chair, and declared that all decrees and declarations that had ever been issued since January 25 were considered void, including the referral of all those individuals of whom he had sent up to the Supreme Court.

==== Juan Alberto Kessel Linares elected as Grand Master ====
Late in the day on March 24, Juan Alberto Kessel Linares was elected as the new Grand Master of the Grand Lodge of Cuba to replace Urquía Carreño.

On March 30, a week after his appointment as Grand Master, Kessel Linares accused Urquía Carreño of having stolen an additional $2,360 in August 2023. The money, according to Kessel Linares, had been given to him by the serving Grand Treasurer at the time, Salvador Orestes Arango Troncoso. When Urquía Carreño was eventually asked about the money by Grand Secretary Misiel Hernández Peraza, Urquía Carreño allegedly informed him that the money was in the possession of the recently elected Grand Treasurer, Airam Cervera. Kessel Linares then revealed that the Grand Lodge had filed an official complaint with the National Revolutionary Police at the Zapata Police Station in Havana.

==== Urquía Carreño takes back his office ====
While he was not able to enter the building, Urquía Carreño still refused to step down, and called the election a coup d'etat, citing that the Grand Lodge of Cuba had not followed the proper procedures to impeach him. He said that because the Grand Lodge had not provided the Office of Associations at the Ministry of Justice with the official minutes of the session in which they ejected him from his office, their decision was not legally binding. He was subsequently endorsed by the Ministry of Justice. To prevent Kessel Linares from carrying out the office of Grand Master, the Ministry of Justice blocked the bank accounts of the Grand Lodge, prohibited them from carrying out certain activities, and suspended the Grand Lodge of Cuba from their Office of Associations, which is the office of Justice that oversees the Registry of Associations. Urquía Carreño told the Grand Lodge that if they continued in their current course of action, there would be "...more drastic and harmful measures..." that the Ministry of Justice could pursue.

Over the next several months resumed the normal work of the office of Grand Master. Urquía Carreño also leveled accusations against all those Freemasons who had spoken to the press about the situation, that they had broken their solemn covenants and vows of secrecy to the fraternity. State television channels then sided with Urquía Carreño, urging the public to remain calm.

Caridad del Rosario Diego Bello, the head of the Office of Religious Affairs, then held a private meeting with a group of Freemasons. She told them that she had no knowledge about anything that had been happening, but encouraged everyone to abide by the Ministry of Justice so that the fraternity could continue to operate in Cuba.

==== Urquía Carreño resigns ====
On August 18, 2024, a special session of more than a hundred Freemasons was called by Urquía Carreño to gather at the theatre hall of the Grand Lodge of Cuba, on the 3rd floor of the building. One Cuban Freemason told reporters that: "...he had manipulated a circus to stay in office. He's shameless, they were lies after lies; all the brothers were standing asking him to hand over the keys to his office." The people in the theatre started chanting: "Hand over and leave!" After tensions had escalated, Urquía Carreño left the theatre to go back to his office. However, the Freemasons followed him up to the eleventh floor. Urquía Carreño agreed to meet with representatives of the delegation in his office, so three men were chosen to represent them. The three men sat with three of Urquía Carreño's men, and discussed terms of negotiation, while the rest of the delegation waited in the hallway.

On August 18, 2024, after two hours of negotiation, Urquía Carreño finally relented and agreed to tender his resignation. In his resignation, he said that it was: "for the good of the institution."

Mayker Filema Duarte assumed the role of Acting Grand Master until an election could be held, and immediately launched a financial audit of the entire Grand Lodge. At the beginning of September, Filema Duarte accused Urquía Carreño of the theft of yet another $MN2,116,555.33, stolen sometime between January and August 2024.

Grand Master Filema Duarte then stripped former Grand Master Urquía Carreño of all his Masonic rights, and referred him to appear in front of the Supreme Court of Masonic Justice, so that they could review the case.

On September 10, 2024, Urquía Carreño was then arrested and taken into custody by the National Revolutionary Police at Zanja y Dragones Police Station, the same police station which had launched the theft investigation on January 12. His official charge was the embezzlement of $MN754,410.54 and US$2,700. Urquía Carreño and Airam Cervera were given a travel limit by the Cuban government, prevented from leaving the island with any potential stolen cash.

In 2025, Urquía Carreño gave an interview on a YouTube channel associated with the Cuban government in which he denied all wrongdoing, and reiterated his belief that Viñas Alonso was the leader of an anti-government conspiracy alongside Gerardo Cepero and Ángel Santiesteban to remove him from office. He insisted that everything had been orchestrated by this group, beginning with the theft and ending with Urquía Carreño's eventual resignation.

==== Mayker Filema Duarte elected ====
On Friday, September 20, 2024, Acting Grand Master Mayker Filema Duarte was unanimously elected Grand Master of the Grand Lodge of Cuba, during the regular annual and semiannual sessions of the High Chamber of the Grand Lodge of Cuba. Due to the special nature of the circumstances, Filema Duarte was understood to only have been elected to finish-out the rest of the term that Urquía Carreño would have normally completed until the next scheduled semi-annual meeting of the High Chamber in March, 2025, when the elections for the positions at the Grand Lodge usually occur.

Over the next six months, many Cuban Freemasons started to believe that Filema Duarte was simply an extension of the same brand of corruption and government abuse that Urquía Carreño had been. He had also been risen through the ranks under the administration of Urquía Carreño. The fact that the Office of Associations and its director Miriam García publicly gave their support to Filema Duarte raised their suspicions, leading them to suspect that he was yet another government puppet.

On March 23, 2025, the High Chamber met for their normal semi-annual session (they meet every September and March), and old business was conducted with Filema Duarte presiding. When it was time for new business to be conducted, one of the Freemasons reminded him about holding elections, at which point Filema Duarte suspended the session of the High Chamber. The election did not occur. The Cuban Freemasons started shouting "Hold my Cuba Libra!" Filema Duarte's decision was later supported by the Cuban Ministry of Justice and the Communist Party. Also supporting Filema Duarte's decision were Grand Secretary Juliannys Galano, Grand Treasurer Juan Carlos Yero, and the President of the Supreme Court of Masonic Justice, Rancel Montero.

After the suspended meeting, pressure mounted on the office of the Grand Master. Filema Duarte announced another session of the Grand Lodge would occur in May. However, he canceled this meeting after receiving what he called threats against his person. Government agents from the Office of Associations then interrogated members who had called for the Grand Master's removal.

These interrogations did not concern Filema Duarte; the government was attempting to gather evidence for a case on Grand Commander Viñas Alonso. The Office of Associations informed these Freemasons that Viñas Alonso was occupying the office of Grand Commander illegally, and that they had to elect a new Grand Commander. One Cuban Freemason later told journalists: "It is the plinth of cynicism, Viñas Alonso isn't the problem! We need to get rid of Filema Duarte! Filema Duarte is a stone in his shoes."

==== Mayker Filema Duarte ejected, Juan Alberto Kessel Linares reelected ====
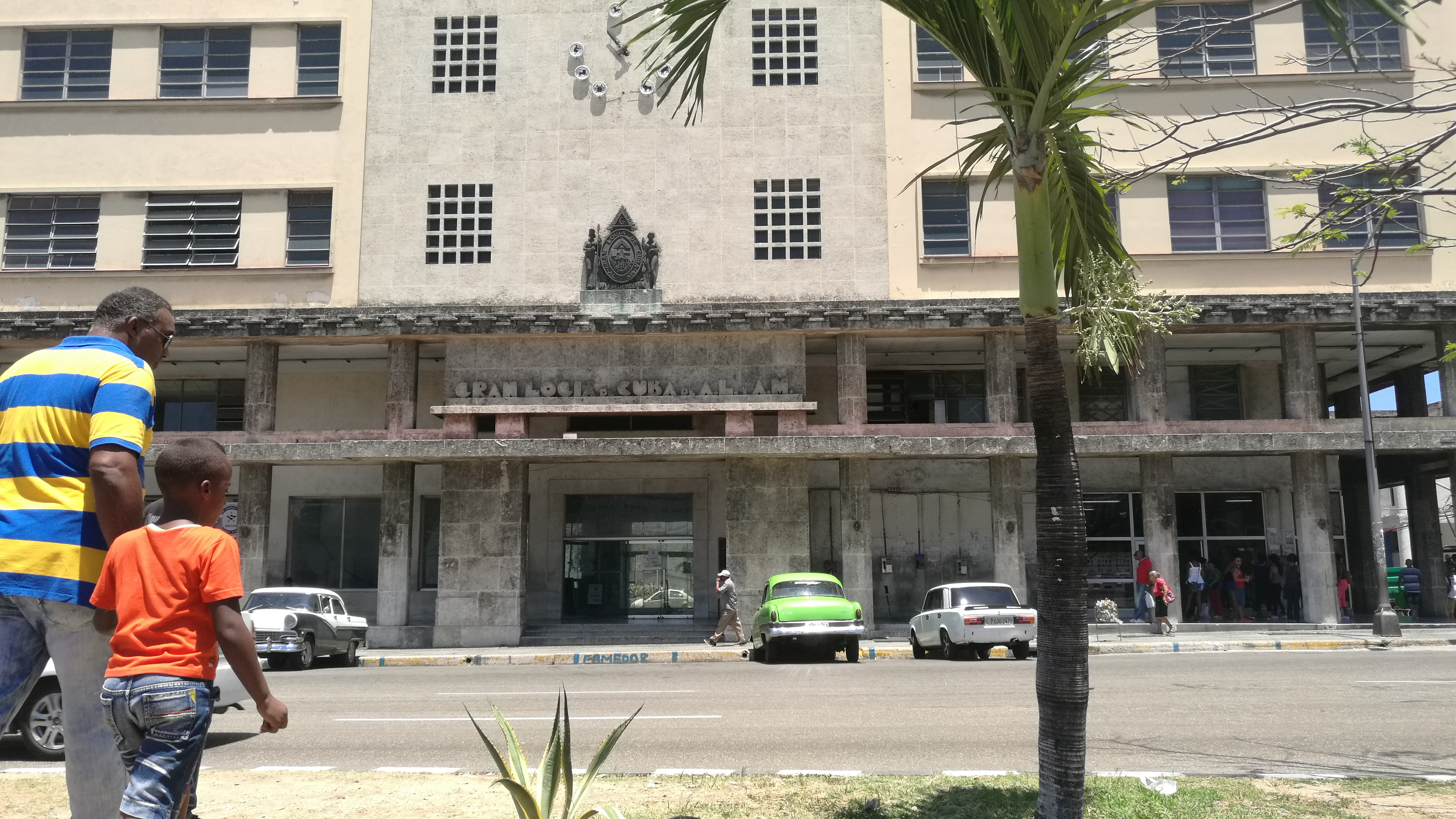
Entrance to the National Masonic Temple, seen here in 2017.

On Sunday, May 25, 2025, after Filema Duarte still refused to hold elections or resign from office, representative from 117 Cuban Lodges gathered at the National Masonic Temple alongside hundreds of other Freemasons, and demanded his dismissal. Because Filema Duarte had ordered the conference hall to be locked, the Freemasons gathered in the lobby out front of the hall, at the foot of the statue of Carlos Manuel de Céspedes. They sang the National Anthem of Cuba and proceeded to hold the meeting without Filema Duarte or his staff present, and ejected Filema Duarte from the Grand Lodge.

Juan Alberto Kessel Linares was reelected as Acting Grand Master of Cuba. Plain-clothes police officers and agents of the State Security Unit were also present at the meeting, capturing photographs and videos of everyone present.

Over the course of June, Cuban Freemasons who stood in opposition to Filema Duarte reported that they were under constant surveillance by agents of the government, that their internet was being strategically cut by the government, that power outages were being arranged to target the specific homes of oppositional Freemasons. They also alleged that there were also several "strategic" arrests used as intimidation tactics.

On June 14, 2025, Kessel Linares appeared with his Cabinet Elect on the steps of the Grand Lodge of Cuba to hold a press conference, where they denounced the actions of Filema Duarte, of who they said was occupying the office illegally. They also stated that on May 26, they had gone to the Ministry of Justice to file an official complaint against Filema Duarte, but the Ministry of Justice had rejected any claim that Filema Duarte was not the duly elected Grand Master of Cuba. They stated that a Ministry of Justice official named Miriam García, Director of the Office of Associations, had been interceding directly on behalf of Filema Duarte.

On June 21, 2025, Kessel Linares was summoned to appear at the Infanta y Manglar Police Station, where he was interrogated and threatened with charges of disturbing the peace by a State Security officer with a violent reputation of the mistreatment of anti-government dissidents, Lieutenant Colonel Kenia María Morales Larrea.

==== Juan Alberto Kessel Linares and Viñas Alonso arrested ====
On July 4, 2025, agents from the State Security Unit issued summons to Acting Grand Mater Kessel Linares and Acting Grand Secretary Víctor Bravo Cabañas at the Picota Police Station, where they were again officially arrested by Lieutenant Colonel Kenia María Morales Larrea, but they were later released with warning notices.

Filema Duarte called a special session of the High Chamber to occur on July 6. Many Cuban Freemasons considered this an illegal act, because they had voted him out of office, and believed that he did not have the authority to call sessions.

After they were released, Kessel Linares and Bravo Cabañas both posted to Facebook that they were concerned about the intimidation tactics used by the government, and called for a peaceful demonstration on July 6.

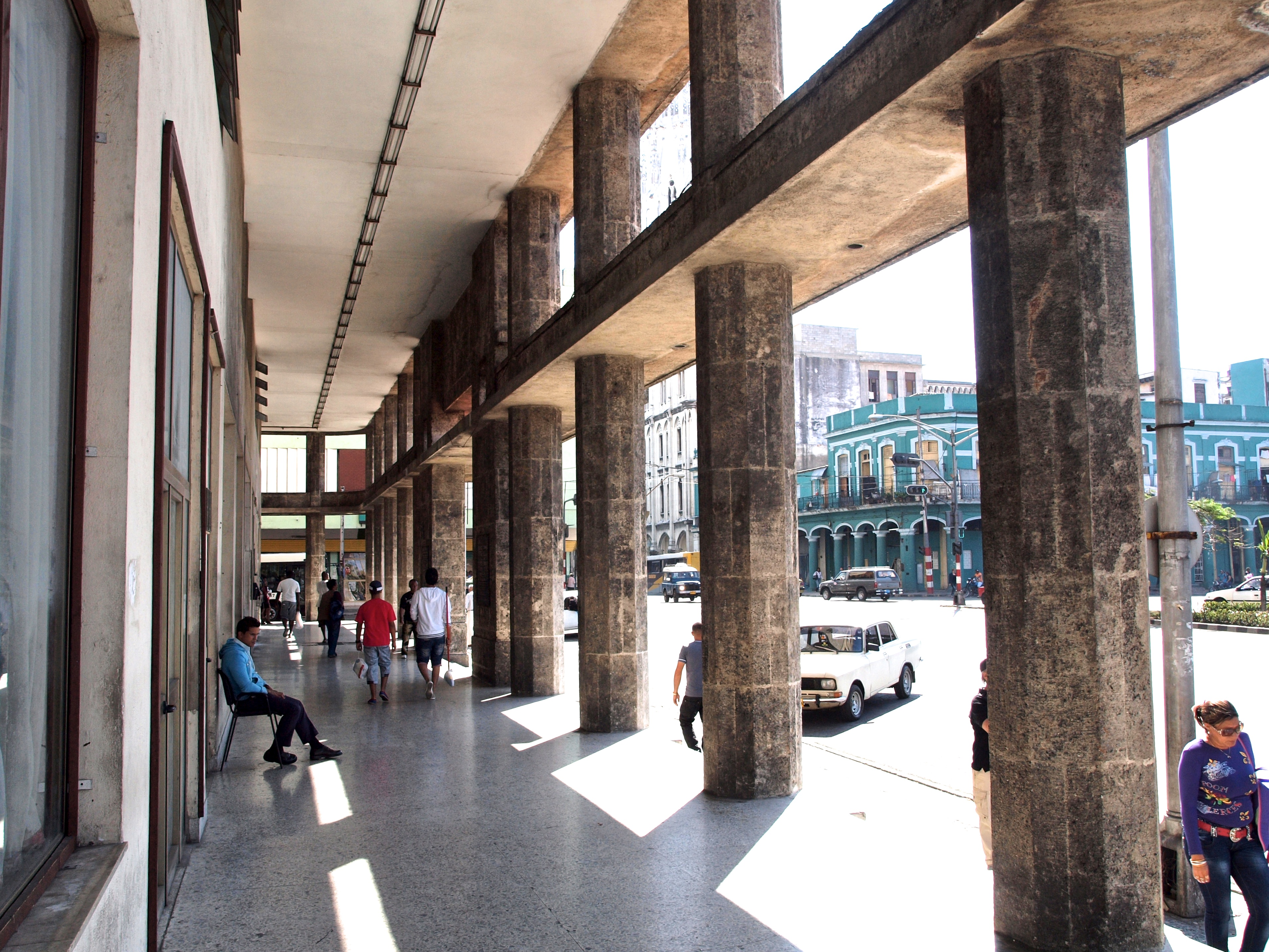
Exterior of the National Masonic Temple, where these events occurred. Seen here in 2013.

On July 6, 2025, furious that their Acting Grand Master had been arrested, dozens of members of the High Chamber held a large protest in front of the National Masonic Temple in rejection of Filema Duarte's authority to call any session of the High Chamber. The session had been scheduled to occur later that day. However, when they tried to enter the building, the Tyler was joined by three Freemasons who sided with Filema Duarte – Jesús Martínez Frómeta, Raúl Pérez Martín and Rolando Céspedes Mena – who refused the protesters entry to the building. The two sides pushed and shoved. The protestors cried and shouted for Filema Duarte to exit the building, and he did come down to try and meet with them. But Former Grand Master Ernesto Zamora Fernández then, in a video which appeared on Zamora Fernández's Facebook profile, was seen leading a chant of "Out, traitor! Get out!" Filema Duarte retreated back into his office, with the Freemasons still shouting at him that he was a traitor to the Brotherhood and a puppet of the Cuban government.

Filema Duarte issued a statement that he had cancelled the session of the High Chamber, in which he also stated that he would not be stepping aside as Grand Master.

On Facebook, Zamora Fernández wrote: "This is the face of the dictatorship dressed as the Grand Master of the Cuban Masons, his name: Maikel Filema. He is worse than Agent Collera Vento. Dismissed by the Masons, he clings to power with the support of the government... Your betrayal, your lack of civility, your lack of morality, your ignorance. Your baseness, your lack of ethics. Your coarseness, your bravado do not represent us. In the eyes of the world, you will never be seen as a Masonic Brother. You will only be remembered as a traitor to your Brothers and your people."

On July 8, 2025, the Cuban Minister of Justice, Óscar Manuel Silvera Martínez, gave an interview on Cuban state television in which he outright rejected any claim that the Ministry of Justice or any other department of the Cuban government was carrying out a campaign of intimidation against the members of the Grand Lodge of Cuba. He told the people of Cuba that his Ministry, which oversees the Office of Associations and the Registry of Associations, has the right to do so under Cuban Law 54, which was passed in 1985, also known as the Cuban Associations Law. The Minister stated that there were 2,261 registered associations in Cuba, with 1,141 of them being fraternal associations, and the majority of the persons on this registry are Freemasons.

Sometime before July 29, 2025, Kessel Linares was once again summoned to appear at the Picota Police Station, where he was arrested and taken into custody. His charge issued by the police stated that: "[Having violated his restraining order, he was] seen near the premises of the Grand Lodge on Sunday, July 6, when the Freemasons protested there..."

On July 29, 2025, Grand Commander Viñas Alonso was summoned to appear at Costa y Diez de Octubre Police Station, where he was subsequently arrested. He was charged with the illegal crime of currency trafficking to the total of US$100. The charge alleges that Viñas Alonso attempted to exchange $100 on the black market, and came after a tip-off by an anonymous informant. Advocates of Viñas Alonso said that if he had exchanged that money, he only intended to use it to buy food and supplies for the Llansó retirement home, which was again facing a food shortage.

Viñas Alonso later wrote on Facebook that the money, which had agreed to be converted by a unanimous vote of the Board of Trustees at the Llansó retirement home, was made an at unofficial exchange rate of $MN378 for US$100, instead of the government-mandated exchange rate of $MN120. He said that there had been two such occasions of unofficial market exchange, and technically that does constitute an economic crime in Cuba, but that people are rarely prosecuted for such a low sum of money. He was then issued a work-from-home order, and restricted from leaving Cuba.

==== Urquía Carreño sends restitution payments ====
In August, 2025, government agents from the Ministry of Justice showed up at the National Masonic Temple with some bankers, and delivered 1 million Cuban pesos to the Grand Lodge. They informed the Grand Lodge that this money had been discovered during the course of the police investigation into Urquía Carreño, and that they should expect 3 million more pesos soon after. Filema Duarte and the office of the Grand Master published Special Circular No. 127, in which they asserted that the accountant Gertrudis Mena had digitally manipulated and falsified bank statements to steal and embezzle large sums of money, of which former Grand Master Urquía Carreño had been an accomplice. The total volume of embezzlement, not including the theft of the Llansó fund, was valued at around US$40,000.

While many Freemasons praised the justice system for prosecuting against Urquía Carreño, they also stated that they believed it was just a tactic used by Filema Duarte as a method of distraction from his own scandal.

In September 2025, a second payment was received by the Grand Lodge of Cuba from Former Grand Master Urquía Carreño and Former Grand Treasurer Airam Cervera Reigosa, totaling 4 million Cuban pesos. Grand Master Filema Duarte announced that the total sum of 5 million pesos was deposited into the account of the Grand Lodge of Cuba. Technically, both deposits were made under the name Airam Cervera, but it was taken implicitly that this was repayment for what both men owed the Grand Lodge.

==== Kessel Linares drops his claim ====
In September 2025, one week before the session regularly scheduled session of the semi-annual meeting of the High Chamber of the Grand Lodge of Cuba, Acting Grand Master Kessel Linares reiterated that the Director of the Office of Associations at the Ministry of Justice was still attempting to interfere with the proceedings and to keep Filema Duarte in power.

Three days before the semi-annual meeting, Acting Grand Secretary Víctor Bravo resigned, and called for a boycott of the session, telling the members that the session would be pointless.

On September 28, 2025, at the semi-annual meeting of the High Chamber, Acting Grand Master Kessel Linares announced that he had dropped his claim to the office of Grand Master, and proposed to dismiss the removal of Grand Master Filema Duarte. A minority of the Lodges present voted yea, but the vote did pass (indicating that a large portion abstained). After the vote, a large number of Freemasons were seen leaving the building with what appeared to be looks of disgust and outrage on their faces. Dozens of Freemasons interviewed by the press informed them that they felt betrayed once again, and believed that Kessel Linares had finally caved to the pressure being applied to him by the Ministry of Justice. One Freemason said: "Freemasonry in Cuba is over." Another said: "Kessel has betrayed his oath."

One Cuban Freemason was quoted as saying: "The regime has had us infiltrated for decades, but now the agents have been brazenly exposed. Many have demobilized out of disillusionment, but we cannot give in."

==== José Manuel Valdés Menéndez-Cuesta elected Grand Master ====
On October 25, 2025, the Grand Lodge of Cuba held general elections, and José Manuel Valdés Menéndez-Cuesta, a member of the Federico Valdés Lodge in Cotorro, was elected as Grand Master of the Grand Lodge of Cuba. Valdés has over 25 years of experience in Cuban Freemasonry.

In November, 2025, Miriam García Mariño, the Director of the Office of Associations at the Ministry of Justice signed Resolution 7, in which the Ministry officially declared that the elections of October 25 were considered legal and appropriate. In Resolution 7, the Ministry officially stated that Former Grand Master Filema Duarte had disregarded the will of the majority by seeking to delay the institutional function of the Grand Lodge of Cuba. The Ministry also urged the new Grand Master to: "...“achieve unity, institutionalization, and the proper development of the transition process."

Some Cuban Freemasons, while relieved that Filema Duarte was no longer protected by the Ministry of Justice, were skeptical that the government would not still attempt to control the fraternity, stating that they believed the institution would be manipulated in more subtle ways going forward, instead of the overt and direct methods they had been using.

==== Supreme Court of Masonic Justice expels members ====
In June 2026, the Supreme Court of Masonic Justice permanently expelled eight members from the Grand Lodge and Supreme Council of Cuba, stripping them of their Masonic rights and privileges. Among those members expelled were;

- Former Grand Master Urquía Carreño, officially expelled for "fraud, abuse, and embezzlement of Masonic property or funds."
- Former Grand Treasurer Airam Cervera Reigosa, officially expelled for "fraud, abuse, and embezzlement of Masonic property or funds."
- Former President of the Supreme Court of Masonic Justice Rancell Montero Romero (also serves as Vice President of the Yoruba Association of Cuba), officially "expelled for perjury, malicious removal or destruction of documents, severe misconduct in a Masonic role, and malicious infractions accompanied by gross negligence and potential harm."
- Jesús Martínez Frómeta, officially expelled for "treason against the Brotherhood," and sanctioned for throwing alcohol into the faces of protestors on July 6, 2025.
- Igor Larramendi Ador, former president of the Jurisprudence and General Affairs Commission, expelled and sanctioned for inciting violence.
- Juan Carlos Yero Ramos, former Grand Treasurer, expelled and sanctioned for inciting violence.
- Juliannis Galano Gómez, former Grand Secretary, expelled and sanctioned for inciting violence.
- An unknown Freemason

On June 5, 2026, the Grand Secretariat issued Special Circular No. 15 confirming these expulsions. In this circular, the Grand Secretariat wrote that: "It is necessary to banish from our symbolic Freemasonry any hint of dictatorial position or those that second it, because this is an existential threat to Freemasonry... [we are] cleaning the affront of the traitors who broke their word and oaths and acted without hesitation against Masonic democracy."

Sergio Rafael Vidal Águila stated that the decision was: "...not only an act of justice, but of restoration, because it was very difficult to accept those persons as deserving of membership… because of what it represents that they violated their oaths without shame and were part of what, without a doubt, was not only a collection of ambitions but the service of outdated men in the shadow of a political power that used them to persecute Freemasons within the Institution itself."

The Court also affirmed that the actions of the protestors on June 5, 2025 were in their eyes a legitimate attempt to restore institutional order.

The expulsions were submitted pending their ratification at the semi-annual meeting of the High Chamber of the Grand Lodge of Cuba, in September 2026.

== See also ==
- Simone Tebet
- Cabildo (Cuba)
- Las Clavellinas Uprising
- Freemasonry in Latin America
- Knights of the Order of Light
- Revolution of the Suns and Rays
- URSAL
- Aponte conspiracy
