= First Mexican Republic =

Period of Mexican history from 1824 to 1835

Coordinates: 19°26′N 99°8′W

United Mexican States Estados Unidos Mexicanos
- 1824–1835
- Flag Coat of arms
- Motto: Religión, Independencia, Unión; Religion, Independence, Union
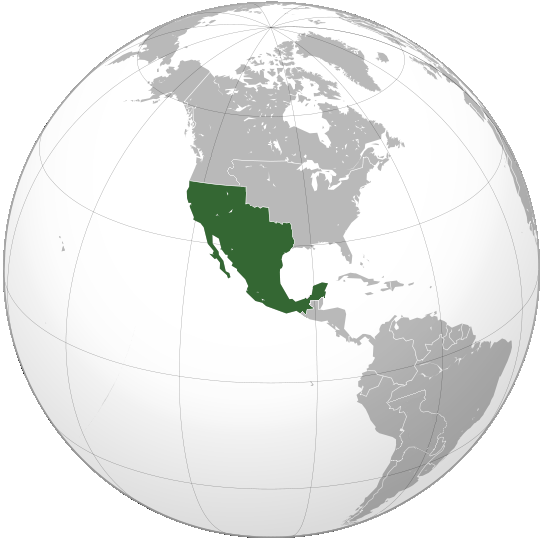
- Mexico in 1830
- Capital: Mexico City
- Common languages: Spanish (official), Nahuatl, Yucatec Maya, Mixtecan languages, Zapotec languages
- Religion: Catholicism (official religion)
- Government: Federal presidential republic
- President
  - 1824–1829: Guadalupe Victoria
  - 1829: Vicente Guerrero
  - 1830–1832: Anastasio Bustamante
  - 1833–1834: Valentín Gómez Farías
  - 1834–1835: Antonio López de Santa Anna
- Legislature: Congress
  - Upper house: Senate
  - Lower house: Chamber of Deputies
- History
  - Constitution of 1824 promulgated: 4 October 1824
  - Expulsion of Spaniards: December 1827
  - Mutiny of La Acordada: 30 November 1828
  - Failed Spanish attempt to reconquer Mexico: July – September 1829
  - Terán Expedition to Texas: 1827–1831
  - Gómez Farías Anticlerical Campaign: 1833–1834
  - Santa Anna overthrows Gómez Farías; dissolves congress: April 1834
  - Constitution of 1824 repealed: 23 October 1835

Population
  - 1824: 6,500,000
  - 1834: 7,734,292
- Currency: Mexican real
Preceded by	Succeeded by
Provisional Government of Mexico	Centralist Republic of Mexico
- Today part of: Mexico; United States

The First Mexican Republic, known also as the First Federal Republic (Spanish: Primera República Federal), existed from 1824 to 1835. It was a federated republic, established by the Constitution of 1824, the first constitution of independent Mexico, and officially designated the United Mexican States (Spanish: Estados Unidos Mexicanos,). It ended in 1835, when conservatives under Antonio López de Santa Anna transformed it into a unitary state, the Centralist Republic of Mexico.

The republic was proclaimed on 1 November 1823 by the Supreme Executive Power, months after the fall of the Mexican Empire ruled by emperor Agustin I, a former royalist military officer-turned-insurgent for independence. The federation was formally and legally established on 4 October 1824, when the Federal Constitution of the United Mexican States came into force.

The First Republic was plagued through its entire twelve-year existence by severe financial and political instability. Political controversies, ever since the drafting of the constitution tended to center around whether Mexico should be a federal or a centralist state, with wider liberal and conservative causes attaching themselves to each faction respectively. With the exception of the inaugural office holder, Guadalupe Victoria, every single administration during the First Republic was overthrown by military coup d'état.

The First Republic would finally collapse after the overthrow of the liberal president Valentín Gómez Farías, through a rebellion led by his former vice-president, General Antonio López de Santa Anna who had switched sides. Once in power, the conservatives, who had long been critical of the federal system and blamed it for the nation's instability, repealed the Constitution of 1824 on 23 October 1835, and the Federal Republic became a unitary state, the Centralist Republic. The unitary regime was formally established on 30 December 1836, with the enactment of the seven constitutional laws.

== Background ==
=== Independence ===
The Spanish Empire disintegrated in the wake of Napoleon's invasion of Spain and the overthrow of the Spanish Bourbons in 1808. Throughout Spain and her colonies there was a widespread refusal to recognize Napoleon's brother Joseph II as the new French-backed king of Spain. The cleric Miguel Hidalgo y Costilla, who had long been part of a circle of intellectuals who sought to reform the colonial system triggered the Mexican War of Independence in 1810 by accusing the Spanish ruling classes of seeking to recognize Joseph Bonaparte, while proclaiming loyalty to the imprisoned Ferdinand VII. The subsequent uprising would go on to seriously threaten the capital yet it was ultimately defeated within a year and Hidalgo was captured and executed.

The war would continue and be organized under Jose Maria Morelos who would gain control over much of southern New Spain. At the Congress of Chilpancingo in 1813 he renounced loyalty to Ferdinand and expounded a plan for an independent, Republican Mexico. The Constitution of Apatzingán was ratified on 22 October 1814, but it would never come into effect. The tide of war began to turn against the insurgents, and Morelos was captured and executed in 1815.

Meanwhile, in Spain, the Spanish government in exile, the liberal dominated Cortes of Cádiz had included representatives from the colonies, and taken into account many of the colonial grievances which were leading to independence. The consequent liberal Constitution of 1812, was promulgated during the Morelos insurgency. It established a system of 'provincial deputations' which granted more autonomy to local governments in the colonies while also providing for freedom of speech. The newly liberated Mexican press however simply inflamed anti-Spanish sentiment, Morelos' rebellion continued, and on the pretext of necessity for subduing the rebels, the constitution was suspended in New Spain the same year it was proclaimed, making Mexican liberals lose hope of attaining reform within the colonial system, while not forgetting the local provincial autonomy that they had temporarily been granted.

Independence was finally gained in 1821 under Agustín de Iturbide's Plan of Iguala which was a conservative reaction against the outbreak of the Trienio Liberal in Spain, but also a compromise with those Mexican liberals who sought equality before the law. Mexico was to have its independence under a commonwealth system with constitutional monarchy maintaining ties to Spain and commissioners were sent to Spain to offer the throne to a Spanish prince. The Spanish government refused the offer and a popular demonstration led to Iturbide himself assuming the throne. The Emperor immediately however began to clash with legislature and showed himself determined to have supreme authority over the government, even shutting congress down and replacing it with a body of loyalists. Iturbide struggled to pay the army, and eventually Santa Anna pronounced in favor of a Federal Republic in his Plan of Casa Mata. After being unable to suppress the rebellion Iturbide reconvened congress and offered his abdication after which he was exiled from the nation. He would attempt to return the following year while Mexico was under a provisional government only to be captured and executed.

=== Provisional Government of Mexico ===
Executive Triumvirate
Nicolás Bravo	Guadalupe Victoria	Pedro Negrete
31 March 1823 – 10 October 1824

Substitute Members
José Michelena	Miguel Domínguez	Vicente Guerrero
1 April 1823 – 10 October 1824		2 July 1823 – 10 October 1824

The provisional government was led by a triumvirate consisting of Nicolas Bravo, Pedro Negrete, and Guadalupe Victoria, the latter who would eventually go on to become the first president of Mexico. Congress organized elections for a new Constituent Congress that was meant to draft a new constitution, and the newly elected body met on 7 November 1823.

Controversy now raged over whether the new republic was going to be a federal system or a unitary system. A certain level of local autonomy had already been granted through a system of provincial deputations introduced through the Spanish Constitution of 1812. A de facto state of federalism to a degree already existed when the constituent congress met. The most prominent opponent of sustaining and expanding the federal system however was Father Mier who had previously made a name for himself as a critic of Iturbide. He argued that the nation needed a strong centralized government to guard against Spanish attempts to reconquer her former colony, and that a federation rather suited a situation in which previously well established sovereign states were attempting to unite as had happened with the United States. Federation for Mexico, according to Mier would then be more an act of separation rather than unification and only lead to internal conflict.

The arguments for federation prevailed however, motivated by the autonomy already gained, and an eagerness to reap the salaries that would accompany local bureaucracies. For historian Timothy Anna, "the transition to a federal republic [as opposed to the initial triumph of independence] was the real 'revolution' because the old gave way to the new in Mexican history." Mexico decided upon federation as a practical compromise between the need for effective national government and the desire for granting the provinces a voice. Miguel Ramos Arizpe, former Mexican deputy to the Spanish Cortes and one of the champions of federalism was tasked with drafting the new constitution and he modeled the document on the Constitution of the United States. The completed constitution was published on 4 October 1824.

In the new federated republican era, the transition from the colonial legal system was not easy. Crown edicts no longer had force and new legal codes had not yet come into being. No one knew which laws were valid, there were vacancies in the courts, and few trained lawyers. States were accorded the power over most civil and criminal legal matters. The separate court for merchants, the consulado, was abolished, but the military and church courts retained jurisdiction over soldiers and clergy respectively as part of their fuero. For members of indigenous communities, the removal of colonial-era protections of their community lands and their access to the special General Indian Court made them more vulnerable in the new federated republican order.

The first presidential elections were held the same week that the constitution was promulgated and Guadalupe Victoria, war hero of independence, and one of the three members of the triumvirate was elected the first president of the First Mexican Republic.

== History ==
=== Victoria administration ===
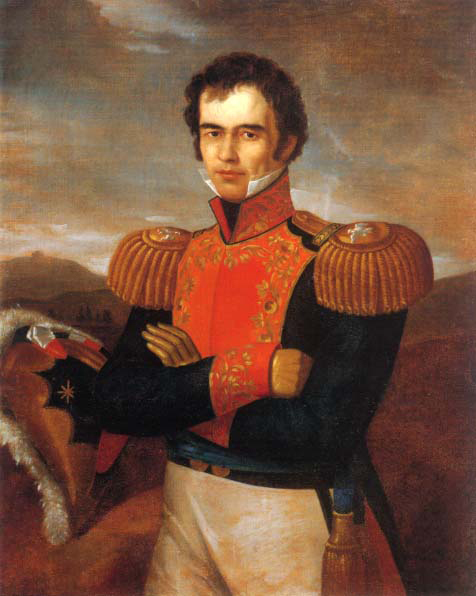
Guadalupe Victoria

Fierce political controversy over federalism and centralism continued during the Victoria Administration, finding itself based in Mexico's Masonic lodges. Conservative supporters of centralism and surviving supporters of monarchy tended to belong to the Scottish Rite and were called Esoceses while liberal supporters of federalism tended to gather in the York Rite and were called Yorkinos. Participants in political discussions at the lodges were bound by secrecy, and there was some effort in the government to ban such secret societies, but it came to nothing.

In order to fund the government the Victoria administration had taken out a loan from a British banking house, but the bank failed in 1827, leading to a financial crisis in the Mexican government.

Tensions against the Spaniards who remained in Mexico were also rising at this time and they sought to defend themselves by supporting the Escoceses. Calls to expel the Spaniards from the country challenged the tenets of the newly established liberal constitution, which stressed equality before the law. The leading liberal intellectual, José María Luis Mora, was opposed to Spaniards' expulsion as a matter of principle, but also on practical grounds, since Spanish merchants had been vital to the flourishing of the colonial economy. Nonetheless, the Spaniards were expelled in December, 1827, under the pretext of suppressing sedition.

On 23 December 1827, the conservative Escoseses proclaimed the Plan of Montaño, demanding the expulsion of Joel Roberts Poinsett (United States Minister to Mexico), the end to secret societies, and the dismissal of the current cabinet, the latter measure due to the belief that the Yorkino dominated government was about to take decisive measures to suppress the Escoceses.The insurrection was ironically led by Victoria's own vice-president, Nicolás Bravo, but it was suppressed and Bravo was exiled.

More violence would follow the presidential elections of 1828. They were won by the conservative candidate Gomez Pedraza, but supporters of the liberal candidate Vicente Guerrero refused to recognize the results and petitioned congress to nullify them. The efforts were rejected, and the government took advantage of the electoral challenge to begin prosecuting the liberal opposition. This in turn only inflamed further violence which spread to the capital. As the tide seemed to be turning against him, Gomez Pedraza fled the country, and Guerrero was able to have his victory ratified by congress.

=== Guerrero administration ===
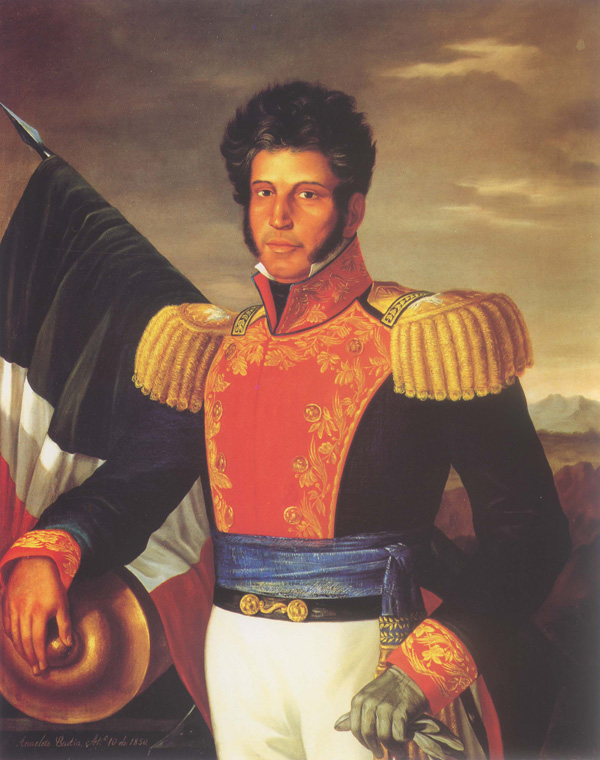
Vicente Guerrero

For Guerrero's supporters, a visibly mixed-race man from Mexico's periphery becoming president of Mexico was a step toward in what one 1829 pamphleteer called "the reconquest of this land by its legitimate owners" and called Guerrero "that immortal hero, favorite son of Nezahualcoyotzin", the famous ruler of prehispanic Texcoco.

In his inaugural address, he pointed to his long service to the nation fighting for independence, but also importantly to his holding of high office in independent Mexico. He said, "The representatives are to be found in all classes of the people, and the true titles of superiority, the only ones that cause distinction and preference, are discovered wherever talent and virtue appear." In his first address to congress, he pledged that "the administration is obliged to procure the widest possible benefits and apply them from the palace of the rich to the wooden shack of the humble laborer." He went on to extol liberal values of equality before the law and rewards for those with talent and virtue.

The first major crisis faced by the new government was an attempt by Spain to reconquer its former colony, the so-called Barradas Expedition of 1829. Troops were landed at the tropical port of Tampico, upon which they began to succumb to yellow fever and were defeated by the Mexican military. Guerrero had been given emergency powers for the crisis and he was slow to relinquish them even after the crisis had subsided, which became a point of contention for his opponents.

Slavery was abolished, which only substantially affected the Mexican province of Texas,there was an attempt to regulate the press, and the government attempted to alleviate the financial crisis by passing new federal taxes. The new taxes were then ignored by every single state.

Vice President Anastasio Bustamante and the opposition, under the pretext of opposing Guerrero's emergency powers, proclaimed a coup against the government, and Guerrero left the capital to oppose the insurgents, but Bustamante's movement triumphed and he was installed as president in February 1830, with congress subsequently declaring Guerrero to be unfit for office.

=== Bustamante administration ===
With President Bustamante, the escoceses or the Conservative Party came into power for the first time. Lucas Alamán, the preeminent conservative intellectual of the time, would also be added to the cabinet and would play a notable role in guiding government policy.

Strong measures were taken in response to the emerging separatist crisis in Texas, where the amount of American settlers was making it difficult for Mexico to administer the area. Further colonization was prohibited in 1830, and General Manuel de Mier y Terán was sent into the region to build a string of forts. The administration also managed to succeed in substantially alleviating the chronic financial instability. In his address to congress on 1 January 1832, Bustamante recorded surpluses in most of the states and in the federal government.

However, instability would erupt when ex-president Guerrero was captured in January 1831 before being court martialed and executed the following month. Guerrero's execution caused an uproar amongst the opposition, and Bustamante's government was accused of acting increasingly autocratically. The Liberal Party opposition appealed to Santa Anna to pronounce against the government and he eventually began an uprising in January 1832 which lasted until the end of the year and eventually proved to be successful. Manuel Gómez Pedraza was brought back to serve out the remaining three months of the term which he had initially won against Guerrero in 1828. He was succeeded in the elections of 1833 by Santa Anna, then a liberal, with another liberal Valentín Gómez Farías as his vice president.

=== Gómez Farías administration ===
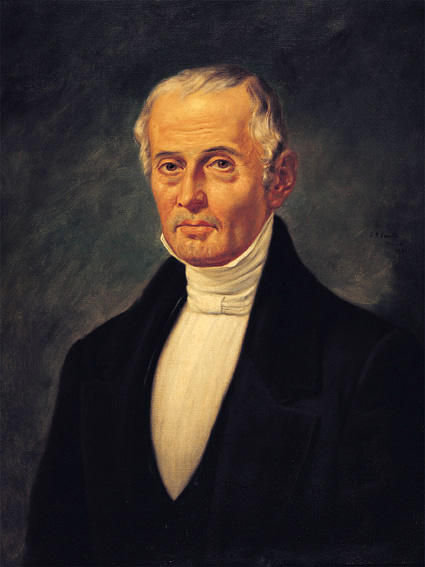
Valentín Gómez Farías

During this time, Santa Anna and Gómez Farías shared power by alternating offices with Santa Anna repeatedly retiring to his estate at Manga de Clavo while Gómez Farías took care of official matters. Gómez Farías attempted to reduce the size of the army and also to pass a radical program of anti-clerical measures. The government closed all church schools including the university at Mexico City. It annulled monastic oaths and claimed for itself the right to pick officials in the church. It also suppressed monasteries in the north of the country. Members of congress wished to prosecute former members of the Bustamante administration, but Gomez Farias sought to moderate these measures. In response to the uprisings that were flaring up around the nation, a Ley de Caso expelled from the country many conservatives, including ex-president Bustamante. Many generals associated with the previous administration were removed from office leading to further opposition. The government around this time also had to deal with an epidemic of cholera.

The uprisings against the nation were mostly pacified, but the opposition continued to clamor for Gómez Farías's overthrow, fueled by the ongoing anti-clerical campaign. Opponents of Gómez Farías had long sought help from vice-president/president Santa Anna in overthrowing the government, and after initially ignoring them, even participating in campaigns against the rebels, he eventually acquiesced in April, 1834. He proclaimed the Plan of Cuernavaca, condemning Gómez Farías's reforms. Gómez Farías was overthrown and prominent liberal and federalist thinkers José María Luis Mora and Lorenzo de Zavala were exiled from the nation. Gómez Farías's reforms would eventually be attempted again by the government during the pivotal La Reforma period.

=== Collapse of the First Republic ===
As part of his revolution Santa Anna dissolved the national congress, state congresses, and replaced state governors and municipal governments with loyalists. He however, also maintained that the Constitution of 1824 was still in effect and held elections for a new congress before the end of the year. Santa Anna at this point retired as he had during the Gomez Farias administration and he was replaced by Miguel Barragan.

On 23 October 1835, the bicameral congress decreed to unite and turn itself into a constituent congress tasked with drafting a new constitution. The resulting centralist document came to be known as the Siete Leyes, and was formally promulgated in December, 1836. Now would begin the Centralist Republic of Mexico, a decade of conservative and centralist rule, whose first president was expected to be Santa Anna.

== Government ==
The Constitution of 1824 began by declaring the absolute independence of the country, confirming the Roman Catholic religion as the only one permitted in the nation, and formally establishing the states that were to make up the republic Government was then divided into the three separate legislative, executive, and judicial branches.

The legislative branch was to be made up of a two chambered congress: a popularly elected chamber of deputies with the seats each state had dependent on its population, and a senate elected by the state legislatures, with each state represented by two senators. Certain state, federal, military, and church officials were forbidden from simultaneously holding their offices and running for congress.

The executive power was vested in a president that was to be elected by the state legislatures, which were supposed to each nominate two individuals for the presidency, one of whom must not reside in their state.

The judicial branch was vested in a supreme court composed of eleven judges and an attorney general, elected by the state legislatures in the same fashion as they were to elect the president.

State governments were to be modeled on the federal government, practicing the same separation of powers.

The Constitution of 1824 showed clear influence from the Constitution of the United States and hence was subsequently criticized for being maladapted to Mexican circumstances. However, in contrast to the U.S. Constitution, the Constitution of 1824 did not guarantee freedom of religion nor trial by jury.

== Education ==
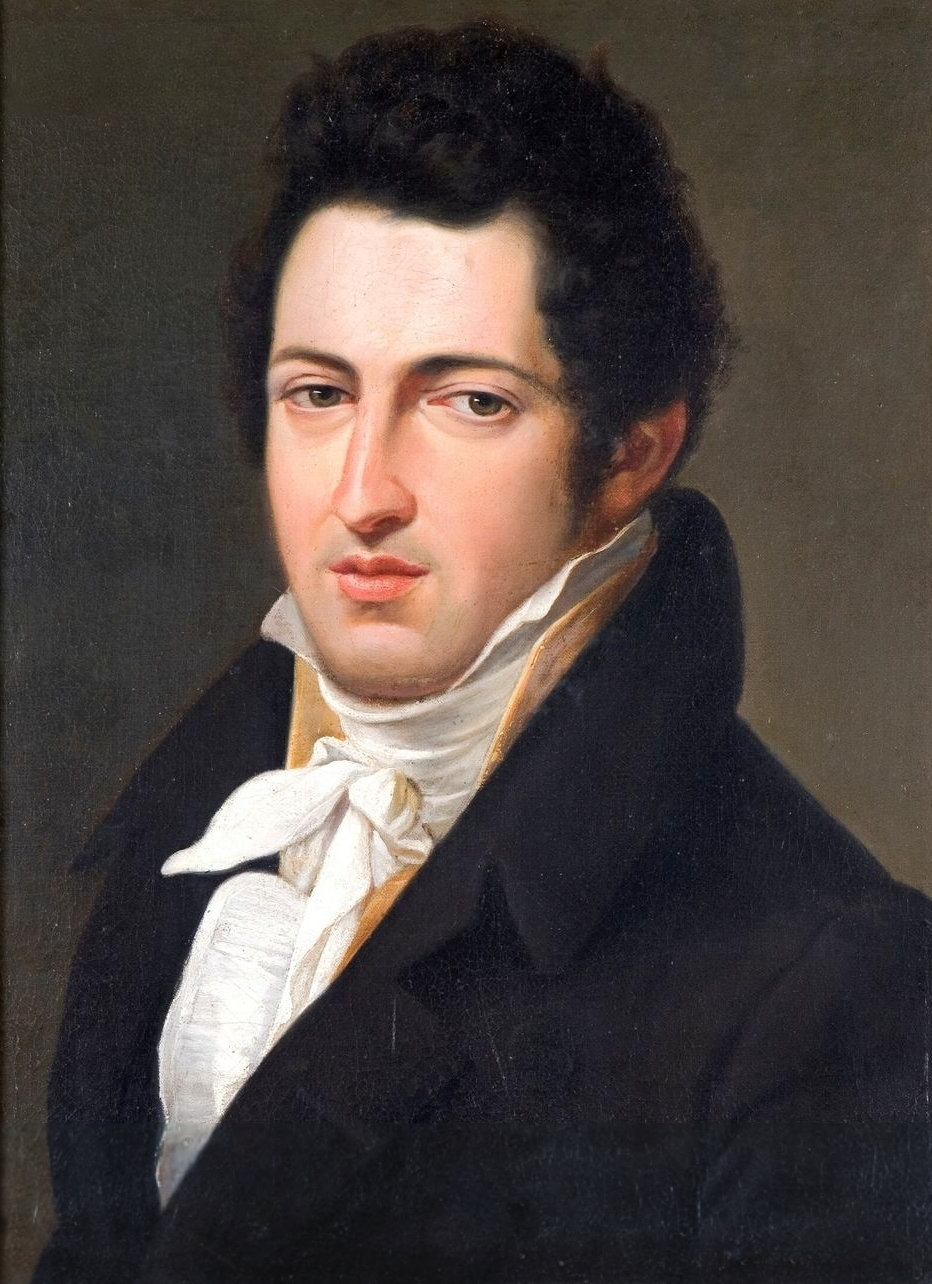
Lucas Alamán, leading minister during the First Republic who also placed an emphasis on developing the young republic's educational system

Throughout the First Republic, jurisdiction over education tended to move around the ministries of the Mexican government, which themselves were in the process of often being reorganized. At one point education fell under the Ministry of Inner and Outer Relations, and at another time under Justice and Ecclesiastical Affairs, and later under a newly formed Ministry of Justice.

A Lancasterian Society had been founded in 1822 by the editors of the Mexican Paper El Sol to teach at an institution going by the same name, and several Mexican states founded analogous institutions.

In 1823 Minister of Relations, Alaman wrote a report establishing that the basis of national education was to be primary instruction, and argued that without education there could be no liberty. He published a plan for the Mexican educational system to embrace all sciences, and to assimilate the educational systems that had existed under Spanish Colonial administration.

The Constitution of 1824 established a responsibility for municipal authorities to provide primary instruction. State governments such as Chihuahua, Oaxaca, and Zacatecas also took steps to establish institutes of secondary education during this time.

Throughout the era of the First Republic, the institutions of the Lancasterian Society struggled to make ends meet through private contributions and had to increasingly rely on government support. By 1831, Minister Lucas Alamán noted in a report to congress that the Society had been forced to close one of its branches over a lack of contributions.

In 1832, Minister Alaman sought to organize higher education in the nation by decreeing that theology was to be taught at the Conciliar Seminary, the College of San Ildefonso was to teach law and classical literature, the College of Mines was to teach physical sciences, and the College of San Juan de Letran was to teach medicine, also assimilating the faculty of the National College of Surgery. Mexican archaeology was to be taught at the newly established Botanical Garden.

The Gomez Farias administration also added faculties to Mexico's existing schools of higher education. To the school of the Hospital de Jesús Nazareno were added faculties on eight languages, philosophy, and natural theology. To the School of Mines were added schools of Physical and Natural Sciences, Mathematics, Cosmography, Physics, Chemistry, Natural History, Geology, Geography, and Mineralogy.

In October 1833, a directory general of public instruction was established, headed by Gomez Farias himself, and charged with responsibilities such as planning textbooks, inspecting public libraries, and fostering public instructions through the use of theaters.

== Science ==
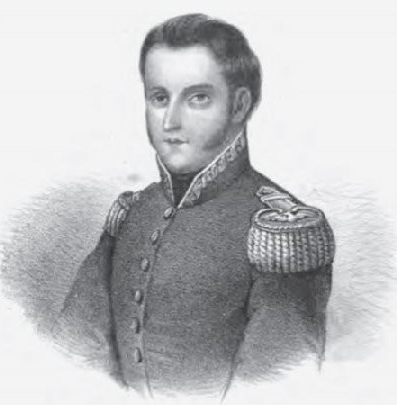
Manuel de Mier y Terán, who led a scientific expedition to Texas lasting from 1827 to 1831.

In April 1833, president Valentín Gómez Farías founded a National Institute of Geography and Statistics. A national museum was established in 1825 and reorganized in 1831 with a library on natural history, archaeology and history. A law was also passed in 1829 forbidding the exportation of Mexican antiquities.

The botanist Juan José Martínez de Lexarza collaborated with the priest and naturalist Pablo de La Llave from 1824 to 1825 in classifying and cataloging various species of Mexican plants, their work being published as Novorum Vegetabilium descriptiones.

In 1827, the Mexican government sent a scientific expedition to study and survey the border of Texas. The expedition was led by Manuel de Mier y Terán and among its scientific staff were Rafael Chovell and the Swiss naturalist Jean-Louis Berlandier. The latter two would collaborate through the following four years on a journal which included mineralogical, botanical, and zoological observations. A collection of samples was also gathered that contained more than two thousand plants.

== Literature ==
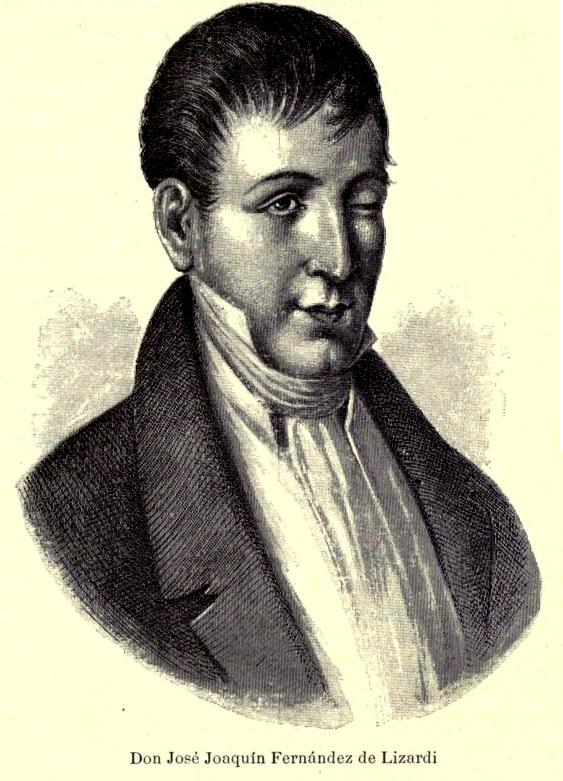
José Joaquín Fernández de Lizardi

The journalist, playwright, and pioneering Mexican novelist José Joaquín Fernández de Lizardi spent the final years of his career and life during the period of the First Republic. He published Conversaciones entre el Payo y el Sacristán (The Conversations of the Churl and the Sacristan) in 1824, and in 1826 founded his last newspaper the Correo Semanario de Mexico (Weekly Mail from Mexico) before dying in 1827.

The Mexican dramatist Don Fernando Calderón y Beltrán, began his career during the First Republic with a steady output of plays in the theaters of Guadalajara and Zacatecas between 1827 and 1836.

The literary output of the Liberal historian and statesman Lorenzo de Zavala is entirely confined to this period. He published a detailed history of Mexico from the time of the War of Independence up until the first administration of Anastasio Bustamante. He also published a series of travelogues about Belgium, Holland, Switzerland, and the United States from his time in exile and as a Mexican ambassador.

The Liberal statesman, historian, and political theorist José María Luis Mora began his first period of literary output during this period laying out the ideological foundations of the Liberal Party and of president Valentín Gómez Farías’ first administration through his Political Catechism of the Mexican Federation and the Dissertation on the Nature and Use of Ecclesiastical Income and Wealth, the latter laying out the case of nationalization of Catholic Church properties.

=== Periodicals ===
The Yorkino Rite of Freemasonry, an element of the nascent Liberal Party, published multiple newspapers during this time, notable among them being El Aguila Mexicana (The Mexican Eagle), El Amigo del Pueblo (The People's Friend) and Correo de la Federacion (The Federal Mail), the latter of which served as a mouthpiece for Lorenzo de Zavala. The Escocés Rite of Freemasonry, an element of the nascent Conservative Party, notably published El Observador (The Observer) among its staff was Francisco Manuel Sánchez de Tagle.

In 1825, the Cuban poet and expatriate José María Heredia y Heredia along with the liberal Italian illustrator Claudio Linati founded El Iris, a Yorkino Liberal aligned Mexico City magazine furnished by "excellent lithographs of fashions, water-color pictures, pages of music from pieces then in vogue, [and] caricatures..."

The government published an official paper known as El Gladiador (The Gladiator), who engaged in feuds with the opposition papers El Atleta (The Athlete), and El Federalista (The Federalist), the latter emerging as the voice of opposition as the autocratic administration of Anastasio Bustamante sought to increasingly restrict the press. Its chief contributor was Andrés Quintana Roo.

== Economics ==
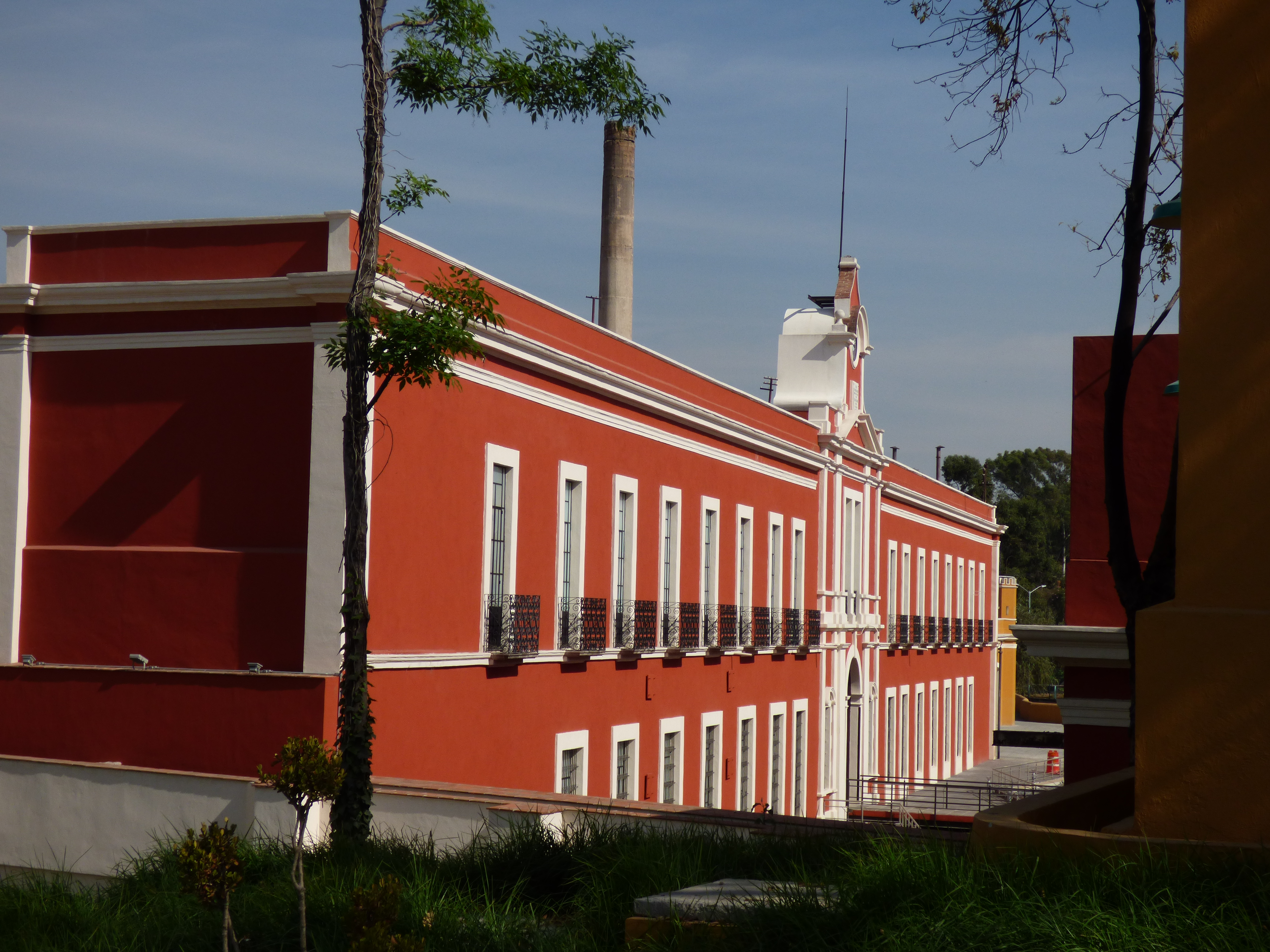
Building of La Constancia Mexicana: a textile factory that was built in 1835.

=== Finances ===
The First Mexican Republic found itself inheriting a bankrupt treasury and was forced to mortgage public property to raise funds. Corruption among financial officers also moved congress to entirely reorganize the governments revenue departments.

In November 1824, congress dissolved the old revenue department and organized a new more thorough one led by the newly established office of the treasury general of the federation. Separate local auditing offices for different branches of the military were abolished and replaced with a more centrally organized system, and an office was established for keeping track of military financial data. All offices connected with revenue had to keep track of financial accounts and send copies to the treasury general. There some impact on corruption, but the government still struggled to meet its obligations.

In 1830, a Banco de Avío was founded by Lucas Alamán, with a capital of one million dollars, aimed at granting loans and machinery to manufacturers and agriculturists. This was the first formal banking establishment in Mexican history. The experiment had limited success, mainly in the field of textiles, which nonetheless laid the foundation of a nascent Mexican industry.

=== Trade ===
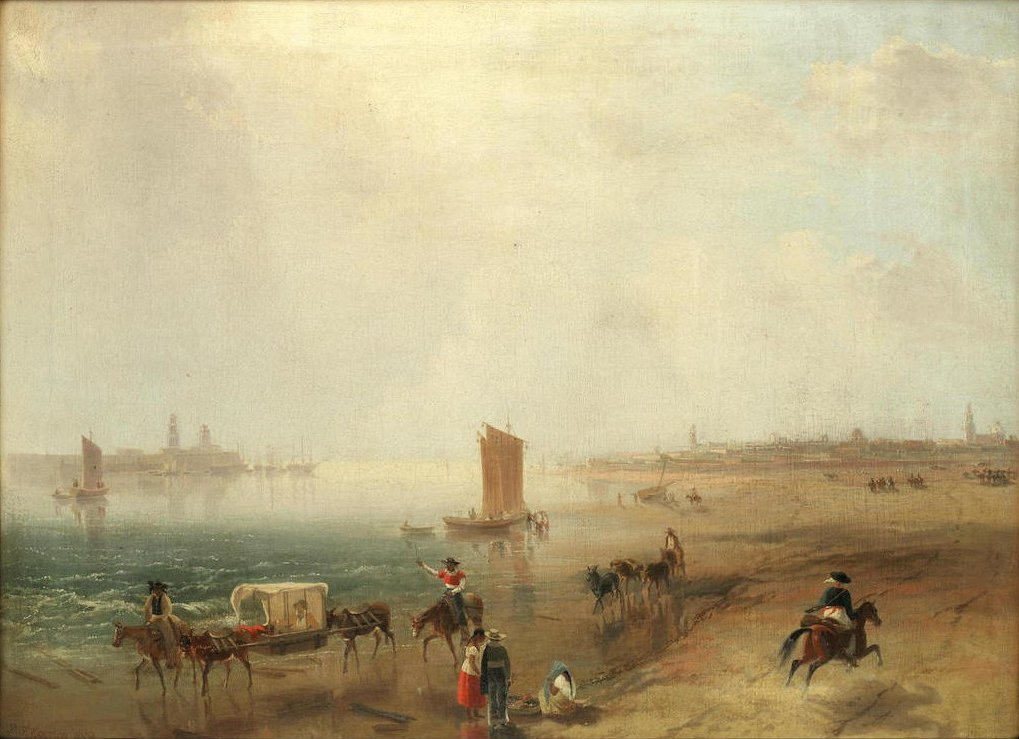
1830 painting with the Port of Veracruz in the distance.

A tariff law of 1827 forbade the importation of raw cotton and common yarn. Minister Lucas Alamán also aimed to prevent exportation of gold and silver.

Measures were passed to develop a Mexican mercantile marine. Foreign vessels were permitted to transport goods between Mexican ports only when there was no Mexican vessel available. Mexican citizens were allowed to purchase foreign built ships, but the officers and two thirds of the crew had to be Mexican citizens, and no vessel flying the Mexican flag was allowed to be owned by a foreigner.

An 1825 measure established guard posts along the Mexican border to prevent smuggling.

=== Infrastructure ===
In 1827, a board of public highways was established for the purpose of improving the roads.

A railroad from Veracruz to Mexico City began to be planned during this time, but construction would not begin until the era of the Centralist Republic.

=== Agriculture ===
The First Mexican Republic also abolished the state monopoly on the cultivation and sale of tobacco leading to a proliferation of the crop for the domestic market. Taxes were also lifted on olive and grape production leading to an increase in their cultivation.

=== Manufacturing ===
The government sought to develop a paper manufacturing industry by decreeing that only Mexican made paper should be used for official business. To foster the rise of Mexican industry relevant technical schools were founded.

== Conflicts with Indigenous peoples in Northern Mexico ==
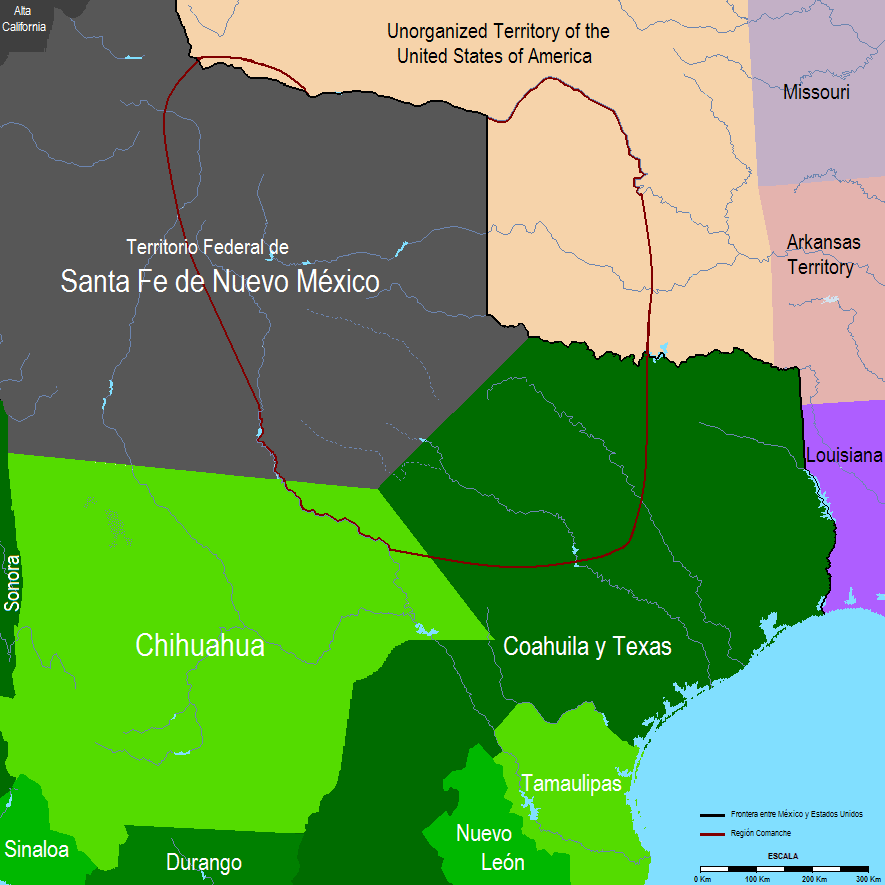
The 1832 boundaries of Comancheria, the Comanche homeland

In Alta California during the late colonial era the Franciscans had established missions from San Diego in the south to the San Franciscan bay area in the north. In 1824, indigenous in four central coast missions revolted against ill-treatment by non-indigenous authorities. The Chumash revolt was suppressed, the mission indigenous pardoned and urged to return to the missions, but the revolt was serious and challenged the narrative of peaceful mission indigenous.

The republic would largely adopt Spanish colonial policy with regard to the Apache, establecimiento, or the system by which the Spanish sought to settle the Apache and make them sedentary by offering these Apaches de Paz (Peaceful Apaches) goods and land in exchange for peace and abandonment of nomadic lifestyle. The Mexican state followed the practice of its Spanish colonial predecessor, with inadequate military resources to suppress the northern indigenous groups that did not recognize outsiders sovereignty over their territory. Mexico faced an insufficient defense network against the Comanches and Apaches in the Northern States. Even going so far as to include a royal signature, pre-Republican Mexico reinstated Spanish Indian policies to the letter. While some peace treaties did exist between locals and los indios, the peace did not last long, as Apaches would often simply take their violence elsewhere when villages proved to be too difficult to raid. With these ineffective policies in place, combined with an ever-evolving and adapting Comanche Empire, the Early Republic faced a formidable foe with an inadequate infrastructure. The lack of appropriate defense against raids might not have been so large of a problem for the Republic, if establicimiento had not all but been forgone by the 1830s, with post-independence 1820s economic instability causing many regions to drastically reduce rations to the Apaches de Paz.

The Apache were supplied with guns by US American merchants. Goods including guns and shoes were sold to the Apache, the latter being discovered by Mexican forces when they found traditional Apache trails with American shoe prints instead of moccasin prints. The cycle of heightened violence between Mexicans and Apaches further destabilized the Republic, with bloody and violent suppression of Apaches. Discontent among the northern Mexican states reached a peak in 1837, when the governor of the Sonora declared that "the United States has already as much as declared a state of war between our two nations" with regard to both the annexation of Texas and the illegal entering and selling of weapons committed by United States' citizens.
