= Black Eagle (disambiguation) =

Black eagle (Ictinaetus malayensis) is a bird of prey.

Black Eagle may also refer to:

- Verreaux's eagle (Aquila verreauxii), an African bird of prey

== Arts and entertainment ==
- The Black Eagle, a 1946 Italian adventure film
- Black Eagle (1948 film), a Western film
- Black Eagle (1988 film), an American action film
- R2B: Return to Base, also known as Black Eagle, a 2012 South Korean film
- Black Eagle, a fictional character in Davy Crockett and the River Pirates (1956)
- "Black Eagle", a song by Janet Jackson from the 2015 album Unbreakable
- Black Eagles, a 1970s reggae band featuring Denroy Morgan
- The Black Eagles (Irish band) a band based in Dublin, Ireland.
- "The Black Eagle", a sketch from Monty Python's Flying Circus
- The Black Eagles, a faction from the tactical role-playing video game Fire Emblem: Three Houses

== Military ==
- Black Eagle (tank), a Russian prototype
- Black Eagles aerobatic team, of the Republic of Korea Air Force
- Chengdu J-20 Black Eagle, a Chinese fighter aircraft
- Operation Black Eagle, a military operation in Iraq in 2007
- Order of the Black Eagle, the highest order of chivalry in Prussia
- The Black Eagles, a series of Colombian drug trafficking paramilitary organizations
- Black Eagles (Kosovo Liberation Army unit), a unit during the Kosovo War

== People ==
- Black Eagle (lacrosse) (fl. 1904), a Native American lacrosse player
- Chief Black Eagle, alias of Dwight York (born 1945), Nuwaubian leader and convicted criminal
- Wahweveh (Black Eagle) (died 1879), a leader of the Oregon Walpapi Paiute
- Hubert Julian (1897–1983), Trinidadian aviator known as the Black Eagle

== Places ==
- Black Eagle, Montana, U.S.
- Black Eagle, West Virginia, U.S.
- Black Eagle Dam, on the Missouri River, Montana, U.S.

== Sport ==
- Black Eagles, nickname of the German national Australian rules football team
- Black Eagles, nickname of Beşiktaş J.K., a Turkish football club

== Other uses ==
- Black Eagle (Montreal), a Canadian gay bar
- Black Eagle (Russia), a former high security penal colony in Russia
- Black Eagle Brewery, in London, England
- Black Eagle Silver Certificate Large-size $US1 United States currency
- Black Eagle Party, a Mexican masonic lodge
- HMS Black Eagle, a ship
- Arrano beltza (Basque, 'black eagle'), a Navarre and Basque nationalist symbol

== See also ==
- Order of the Black Eagle (disambiguation)
- Eagle (heraldry)
- Double-headed eagle
- Treaty of the Three Black Eagles
- Pitchfork uprising, also known as Black Eagle Uprising, 1920
