= Black Eagle Party =

Gran Legión del Águila Negra (GLAN) Party

The Black Eagle Party, also known as the Great Legion of the Black Eagle (Spanish: Gran Legión del Águila Negra (GLAN)), was a Mexican pro-independence Masonic lodge opposing the Spaniards and the intervention of the Catholic Church in society. The party was established on May 30, 1823, by Guadalupe Victoria and Simón de Chávez in Puente del Rey, Veracruz, Mexico (now Puente Nacional). The organization's main goal was facilitating the freedom of the Americas. The organization was considered to be the first political party founded in independent Mexico before later merging into the Liberal Party.

== Great Legion of the Black Eagle in Mexico ==
When the Great Legion of the Black Eagle was created, Guadalupe Victoria was the commanding general of Jalapa (now known as Xalpa). With the failure of Agustin de Iturbide's empire, Mexico faced the challenge of establishing itself from zero since Congress had annulled the Treaty of Córdoba and the Plan of Iguala, which, as a consequence, allowed the country to lean towards a form of government of their preference. However, a republic was becoming clear as the system of government that was going to be established, although it had not yet been decided if it was going to be central or federal. Meanwhile, there was also intense pressure for autonomy from the provinces. In addition to these problems, there were different positions on how or if the church should intervene in society. A republican constitution was eventually established as the main governing system in 1824.

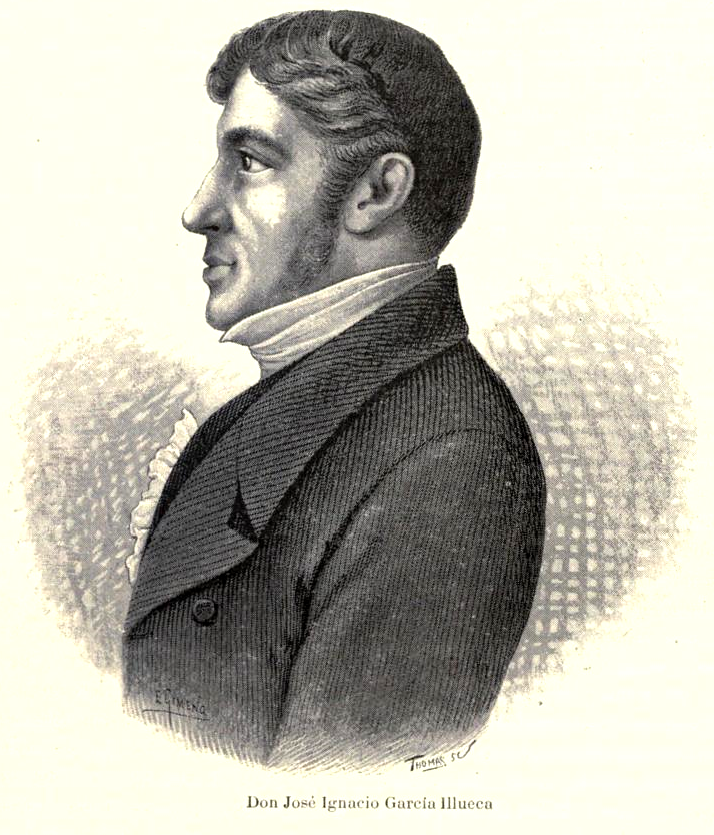
José Ignacio García Illueca

It is known that the struggle for independence had religious aspects for both the insurgents and the colonial army, but once the first Mexican empire was established, the role of the church was rigorously questioned. This uncertainty only grew with the rise of freemasonry from 1821 to 1823. At the end of the struggle for independence, freemasonry based on the Scottish Rite had already been established in Mexico. Led by Felipe Martínez de Aragón and Fausto Elhuyar, it had been joined by men who served Juan O'Donojú, such as Manuel Codorniú; deputies who were back from Cádiz, such as Miguel Ramos Arizpe, Mariano Michelena and Lorenzo de Zavala; and Mexicans of the elite like José María Fagoaga, José Ignacio García Illueca, and Tomas Murphy.

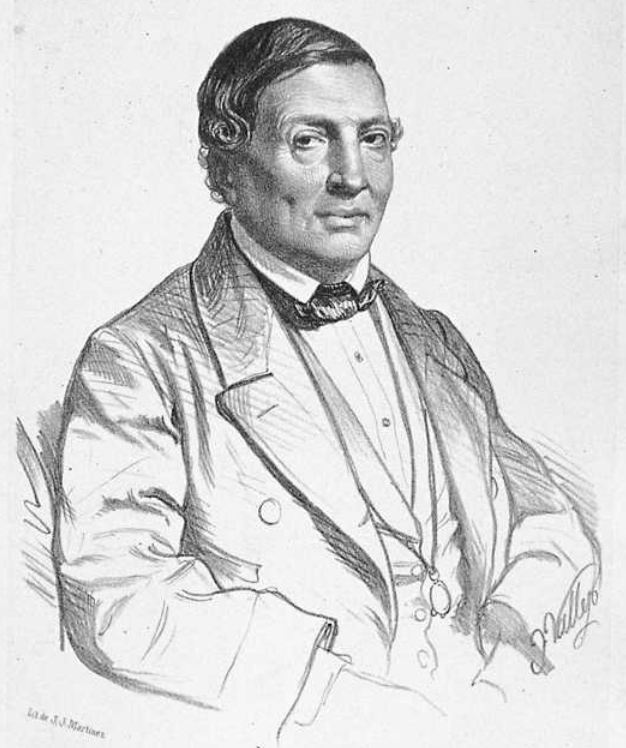
Manuel Codorniu

It is said that Scottish Freemasonry played a very important role in the fall of the empire of Iturbide. The Scots were mostly followers of the constitutional monarchy and Bourbonists. The foundation of The Great Legion of the Black Eagle had two objectives: generating support for the independence of Cuba and the desire of Guadalupe Victoria to create a political party that would favor him and neutralize the political impulse and power of The Scottish Rite members. Concerning Cuban independence, it is evident that the Great Black Eagle Legion intended to favor it or even achieve the annexation of Cuba by Mexico. The Black Eagle Party claimed to work against despotism and in favor of freedom.

In 1823, the GLAN indicated that its object was to completely remove the yoke of slavery which the Spanish had been using for 300 years.

At this time, the supporters of several political projects that included republicans, federalists, centralists, those who supported a constitutional monarchy, representatives of several ecclesiastical sectors, and those who exhibited a moldable position were considered liberals. For the Great Legion of the Black Eagle, however, the true liberals were the republicans – those who they recognized as proponents of freedom, independence from Spain, equality, and patriotism. Guadalupe Victoria proposed to constitute a government headed by an insurgent and that he was also the only insurgent who differed by rejecting the Iguala Plan so as not to abandon his independence plan, for which he proclaimed himself a republican. Therefore, membership of the Great Black Eagle Legion entailed support for Guadalupe Victoria's presidency and political plans.

The antipathy of the Great Legion of the Black Eagle for religion was radical compared to other political sectors, like the Yorkinos. According to the documents of the Great Black Eagle Legion, they were not opposed to religion, but as time passed their opinions hardened as they upheld the rule of preventing Clerics and Friars from entering the association as being of the utmost importance because they saw them as being harmful to society for growing their religious fanaticism, making people live in brutality. For the Great Legion of the Black Eagle, it was not only a matter of fighting against religious fanaticism, but they also wanted to banish faith entirely. This meant that they were going against something which up until this point was considered fundamental to unity and social order, because in the constitution of 1824 the Catholic religion was established as the only religion in the entirety of the nation.

In the statutes of the Great Legion of the Black Eagle, they declared themselves to be distinct to other associations of the Masonic, commoner and coalman; and they were the opposite of a Masonic society because they did not ask for quotas or oaths, their degrees did not agree with those of any other Masonic rite, they did not meet constantly and there were no relations of brotherhood between them. But in the "instructions to the deputies of the states," it showed in some way that the Great Legion of the Black Eagle had merged with the York Rite.

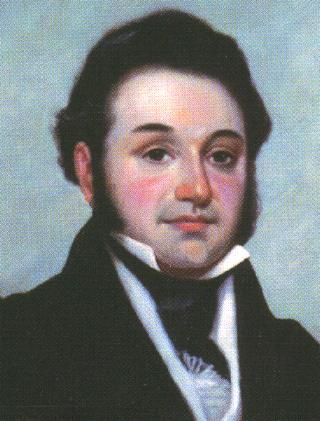
Lorenzo de Zavala.

In March 1823, Guadalupe Victoria was appointed a member of the provisional Executive Power. On June 8, 1824, the members of the Great Legion of the Black Eagle met in Jalapa, the current capital of Veracruz, to make agreements before the departure of Guadalupe Victoria to Mexico City, who on October 1, 1824, became president-elect of the Mexican Republic. Abandoning thus the Great Legion of the Black Eagle. Once promoted to power, it took a lot of momentum with a performance almost equal to that of Freemasonry of the York Rite.

Once in power, Guadalupe Victoria maintained his plan to promote the independence of Cuba. At this time, he presented a new plan for a military expedition to the Congress of his country, which was accepted by the Senate after many discussions.

(...) 1. The Government is authorized to undertake a military expedition with the Republic of Colombia to support the efforts of the inhabitants of Cuba in the consummation of their independence. 2. In the event that the cause of freedom triumphs in Cuba, the Government is obliged to seek by all means to establish in it the national representation with the same bases and rights of the people as in the new American Republics.

For Guadalupe Victoria, this alliance gave the green light for Antonio López de Santa Anna to make the expedition that he had prepared in Yucatán. However, this did not go ahead due to other international events that affected the Latin American environment. Among these problems was that the United States still considered Cuba and Puerto Rico within its commercial interests and as good options for its territorial expansion. Before the expedition was unable to be done, the alliance between Colombia and Mexico was consolidated on March 17, 1826. These countries signed a treaty that regulated their collaboration to fight against Spain, both in the Antilles and on the coasts of the continent. This agreement was called the Operations plan for the combined squad of Mexico and Colombia. In this Mexican-Colombian project members of the Great Black Eagle Legion were involved.

The separation of the conspiracy of the Great Legion of the Black Eagle occurred at the same time as the transformations occurred in European politics that discouraged the Spanish plans for the reconquest of America. The independence of the Hispanic countries and Mexico along with the loss of commercial exchange between Havana and Veracruz due to an 1826 treaty with Cuba caused the abandonment of efforts to free Cuba.

== The Great Legion of the Black Eagle in Cuba ==
Through the action of Simón de Chávez and other Cubans, the Great Legion of the Black Eagle spread from Mexico to Cuba with ease. In 1826, the musician José Rubio traveled to Havana, the capital city of Cuba, carrying a copy of the tenets of the Black Eagle, which were then handed over to Manuel Rojo to establish the Legion in Cuba. These statutes had to be adapted because of the different radicalism in Mexico compared to Cuba, but they retained their purpose. Once the Great Legion of the Black Eagle was founded in Cuba, it had the full support of Mexico and Colombia. This continued until the Spanish authorities in Havana discovered the Legion's existence in 1829.

The Great Legion of the Black Eagle in Cuba aimed to obtain supporters for Cuban independence and sought to change the national government with the support of Mexico.

On December 23, 1829, the Spanish minister in Philadelphia reached out to the government of La Habana to inform them that Mr. José Solís was in contact with and member of a society called San Juanista. This society was governed under the same customs as those with the name of Sol de Bolívar. Solís was born in New Orleans and moved to Havana.

On January 25, 1830, the president of the Military Commission, José Cadaval, appointed Captain Tomas de Salazar as prosecutor for the investigation of the case. Captain de Salazar quickly began his investigation and discovered that there was a father and son with the name José Solís and that both of them had bad reputations. A preliminary investigation of the two produced no significant results. On February 8 of that same year, Captain de Salazar was ordered to apprehend both Solis Sr. and Jr. Their respective homes were investigated. The father was cleared of suspicion, but the son was found to be in possession of suspicious documents. Among the documents of José Solís Jr. were personal letters, a Masonic diploma in his name, encrypted documents, and documents of the Masonic type. Solís Jr. was determined to be a great danger to the public and was accused of conspiring to disturb public order.

The Great Legion of the Black Eagle was looking for the independence of Cuba

Solís gave his first statement on February 12, 1830. Solís explained that Lucas Ugarte, Secretary of the Patriotic Society, had asked him to be a Mason. Solís found out through Ugarte that this Masonic society had been transformed into the Great Legion of the Black Eagle. One of the letters that José Solís had in his possession was addressed to Mateo Somellan and sent by Manuel Ronquillo from New Orleans. In this letter, he reported that the people whose assistance was needed for matters of Independence had not confirmed their participation due to lack of money. José Solís also stated that he had learned from conversations that Manuel Abreu had weapons to use at any time for the benefit of independence. He was only waiting on news that was expected from Veracruz, Mexico. Once the crimes of freemasonry and conspiracy for independence were announced, the prosecutor Tomás de Salazar questioned Solís again, to discover who was the leader of The great legion of the Black Eagle. On February 24, 1830, José Solís, after being held incommunicado in the Bethlehem Barracks, on February 19, 1830, declared that he did not know how many people were introduced in The Black Legion's Great Legion and did not know the time when he began. Solis was aware that the first establishment of this society was in Mexico, where it had extended to Cuba.

On the night of the 26th and the morning of the 27th, Lucas Ugarte, Diego Araoz, Felix Rodriguez Hermida, Gabriel Peláez, Manuel Abreu, José Rodríguez, Gabino Hernández, Juan Saldaña, Marcos Fernández Castañeda, Gaspar Acosta, Miguel Vázquez, José González Ávila, José Encalada, Francisco Pacheco, Manuel Rojo, Pedro Pablo Peláez, Francisco Cordero and Rafael Gatica were among those who were captured. Pedro Muros could not be apprehended due to being in New Orleans, and Juan Nepomuceno Escobedo became at large in the countryside.

It was never known exactly who was the leader of the Great Legion of the Black Eagle in Cuba, although there were suspicions that it was Manuel Rojo, one of the most prestigious lawyers in Havana.

== See also ==
- History of Mexico
- First Mexican Empire
- First Mexican Republic

== Bibliography in Spanish ==
- Del Valle, Adrian. (1930) Historia Documentada de la Conspiración de la Gran Legión del Águila Negra. La Habana, Editorial El Siglo.
- Guerra, Sergio. (1998). México y Cuba: primeros esfuerzos por la independencia cubana, 1820–1830. Instituto de Investigaciones Histórico- Sociales. Universidad Veracruzana.
- Vázquez, María Eugenia. (2007). "La Gran Legión del Águila Negra. Documentos sobre su fundación, estatutos y objetivos." Revista Relaciones, vol.XXVIII (111), 143–166.
- López Silva, Blanca Elizabeth (2015) "México en la Historia 1" Intervenciones Extranjeras,"BOSCO IMPRESIONES" Editorial Éxodo, pag 170–190
- Soucy Dominique (2004), La ´´gran legión del águila negra`` un águila de dos cabezas. (México – Cuba, 1823 – 1830). En torno a las Antillas hispánicas: ensayos en homenaje al profesor Paul Estrade, 2004, págs. 242–256.
