= Claudio Linati =

Italian artist (1790–1832)

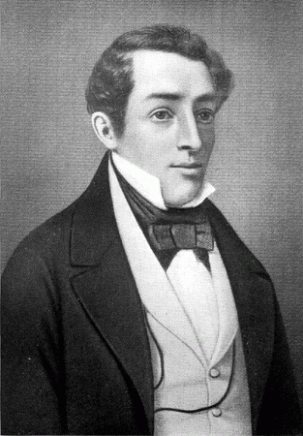
- Born: 1 February 1790; Carbonera, Duchy of Parma
- Died: 11 December 1832 (aged 42); Tampico, Tamaulipas, Mexico
- Occupations: Painter, lithographer
- Known for: Civil, Military and Religious Costumes of Mexico (1828)

Claudio Linati (1 February 1790 – 11 December 1832) was an Italian painter and lithographer who studied under Jacques-Louis David in Paris and established the first lithographic press in Mexico. He co-founded and edited El Iris, a periodical that published the first political cartoons in Mexico, and was forced to leave the country for his political activism. Linati was also involved in revolutionary causes in Italy and Spain. He is known for his hand-colored book illustrating costumes of different types of people in Mexico.

== Early years ==
Marcos Claudio Marcelo Antonio Pompeyo Blas Juan Linati y Prevost was born into a noble family in Carbonera de Parma, in the Duchy of Parma, on 1 February 1790, just after the start of the French Revolution. His father, count Filippo Linati, was active in the politics of his time. Claudio Linati was educated by the jurist Giuseppe Caderini. At the age of seventeen Claudio Linati joined the Society of Engravers of Parma, designing and engraving the portrait of the famous artist-priest Andrea Amoretti, co-worker of Giambattista Bodoni.

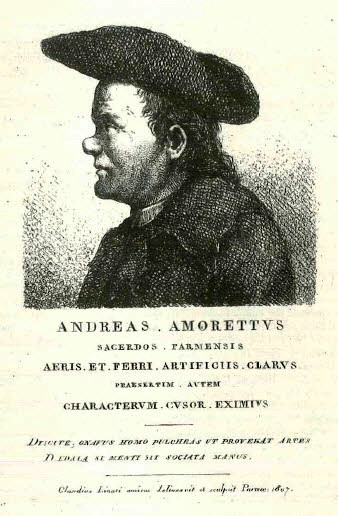
Portrait of the priest Andrea Amoretti, the first known piece of work of Claudio Linati

He studied lithography, a recently invented technique for printing images. In 1809 he went to Paris, where he studied painting in the studio of Jacques-Louis David. Linati also studied in the Paris studio of fellow-Italian Gioacchino Giuseppe Serangeli.

Count Linati became an officer in the Napoleonic army. In 1810 he was imprisoned in Hungary. After his release he moved to Spain. In 1818 he returned to Parma, where he founded the Secret Society of the Sublime Perfect Master, with the goal of resisting tyranny. In 1821 Linati was in Barcelona, leading the Migueletes militia. He came to own considerable property in Catalonia. In 1823 he was taken prisoner in La Seu d'Urgell and sent as a prisoner to Mont-Louis in France. In October 1823 he was in Avignon, and soon after was in Brussels. On 9 April 1824 Linati was tried in absentia and sentenced to death by the Supreme Court of Parma for conspiracy against the government.

== Mexico ==
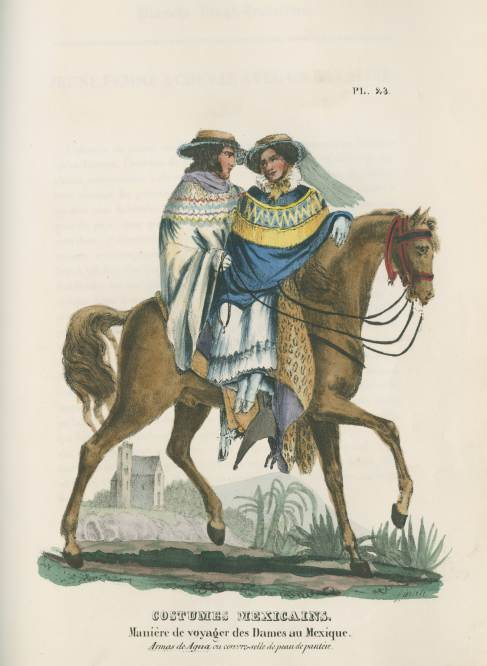
Maniere de voyager des Dames au Mexique (How Women Travel in Mexico; 1828)

Linati was commissioned to survey the coast of Mexico and find an anchorage for the ships and machines of mining companies. He arrived at Alvarado, Veracruz, Mexico on 6 March 1825. This was the year in which the last Spanish stronghold in San Juan de Ulúa surrendered. On 22 September 1825 Linati moved to Veracruz to study lithography. In 1826 he moved to Mexico City, where the government assisted him in opening a lithography workshop. He and Gaspar Franchini installed the first lithography machine to arrive in Mexico in February 1826. Franchini died while the machine was being installed.

Linati also set up a school, with pupils who included José Gracida and Ignacio Serrano. The small workshop included two presses and a collection of prints by French artists for use as examples by the students. Not long after arriving Linati made a lithograph of a map of Texas by Fiorenzo Galli. A copy of this map, the only one known to have survived, is held by the Center for American History at the University of Texas at Austin.

Linati had come to Mexico to observe a newly independent country and to "civilize" and politicize its people. He was one of the editors of the weekly El Iris (February–August 1826). His partners in this enterprise were Fiorenzo Galli and the Cuban poet José María Heredia. The literary periodical included lithographs depicting antiquities and modern fashions. It also provided diverse cultural content, and portraits of Guadalupe Victoria, José María Morelos and Miguel Hidalgo y Costilla, heroes of the independence struggle.

El Iris also included editorial content that sparked controversy. Linati was sure there would be another attempt by Spain to conquer Mexico. He and Galli became involved in the disputes between Yorkinos and Escoceses, rival groups of Freemasons. Linati took the Yorkino position that the people were sovereign, and only federalism could protect individuals and the nation against the depredations of the army and the priests. He was opposed to strong central authority and in favor of greater education in citizenship and the discipline of military service.

The paper published the first Mexican political cartoon, La Tiranía (Tyranny), which was attributed to Linati. El Iris demanded freedom of the press throughout Mexico. Only forty issues were printed. The political comments caused the closure of the paper and forced Linati to leave the country in 1826. (Note: Linati abandoned his lithographic press when he left Mexico. It was used by Jean-Frédéric Waldeck to print his Colección de las Antigüedades Mexicanas, and by the start of 1830 hed been acquired by the Academy of San Carlos.) Although short-lived, El Iris established a lasting model for journals that printed satirical lithographs on political and social subjects.

== Later years ==
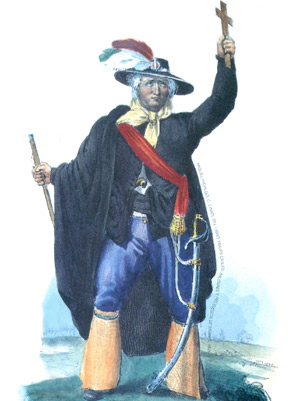
Miguel Hidalgo y Costilla (1828)

Linati was given a passport to return to Europe on 27 September 1826. In December 1826 he embarked on the Conveyance in Veracruz, sailing to New York City, where he stayed until 15 January 1827. He then embarked on the American ship Dawn for Antwerp, which he reached on 15 March 1827. He went on to Brussels and began work on an illustrated book about Mexico. His book of Mexican civil, military and religious costumes, with text and illustrations, was published in Belgium in 1828 and in London in 1830.

On 20 August 1829 a passport was sent to Linati to return Mexico via Le Havre and the United States, but was not used immediately. It was issued by senor Gorostiza, the confidential agent of the Republic of Mexico in Brussels. In 1830 Linati was one of the members of the Paris-based Giunta Liberatrice Italian. He was involved in the unsuccessful attempts at Italian unification in 1830–31. Linati decided to return to Mexico. He arrived in Tampico, Tamaulipas, Mexico, and three days later died from yellow fever on 11 December 1832.

Claudio Linati is remembered for his liberal revolutionary ideals and his artistic and historical legacy. Sir Anthony Panizzi, who knew him well, called him a man of turbulent spirit with a hardy constitution, full of energy but with no set purpose, well-read, a painter, poet and playwright. He was always interested in the manners and customs of the countries he visited. He hated England and the English, called the French servile cattle for their submission to tyranny, and said Spain was in a condition of priestly anarchy. There is a plaque on 45 Borgo Felino St, Parma, Italy, that reads:

"Filippo and Claudio Linati owned and lived in this house. The first was indicted as Chief of the Provisional Insurrectional Government in 1831, and the second was sentenced to death for having conspired in 1821 to redeem Italy from domestic and foreign servitude.

== Civil, Military and Religious Costumes of Mexico ==
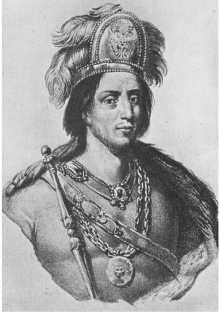
Moctezuma II from the 1828 book on Costumes of Mexico

Linati is renowned for his 1828 Civil, Military and Religious Costumes of Mexico (French: Costumes civils, militaires et réligieux du Mexique, Spanish: Trajes civiles, religiosos y militares de México). This is the first inventory of types of Mexican people made by a foreigner. It is also one of the first color plate books about Mexico to be printed, with forty-eight hand-colored lithographs. The book depicts the great variety of Mexican society of the time, setting a model that would be followed by later illustrators such as Carl Nebel. The book was translated into Spanish and published in Mexico in 1956, with a foreword by Manuel Toussaint.

The first plate in the book depicts Moctezuma II, a symbol of the Mexico that existed before the Europeans arrived. Linati represents Moctezuma as a strong and dignified ruler holding his scepter as a symbol of power. Linati disputes the view that the Aztecs were barbarous, asserting that human progress and civilization is universal. He compares the cruelty of the Aztec priests to the cruelty of the Roman Catholic Inquisition, both examples of the evils of superstition. Linati praises the ethnic diversity of Mexico, but writes that the indigenous people must abandon their languages and some of their customs. They must learn in schools from the Creole elite and serve in the army to become full citizens.

The book shows the wealth and dignity of landowners. Linati praises the role the Creoles played in the revolution, but also makes much of Italian volunteers such as Count Giuseppe Stavoli and General Vicente Filisola who had helped in the fight for freedom, and who are depicted in several illustrations. He shows various types of soldier and praises the fighters in the insurgent movement that had recently won Mexico her independence. He also depicts the liberal heroes José María Morelos and Guadalupe Victoria. The book includes a portrait of General Vicente Filisola. In 1836 this general would be second in command to General Antonio López de Santa Anna on his expedition to Texas.

The book represents Mexican men and women of all stations of life. The brief essays that accompany each picture describe the costume and comment on aspects of the character depicted, often critically. Linati mocks a young female worker in a pink dress with a shawl from Puebla over her head and shoulders, explains why ancient Mexico did not develop wheat and notes the surprise a European would feel in seeing a man carrying fifty pounds of water. One picture shows an Apache chief sitting in a relaxed position on a prancing horse, showing his great skill as a rider. There are illustrations of stylishly dressed and picturesquely posed Afro-Mexican soldiers and laborers. It has been said that Linati's depictions of Afro-Mexicans were less stereotypical than others at the time, but the scenes are still romanticized.

The pictures provide a valuable record of life in Mexico in the 1820s. However, they are not always reliable. The colors, added later, may vary from one copy of the book to another. Thus the picture of the Apache chief in one version shows a pale green headdress and pale blue necklace, while another version has an intense green headdress and intense blue necklace. The shield is not decorated with feathers, which would have normally been the case, in either version. In one version the coloring of the shield makes it appear to be woven like a basket rather than made from the hide of an animal.

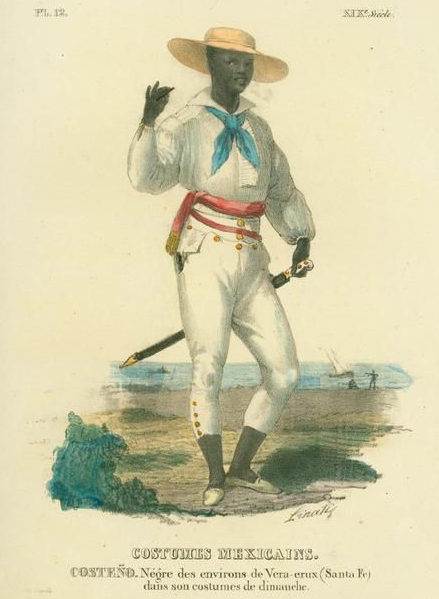
Black costeño from Veracuz

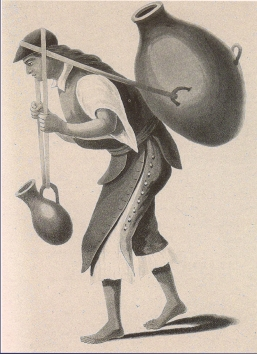
Water carrier

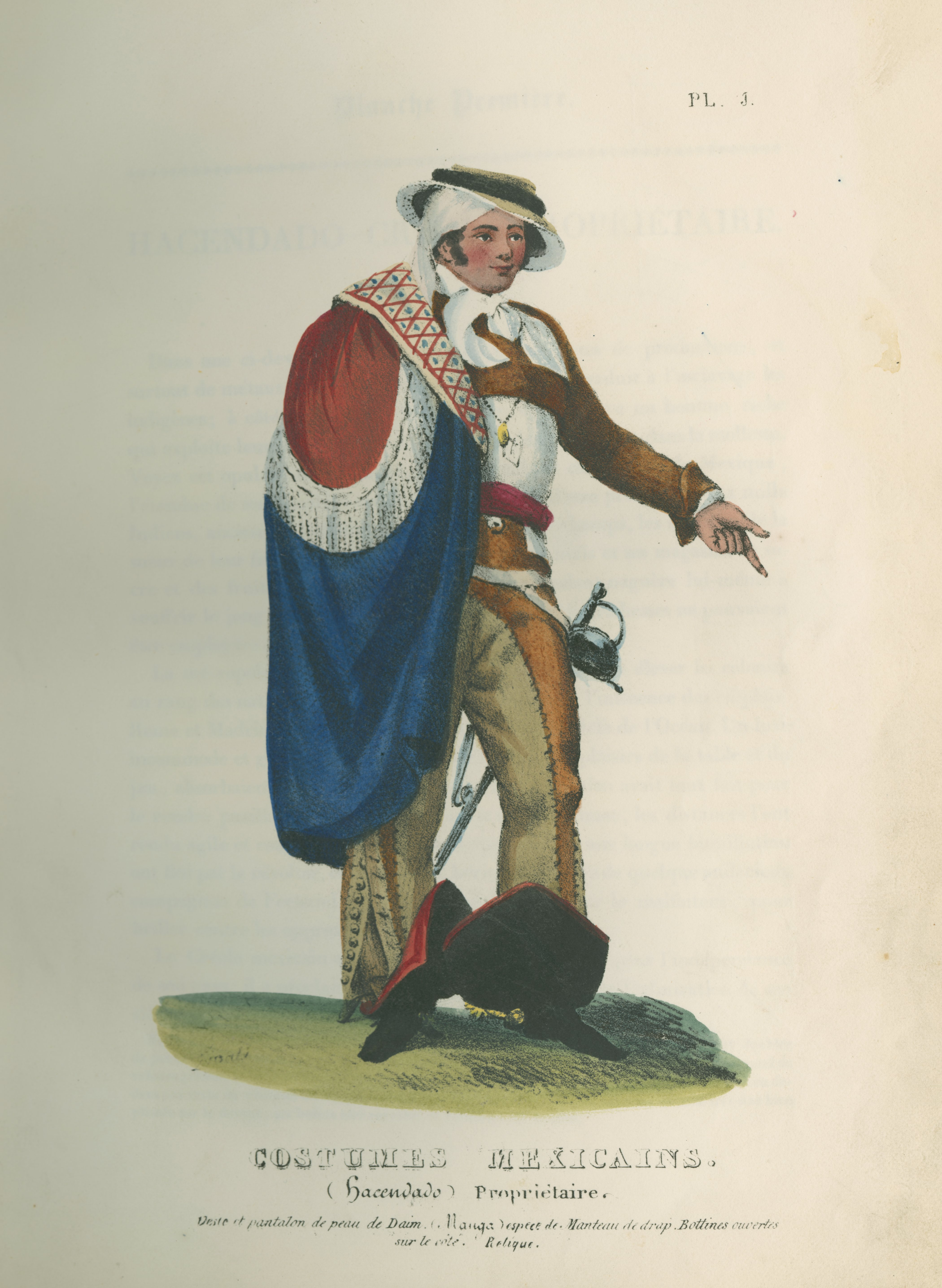
Landowner

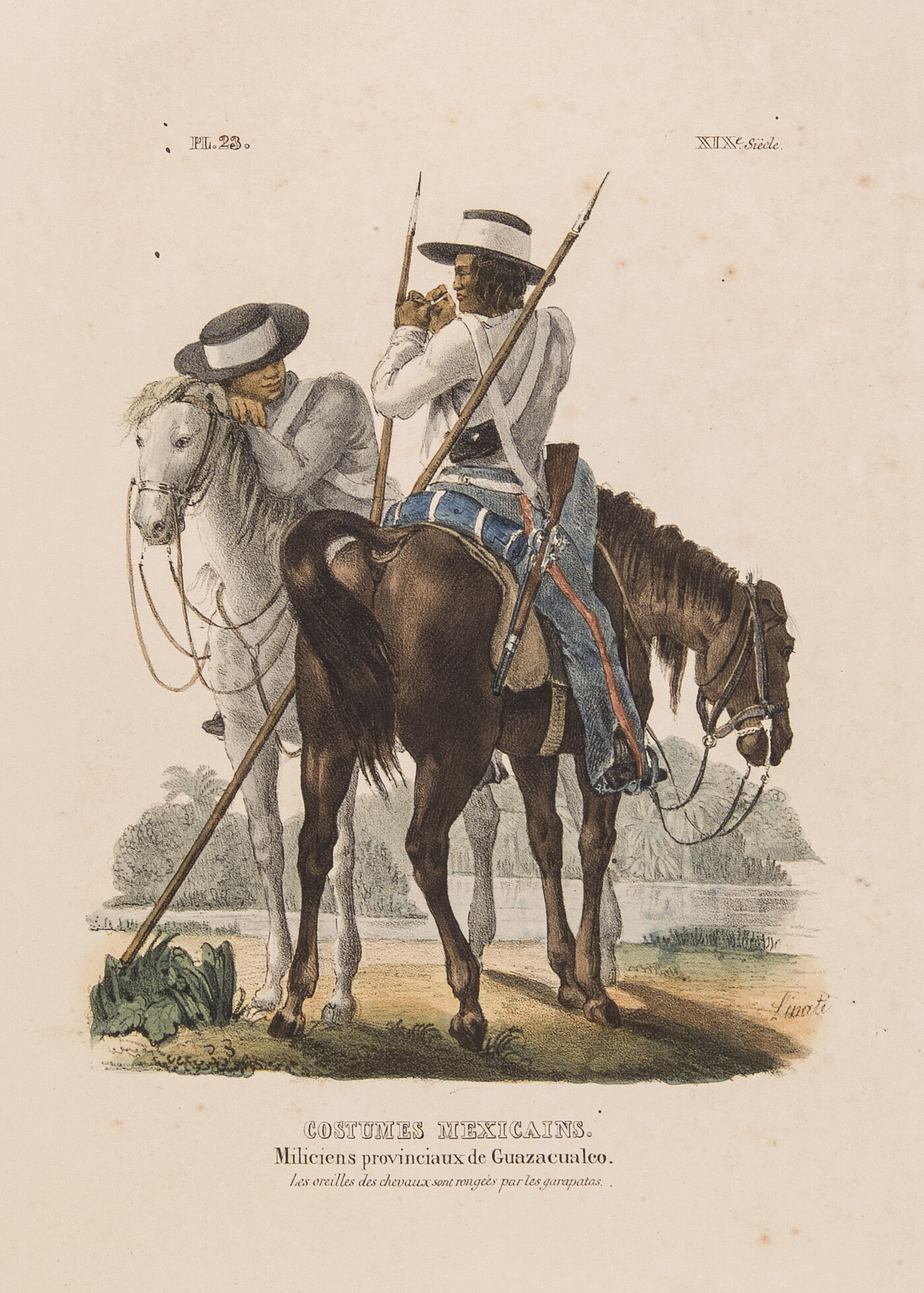
Militia of Guazacualco

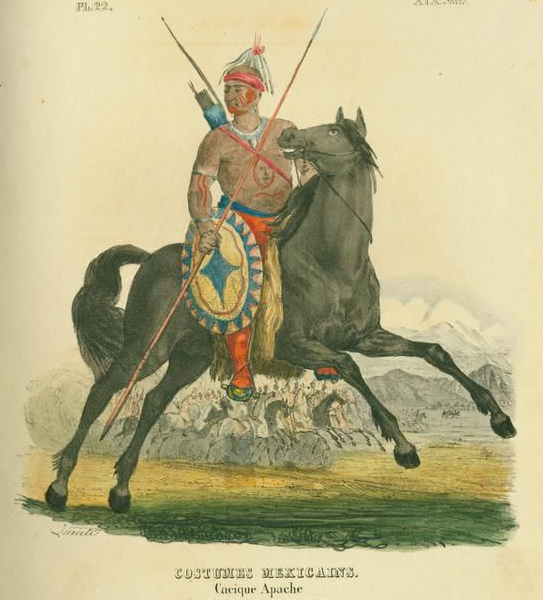
Apache chief

== Other publications ==
Other publications containing Linati's work include:

- Acuarelas y litografías, 1993
- Poesie politiche, 1811 – 1824 di Claudio Linati e Gabriele Rossetti; [a cura di Alessandro Galante Garrone]
- Nozioni elementari di arte e storia militare : ad uso degli ufficiali di fanteria del conte C. Linati
- Claudio Linati : 1790–1832 : [Epistolario, le poesie politiche di C. L. e scritti di vari autori su C. L.

== See also ==
- Ignacio Serrano
