= El Iris =

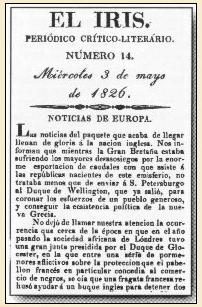
- Issue 14, 3 May 1826
- Discipline: Literature and fashion
- Language: Spanish
- Edited by: Claudio Linati, Fiorenzo Galli and José María Heredia

Publication details
- History: February–August 1826
- Frequency: Semi-weekly

Standard abbreviations
- ISO 4: Iris

El Iris was a short-lived periodical that was published between February and August 1826 in the newly independent Republic of Mexico. It was founded as an illustrated literary review, with topics of interest to women. It included articles on poetry, theater and fashion, as well as portraits and biographies of heroes of the recent war of independence. The editors held radical political opinions. El Iris published the first political cartoon in Mexico, named "Tyranny". Due to the political controversy stirred up by articles in the journal it was forced to close after printing forty issues.

== Foundation ==
The journal was established by Italian artists Claudio Linati and Florencio Galli, and the Cuban poet José María Heredia y Heredia. The two Italians had been involved in the unsuccessful struggle for Italian unity in 1820-21, and then had moved to Catalonia. Galli moved to Mexico after the Spanish liberal regime had fallen. He had arrived by January 1825, and worked for a while in the silver mines of Tlalpujahua. Linati moved first to France and then to Belgium, where he had received permission to move to Mexico, planning to start a lithography shop. He arrived in September 1825. Heridia was from Santiago de Cuba. He had been involved in the Matanzas conspiracy for Cuban independence and had taken refuge in the United States. He reached Mexico in August 1825, invited by President Guadalupe Victoria.

Linati expected to "civilize" and politicize the newly liberated Mexican people. He established his printing shop at Calle de San Agustín # 15 in Mexico City in January 1826 with two presses, one for typeface and one for lithographs. An advertisement for the new journal appeared in the Mexican newspaper El Águila on 13 January 1826, saying it would offer a pleasant distraction to all interested in letters, particularly the fair sex. The first issue appeared on 4 February 1826, in a 14 by 18 centimetres (5.5 by 7.1 in) format. The magazine was published weekly at first, and then twice a week.

== Content ==
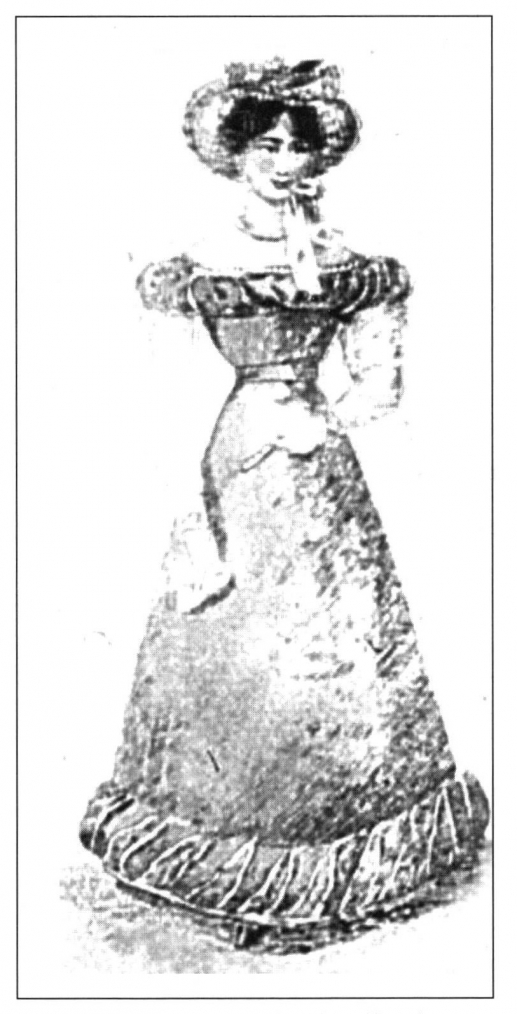
Woman in French Republican Fashion - El Iris #1

The magazine included articles on poetry, the theater, Mexican customs, biographies and court cases. Lithographs depicted antiquities and modern fashions. It also provided portraits of Guadalupe Victoria, José María Morelos and Miguel Hidalgo y Costilla, heroes of the independence struggle. The first issue included an illustration called "The Figurine" by Claudio Linati showing a woman dressed in the style of the French Republic, said to be the first colored lithograph made in Mexico. (Note: The lithographs in El Iris were the first in color, but not the first lithographs in Mexico. The newspaper El Águila Mexicana had announced the sale of a portrait of Pope Leo XII, the first lithograph made by Linati, on 16 January 1826.) In the accompanying article Linati proposed that Mexican women should adopt the simple Republican garments, which would allow them to move freely, rather than the traditional Spanish dress and mantilla. Issue 34 contained a lithograph of Miguel Hidalgo y Costilla by Linati's assistant José Gracida, the first lithograph by a Mexican to be published.

El Iris also included editorial content that sparked controversy. Linati was sure there would be another attempt by Spain to conquer Mexico. He and Galli became involved in the disputes between Yorkinos and Escoceses, rival groups of Freemasons. Linati took the Yorkino position that the people were sovereign, and only federalism could protect individuals and the nation against the depredations of the army and the priests. He was opposed to strong central authority and in favor of greater education in citizenship and the discipline of military service.

The paper published the first Mexican political cartoon, La Tiranía (Tyranny), which was attributed to Linati. This is thought to be the first political cartoon published in Mexico. El Iris demanded freedom of the press throughout Mexico.

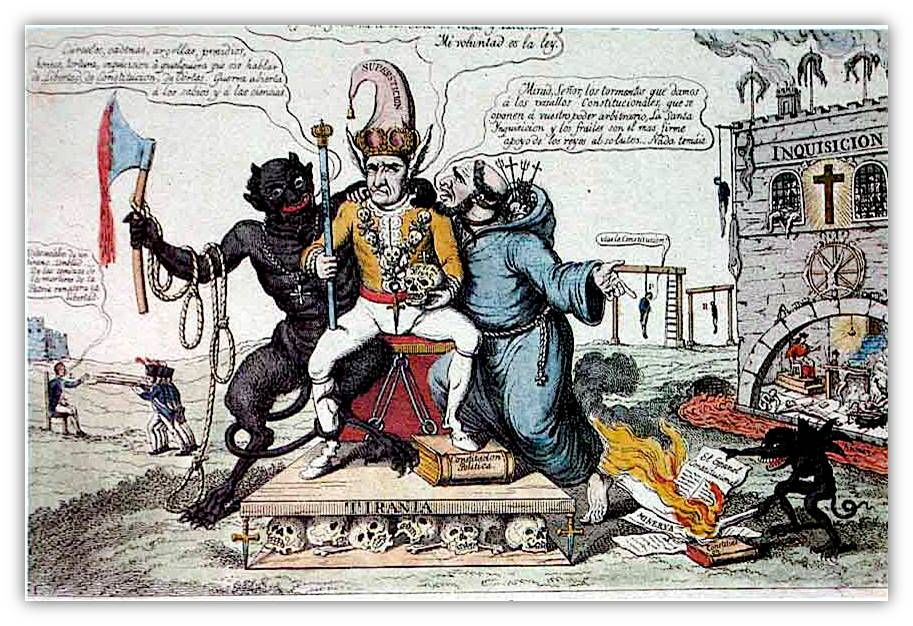
Original print of La Tiranía

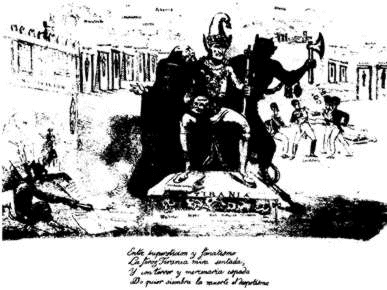
La Tiranía as it appeared published in El Iris

== Closure ==
Heredia resigned as editor on 21 June 1826, apparently due to ideological disagreements with the two Italians. He later obtained positions within the Mexican administration which indicated that he had good contacts in the government. After forty issues, the last appeared on 2 August 1826. The political comments caused the closure of the paper and forced Linati to leave the country in 1826. (Note: Linati abandoned his lithographic press when he left Mexico. It was used by Jean-Frédéric Waldeck to print his Colección de las Antigüedades Mexicanas, and by the start of 1830 hed been acquired by the Academy of San Carlos.) Although short-lived, El Iris established a lasting model for journals that printed satirical lithographs on political and social subjects.
