= Ignacio Serrano =

Mexican painter

Ignacio Serrano, also known as José Ignacio Serrano was a Mexican painter and lithographer of the 19th century. He was the first lithography docent at San Carlos Academy, where he also served as Principal.

== Biography ==
He held the rank of Lieutenant Engineer. He was also alumnus of Claudio Linati, who was since 1826 the earliest lithographer of Mexico. In 1830, Serrano became the first lithography professor at San Carlos Academy. It was with this technique that he illustrated scientific, military, topographical, civic and musical texts. He also illustrated the Cacahuamilpa grottos and the Nevado de Toluca explorations in 1835.
