= National Mexican Rite =

The National Mexican Rite is a rite of Freemasonry founded in Mexico in about 1834.

== Degree structure ==
The rite consists of six further degrees after the degree of Master Mason (commonly known as the third degree). They are fourth degree (Approved Master), fifth-degree (Knight of the Secret), sixth-degree (Knight of the Mexican Eagle), seventh-degree (Perfect Architect), eighth degree (Grand Judge), and ninth degree (Grand Inspector General). The rituals of the degrees were largely adapted from the Scottish Rite.

== Organization ==
The rite is governed by two bodies, a Grand Orient, and a National Grand Lodge. The former was composed of all members holding the ninth degree and was supreme in matters of doctrine and ritual. The latter is an elected organization responsible for the administration.

== See also ==
- Freemasonry in Mexico
- List of Masonic Rites
