= Order of the Black Eagle (disambiguation) =

Order of the Black Eagle may refer to:

== Awards and decorations ==
- Order of the Black Eagle, a Prussian knighthood rank established in 1701.
- Order of the Black Eagle, Albania, a civil award used by the short-lived Principality of Albania in 1913-1914.

== Fictional creations ==
- Order of the Black Eagle, a 1987 American action movie.
