= Virginia Guedea =

Mexican historian (born 1942)

- Born: Virginia Guedea Rincón Gallardo; March 10, 1942 (age 84); Mexico City, Mexico
- Education: National Autonomous University of Mexico
- Employer: National Autonomous University of Mexico
- Awards: Sor Juana Inés de la Cruz recognition from UNAM (2006)

Virginia Guedea Rincón Gallardo (born March 10, 1942) is a Mexican historian, writer, translator, researcher, and academic. She has specialized in the political history of the viceregal period of New Spain and the Mexican War of Independence.

== Studies ==
Guedea's first studies took place at the Instituto Mexicano Regina. In 1962, she completed a licentiate in history at the Universidad Iberoamericana. She entered the School of Philosophy and Letters of the National Autonomous University of Mexico (UNAM) where she studied for a master's degree and a doctorate through the Postgraduate Studies Division from 1963 to 1969, as a disciple of Edmundo O'Gorman. In 1990 completed a residency at the Study and Conference Center of the Rockefeller Foundation in Bellagio, Italy.

== Teaching and academics ==
Guedea has taught at the Universidad Iberoamericana, is a professor at the School of History of the Faculty of Philosophy and Arts, and tutor of the PhD program in history and architecture at UNAM. She has been a researcher at the UNAM Institute of Historical Research and the Sistema Nacional de Investigadores since 1987. She has participated in the Mora Institute's level IV stimulus program. Among her research projects are Los afanes autonomistas y las juntas de gobierno, 1808-1821, La historia en las conmemoraciones de 1960 y 1985, El golpe de Estado de 1808, and La otra historia.

She was academic secretary of the UNAM Institute of Historical Research from 1979 to 1989, and director from 1997 to 2005. Since 1997 she has been a regular member of the Mexican Academy of Sciences. She became a member of the Mexican Academy of History on March 1, 2005, where she occupies chair 24. On February 17, 2006 she read her entry speech "La otra historia o de cómo los defensores de la condición colonial recuperaron los pasados de la Nueva España", which was answered by Álvaro Matute Aguirre. Guedea has been a corresponding member of the Real Academia de la Historia since December 22, 2006. She has received recognition from the editorial board of the University of California for her work as an editor of the journal Mexican Studies/Estudios Mexicanos in 1999, and the Sor Juana Inés de la Cruz recognition from UNAM in 2006.

== Published works ==
Virginia Guedea has published several research articles, prologues, introductions, chapters, and history books, including:

- "Alzamientos y motines" in Historia de México from Salvat (1974)
- José María Morelos y Pavón. Cronología (1981)
- "La organización militar" in El gobierno provincial en la Nueva España 1570-1787 by Woodrow Borah (1985)
- "José Nemesio Vázquez, un correo insurgente" in De la historia. Homenaje a Jorge Gurría Lacroix from the UNAM Institute of Historical Research (1985)
- "Las sociedades secretas durante el movimiento de independencia" in The Independence of Mexico and the Creation of the New Nation by Jaime Rodríguez Ordóñez (1989)
- "En torno a la Independencia y la Revolución" in The Revolutionary Process in Mexico: Essays on Political and Social Change 1880-1940 by Jaime Rodríguez Ordóñez (1990)
- Las gacetas de México y la medicina (1991)
- En busca de un gobierno alterno: los Guadalupes de México (1992)
- La insurgencia en el Departamento del Norte: los Llanos de Apan y la Sierra de Puebla, 1810–1816 (1996)
- "How Relations Between Mexico and the United States Began", co-author with Jaime Rodríguez Ordóñez in Myths, Misdeeds and Misunderstandings The Roots of Conflict in U.S.-Mexican Relations by Kathryn Vincent (1997)
- "La crisis imperial española" in Gran historia de México ilustrada by Josefina Zoraida Vázquez (2001)
- Memorias de la Revolución mexicana, translation of the work by William Davis Robinson (2003)
- "La Nueva España" in 1808 La eclosión juntera en el mundo hispano Manuel Chust (2007)
