= Manuel Codorniu =

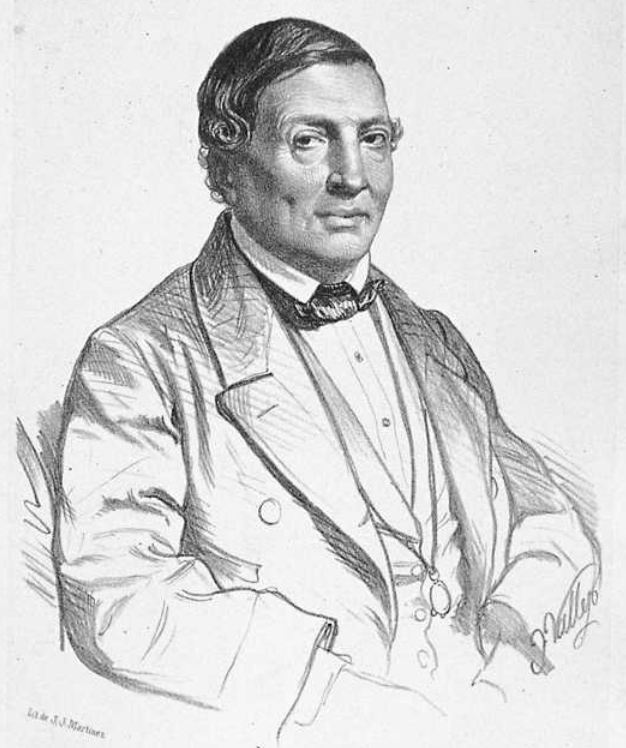
- Portrait by José Vallejo y Galeazo (1855)

Senator for Tarragona
- In office 1841–1843
- Monarch: Isabella II of Spain
- Preceded by: Antonio Rodes

Deputy for Castellón to the Constituent Cortes
- In office 13 November 1854 – 2 September 1856
- Monarch: Isabella II of Spain

Personal details
- Born: Manuel Codorniu y Ferreras; 1 June 1788 Esparreguera, Province of Barcelona, Catalonia
- Died: 18 July 1857 (aged 69) Madrid, Spain
- Children: Antonio Codorniu y Nieto
- Parent: Manuel Codorniu Vidal
- Education: University of Cervera

Manuel Codorniu y Ferreras (1 June 1788 – 18 July 1857) was a Spanish military physician, educator and publisher who served in the Senate (1841–1843) and in the Constituent Cortes (1854–1856) of his native country.

During his lifetime, he headed several medical and political publications —including El Sol, an influential masonic newspaper that actively opposed Mexican Emperor Agustín de Iturbide in the 1820s— and started an education program in Mexico based on the works of Joseph Lancaster.

== Biography ==
Manuel Codorniu y Ferreras was born in Esparreguera, a small town in the Province of Barcelona, Catalonia, on 1 June 1788. Both his father and grandfather were physicians, and his father, Manuel Codorniu Vidal, served as a military physician as well.

He joined the Conciliar Seminary of Barcelona in 1797 and took courses in Latin, Rhetoric, Physics, Mathematics and Metaphysics. In 1804, he graduated with a degree in philosophy (Spanish: bachiller en Filosofía) from the University of Cervera and took some courses in Pathology and clinical practice at the University of Valencia. After enrolling in a group of volunteers at the Royal University of Toledo —where courses could be accredited without examination— he returned to Cervera and graduated with a degree in medicine in 1810.

He enlisted at the royal army when the Peninsular War broke out between Spanish monarchists and French imperial forces commanded by Napoléon Bonaparte. Carlos Nagués assigned him to the Sant Ferran Castle, where he was taken prisoner on 3 May 1811. After the conflict came to and end, he received military awards and a royal pension from King Ferdinand VII.

He joined the Overseas Army (Spanish: Ejército de Ultramar) and left for the New Spain, arriving to the Port of Veracruz with liberal Viceroy Juan O'Donojú on 31 June 1821. In Mexico, he researched several endemic diseases and became actively involved in Scottish Rite masonic lodges, which at the time served as Royalist political clubs but, in contrast with the local Conservative parties, strongly resisted further influence from the Catholic Church in public affairs. In Mexico City, he founded El Sol, an influential newspaper that opposed Emperor Agustín de Iturbide and cofounded the Compañía Lancasteriana to implement innovative education practices popularized by Joseph Lancaster through the British and Foreign School Society.

Spain's persistent refusal to recognize the Mexican independence sparked a nationalist revolt in 1827, and Mexican President Guadalupe Victoria ordered the deportation of most Spanish-born citizens. Codorniu's political enemies took advantage of the situation, sent him to a refugees' colony and made sure he abandoned the country.

Back in Spain, he was tried by the Purification Tribunal —responsible for exiles and prisoners,— found guilty and discharged from the army in 1829. In 1836, after years practicing medicine privately and volunteering in several epidemic crises, he was readmitted. A few years later, he was elected senator for Tarragona (1841–1843) and deputy for Castellón to the Constituent Cortes (1854–1856). He was grandfather of the notorious forester Ricardo Codorníu y Stárico, who led exemplary reforestations in the 19th century in southeastern Spain.

He died in Madrid on 18 July 1857, at the age of 69.

== Books ==
- Historia de la salvación del ejército expedicionario de Ultramar de la fiebre amarilla (1820)
- Angina exantemática de México y demás enfermedades endémicas y epidémicas del país (1825)
- Conocimiento, curación y método precautivo de la enfermedad epidémica llamada vulgarmente el susto de la pinacata y demás afecciones catarrales (1826)
- El tifus castrense y civil (1838)
- Reglamento de Hospitales Militares (1838)
- Observaciones sobre las enfermedades más perniciosas que han reinado en el ejército en 1844 (1845)
- Aviso preventivo contra el cólera epidémico (1849)
- Formulario de los medicamentos para hospitales militares (1850)
- Alocución a los individuos del cuerpo de Sanidad militar (1854)
