= Freemasonry in Mexico =

The history of Freemasonry in Mexico can be traced to at least 1806, when the first Masonic lodge was formally established in the nation. Many presidents of Mexico were Freemasons, and the movement greatly influenced political actions in the early republic, as holders of conservative ideas gathered in lodges of the Scottish Rite, while reformists chose the York Rite. Hence, escoceses became synonymous with Conservatives and yorkinos with Liberals. Antonio López de Santa Anna was a Scottish Rite Mason.

== History ==
Freemasonry arrived in colonial Mexico during the second half of the 18th century, brought by French immigrants who settled in the capital. However, they were condemned by the local Inquisition and forced to desist. It is probable, though no written evidence exists, that there were itinerant lodges in the Spanish army in New Spain. Freemasons may even have been able to participate in the first autonomist movements, then for independence, conveying the ideas of enlightenment in the late 18th century. Some historians, both Freemasons and non-Freemasons, including Leon Zeldis Mendel and José Antonio Ferrer Benimeli have emphasized that Freemasonry in Latin America had built its own mythology, well away from what history records. The distinction between Patriotic Latin American Societies and Masonic lodges is tenuous. Between the late 18th and early 19th century, their operative structure was very similar, as is indicated by the historian Virginia Guedea.

The first Masonic Lodge of Mexico, Arquitectura Moral, was founded in 1806. The year 1813 saw the creation of the first Grand Lodge of Mexico, the Scottish Rite.

Jose Maria Mateos, a leading liberal politician of the late 19th century, stated in 1884 that some illustrious autonomists and independentists, such as Miguel Hidalgo y Costilla, José María Morelos and Ignacio Allende, were Freemasons. According to Mateos, they were, for the most part, initiated into the lodge Arquitectura Moral (now Bolivar No. 73), but it is true that there are no documents to prove his point. However, some documents suggest that the first Governor of independent Mexico, the emperor Agustín de Iturbide, and the Dominican friar Servando Teresa de Mier, were both Freemasons. But it is true that it was common for the Inquisition to use the charge of belonging to Freemasonry in order to attack autonomists and independence leaders, which guarantees the impossibility of proving the innocence of the accused, due to the clandestine nature of the Orders. Thus, the archives of the Inquisition do not eliminate the uncertainties on this subject.

From independence in 1821 until 1982, it is believed that many Mexican leaders belonged to Freemasonry. When political independence came about, the few existing lodges came out of hiding and multiplied. With the arrival of the Minister Plenipotentiary of the United States Joel Roberts Poinsett, the young Mexican Freemasonry was divided into two political movements, without really being defined. Poinsett promoted the creation of the Lodge of York Rite, close to the interests of the United States. Meanwhile, conservative Freemasons of the Scottish Lodge of the young Ancient and Accepted Scottish Rite, headed by the physician of the last viceroy from Barcelona, Manuel Codorniu, manifested their opposition to the realization of the interventionist theory Manifest Destiny in the newspaper "El Sol". Thus, Freemasons who supported American-style liberalism met around the lodges of the York Rite, while Freemasons who would be seen as "conservatives" remained close to the Scottish lodges, although they considered themselves heirs of Spanish liberalism. Soon, those Freemasons who did not identify with the existing alternatives would choose a third way in founding in 1825 a national rite called the National Mexican Rite, which would aim to create a political model for, and a clean government in, Mexico.

During the French military occupation that placed Maximilian I of Mexico on the throne in 1864, various French military lodges, dependent on the Grand Orient de France, arrived in Mexico, but disappeared when the French left the country. Thus, it is very likely that these Itinerant Lodges of the French Rite, due to their status as being perceived as invaders, left no influences of ritual. At the museum of Masonic Grand Orient of France, one banner of one of those lodges is preserved.

During the nineteenth century Freemasonry was being heralded as a means of removing the influences of the Catholic Church. Several of the men who were masons had expressed a desire to free women from the church's grasp through education, and they approached Laureana Wright de Kleinhans to help spread freemasonry. Though she was totally committed to the education of women, she ultimately rejected the organization because they refused to acknowledge the equality of men and women and in fact had an initiation oath which declared "never admit to their ranks a blind man, a madman, or a woman".

According to historian Karen Racine, Freemasons in the presidency of Mexico included: Guadalupe Victoria, Valentín Gómez Farías, Antonio López de Santa Anna, Benito Juárez, Sebastián Lerdo de Tejada, Porfirio Díaz, Francisco I. Madero, Venustiano Carranza, Plutarco Elías Calles, Lázaro Cárdenas, Emilio Portes Gil, Pascual Ortiz Rubio, Abelardo L. Rodríguez, Miguel Alemán Valdés and Adolfo Lopez Mateos.

== Major Rites ==
=== National Mexican Rite ===
The National Mexican Rite is a rite of Freemasonry founded in Mexico in about 1834. The rite consists of six further degrees after the degree of Master Mason. They are fourth degree (Approved Master), fifth-degree (Knight of the Secret), sixth-degree (Knight of the Mexican Eagle), seventh-degree (Perfect Architect), eighth degree (Grand Judge), and ninth degree (Grand Inspector General). The rituals of the degrees were largely adapted from the Scottish Rite.

=== Ancient and Accepted Scottish Rite ===
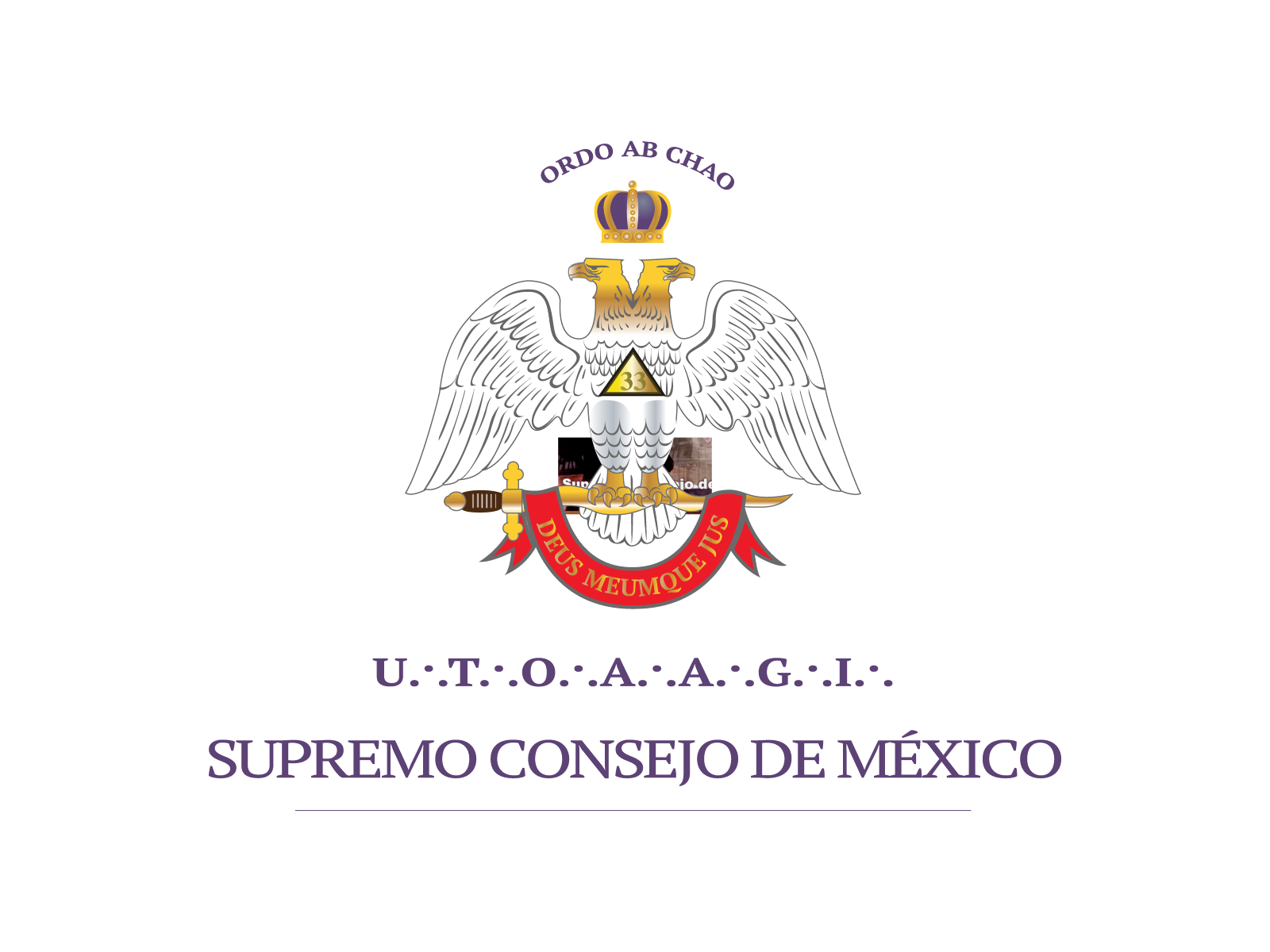
Supreme Council of México Coat of Arms

The Supreme Council of Mexico was founded in the year 1860, when Charles Laffon de Ladebat 33º, Active Member and Grand Master of Ceremonies of the Supreme Council of the United States, Southern Jurisdiction, arrived at the Port of Veracruz with the mission of establishing a Supreme Council. Brother Charles Laffon, together with liberal Masons residing in the port, founded the Supreme Council of Mexico, establishing the only Supreme Council in the country that is regular and internationally recognized.

Years later, the Supreme Council of Mexico was established in Mexico City, on Donceles Street, electing as Sovereign Grand Commander the former Grand Master of the Grand Lodge Valle de México, James C. Lohse. Thus, for several years, the Supreme Council of Mexico shared its headquarters with the Grand Lodge Valle de México.

From that moment on, the Supreme Council of Mexico has become the most important Masonic organization in the country. It is composed of Masons who have attained the 33rd Degree of the Ancient and Accepted Scottish Rite (AASR), and its principal function is to administer and regulate the practice of Degrees 4 through 33. It is also responsible for granting charters to the philosophical bodies of the AASR in the country, being the only authority authorized to create new Valleys and Camps.

In addition to its role as the governing body of the AASR in Mexico, the Supreme Council of Mexico is also a strong advocate for Masonic values such as liberty, equality, and fraternity. The Supreme Council of Mexico promotes the ongoing education and formation of Masons throughout the country and works to foster dialogue and unity among the various Masonic lodges in Mexico.

=== York Rite ===
The York Rite bodies in Mexico are integrated into two bodies that practice Royal Arch Masonry as recognized internationally:

- The Grand Chapter of Royal Arch Masons of Mexico (Gran Capítulo de Masones del Real Arco de México)
- The Grand Chapter of Royal Arch Masons of the United States of Mexico (Gran Capítulo de Masones del Real Arco de los Estados Unidos Mexicanos)

The next degree-conferring bodies are:

- The Grand Council of Cryptic Masons Of México
- The Grand Commandery of Knights Templar of Valiente y Magnánima Orden del Temple de México

The York Rite bodies have a horizontal structure, as opposed to the vertical Scottish Rite where the philosophical degrees commence with the 4th to the 33rd degree. However, entrance has always been through the Royal Arch degrees, which enable all Master Masons who have taken the Royal Arch degrees to continue their path in search of further light in Masonry with the Cryptic and Commandery degrees. These last two degrees can be chosen separately and in no particular order.

In Mexico the Regular York Rite bodies with international recognition are the Royal Arch Chapters, the Councils of Cryptic Masons and The Grand Commanderies of the Knights Templar.

As a result, the General Grand Chapter Royal Arch Masons International only supports and acknowledges two Royal Arch Grand Chapters in Mexico:

The Grand Chapter of Royal Arch of Mexico (Gran Capítulo de Masones del Real Arco de México).

Located in CDMX, and presided (2023–2026) by:

- M.E.C. Dan Tartakovsky Olechnowicz as Grand High Priest;
- M.E.C. Alejandro Hernández as Grand King;
- M.E.C. José Julian Cholula Muñoz as Grand Scribe;
- M.E.C. Jesús Isaac Medel Robledo as Grand Secretary;
- M.E.C. Guillermo Leyva Aceves as Grand Treasurer.

The Grand Chapter of Royal Arch Masons of Mexico have next constituent chapters:

- Michoacán (Mich) No. 1
- Tijuana (BC) No. 7
- Mexicali (BC) No. 8
- Caballeros del Real Arco (CDMX) No. 9
- Tetelictic (Pue) No. 10
- Green Dragon (CDMX) No. 12
- San Luis Potosí (SLP) No. 17
- Génesis 1:28 (SLP) No. 18
- Constructores del Tabernáculo (NL) No. 19
- Coahuila (Coahuila) No. 22
- Annubis (BC) No. 25

The Grand Chapter of Royal Arch Masons of the United States of Mexico (Gran Capítulo de Masones del Real Arco de los Estados Unidos Mexicanos)

Located in the city of Guadalajara, state of Jalisco, and presided (2014–16) by:

- M.E.C. Juan Ramón Negrete Marín as Grand High Priest;
- M.E.C. Christian Martinez Sandoval as Grand King;
- M.E.C. Mario Tanús Herrera as Grand Scribe;
- M.E.C. Joaquín Vega Antúnez as Grand Secretary;
- M.E.C. Ricardo Preciado Ploneda as Grand Treasurer.

Both Grand Chapters have Ambassadors as appointed by the General Grand Chapter:

- Grand Chapter of Mexico - Ambassador - Ricardo Preciado Ploneda
- Grand Chapter of the USM - Ambassador - Ricardo Preciado Ploneda

The Grand Council of Cryptic Masons of México Located in the city of Guadalajara, state of Jalisco

The Grand Commandery of Knightsof Valiente y Magnánima Orden del Temple de México Located in CDMX, and Presided (2025–2026) by:

- SK Eliseo Neri Morales as Eminent Grand Commander;
- SK Fernando Franco Zaragoza Deputy Grand Commander;
- SK Alejandro Cortes Ramírez as Grand Generalissimo;
- SK Jesús Ramón Olvera Pale as Grand Captain General;
- SK Amado Ovidio Gil Siqueiros as Grand Recorder;
- SK Guillermo Layva Aceves as Grand Treasurer;
- SK Luis Eduardo Luna Arredondo as Past Grand Commander (2023-2025);
- SK Jaime Lovera Centeno as Past Grand Commander (2021-2023);
- SK Omar Ali Guzmán as Past Grand Commander (2019-2021);
- SK Augusto Rodrigo Cervantes Gutiérrez as Past Grand Commander (2017-2019);
- SK Marco Enrique Rosales Gutierrez as Past Grand Commander (2011-2017);
- SK Jaime Rios Otero as Past Grand Commander (2008-2011).

The Grand Commandery of Mexico has 21 constituent Commanderies:

- Al Aqsa No. 1
- Caballeros de Magdala No. 2
- Provincia de la Vera Cruz No. 3
- Aridoamericana No. 4
- Hugues de Paynes No. 5
- J.B de Molay No. 6
- Orden de la Veracruz No. 7
- Fabian Guzmán Castillo No. 8
- Guardianes del Santo Sepulcro No. 9
- Rosslyn No. 10
- Simonem Cyreneum No. 11
- Santo Grial No. 12
- Monte Moriat No. 13
- Ora et Labora No. 14
- Raza Purepecha No. 15
- José Magallanes Caldera No. 16
- Estado de México No. 17
- San Bernardo UD
- Capital City UD
- Caballeros de Payns UD
- Coxala UD
- Grand Encampment of Knights Templar, U.S.A - Ambassador - SK Luis Eduardo Luna Arredondo

There are additional honorary or invitational degrees available as well as para-masonic national organizations.

- Pelotón de la Muerte

== Mexican Masonic Organisation ==
=== Confederations ===
==== Confederation of Regular Grand Lodges of the United Mexican States ====
The Confederation of Regular Grand Lodges of the Mexican United States, Spanish: Confederación de las Grandes Regulares Logia de los Estados Unidos Mexicanos, brings together the Regular Grand Lodges in Mexico since 1932. It is headed by the Masonic National Council, Spanish: Consejo Nacional Masónico, consisting of grand masters of the grand lodges members of the confederation. Each of the Grand Lodges is recognized by some of the State Grand Lodges in the United States, but no US State Grand Lodge recognizes all of them. The confederation includes the Grand Lodges of 30 states of the 31 states that constitute the United Mexican States:

- Aguascalientes, "Profesor Edmundo Games Orozco"
- Baja California,
- Baja California Sur,
- Campeche,
- Chiapas,
- Chihuahua, "Cosmos",
- Coahuila, "Benito Juárez",
- Colima, "Sur Oueste",
- Durango, "Guadalupe Victoria"
- Guanajuato,
- Guerrero,
- Hidalgo,
- Jalisco, "Occidental Mexicana",
- Estado de Mexico,
- Michoacán, "Lázaro Cárdenas",
- Morelos,
- Nayarit,
- Nuevo León,
- Oaxaca, "Benito Juárez García",
- Puebla, "Benemérito Ejército de Oriente",
- Querétaro,
- Quitana Roo, "Andrés Quintana Roo",
- San Luis Potosí, "Soberana e Independiente del Potosí",
- Sinaloa del REAyA
- Sonora, "Pacífico",
- Tabasco, "Restauración",
- Tamaulipas,
- Veracruz, "Unidad Mexicana",
- Yucatán, "La Oriental Peninsular,
- Zacatecas, "Jesús González Ortega".

=== Federal Grand Lodges ===
==== York Grand Lodge of Mexico ====
The York Grand Lodge of Mexico, founded in 1862, whose official name is The Most Worshipful York Grand Lodge of Mexico, is recognized by the United Grand Lodge of England and all Grand Lodges of the United States. It exclusively works in the York Rite, in English, Spanish, and German, with English being its official language. It has 18 lodges spread across the states of Nuevo León, Coahuila, Chihuahua, Sinaloa, Jalisco, San Luis Potosí, Morelos, Veracruz, and Mexico City.

In 1864, a Portuguese man named Manuel Reis arrived in Mexico City. He was initiated into Freemasonry in Rio de Janeiro in 1844, emigrated to New York in 1856, and joined the Consistory of New York, attaining the 32nd Degree. In 1858, he moved to Havana, Cuba, where he was somewhat active in organizing Lodges, etc. Upon arriving in Mexico City, he was 44 or 45 years old and had a perfect knowledge of Masonic ritual. He eventually affiliated with the "Union Fraternal" Lodge and, due to his extensive knowledge of Freemasonry, became the driving force of the Lodge; he organized the Supreme Council and also suggested dividing the "Union Fraternal" Lodge into three Lodges.

This was accomplished with one Lodge working in English, one in French, and one in German. In 1862, these three Lodges formed the Grand Lodge under the name "Grand Lodge Valle de México". Having been duly organized, "Grand Lodge Valle de México" began to exercise its functions by issuing Dispensations and Charters throughout the country, thus beginning its legitimate career.

The Grand Lodge Valle de México is the precursor of what we now know as the York Grand Lodge of Mexico.

The Lodges in the city, "Union Fraternal," "Paz y Concordia," and "Toltecas," joined under the auspices of the Supreme Council and reorganized the "Grand Lodge Valle de México".

Between 1910 and 1911, an internal crisis caused a small group of Lodges to break away and decide to go their own way under the name of "La Gran Logia Valle de México". Therefore, to distance itself from the newly created grand lodge, it was unanimously agreed to change the name from "Grand Lodge Valle de México" to "The Most Worshipful York Grand Lodge of Mexico, F. and A.M."

The York Grand Lodge Mexico continued its work, and the secessionists continued on their own path under the name of "Gran Logia Valle de México".

==== Grand Lodge Valle de Mexico ====
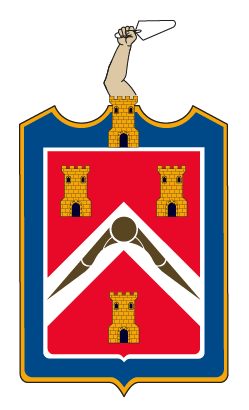

The Grand Lodge Valle de México, whose official name is the Most Worshipful Grand Lodge "Valle de México", is currently one of the largest Masonic institutions in Mexico and throughout the Spanish-speaking world. It primarily practices the Ancient and Accepted Scottish Rite, while also including within its obedience one lodge of the York Rite and another of the French Rite. The Most Worshipful Grand Lodge "Valle de México" was established on February 5, 1862. Its three founding Lodges were: "Unión Fraternal", which worked in Spanish; "Emulos de Hiram", which worked in French; and "Eintracht", which worked in German. These three lodges originated from the "Unión Fraternal" Lodge No. 1, whose Charter was granted by the Grand Orient Neogranadino of Cartagena, Republic of Colombia.

Thus, following a petition submitted on December 25, 1861, by several brethren from the Unión Fraternal Lodge, the aforementioned Grand Orient issued the Grand Charter that marks the origin of the Grand Lodge "Valle de México", with James C. Lohse serving as its first Grand Master.

By Decree dated June 25, 1910, the United Mexican Grand Lodge of Free and Accepted Masons of Veracruz, through its Decree No. 25 signed by then Grand Master Plutarco I. Ramírez, definitively and permanently ceded the Masonic Territory of Mexico City, the State of Mexico, Sonora, Guanajuato, Jalisco, San Luis Potosí, Aguascalientes, and Hidalgo in favor of the Grand Lodge "Valle de México". The Decree explicitly states that said cession was made exclusively in favor of the Grand Lodge "Valle de México" and not to any other Masonic authority.

In 1934, the year of the founding of the Confederation of Regular Grand Lodges of Mexico, the Grand Lodge Valle de México signed a treaty with the other existing Grand Lodges in Mexico, with the objective of defining Masonic jurisdictions within Mexican territory. It established its jurisdiction as follows: The Grand Lodge “Valle de México” for the Federal District, headquartered in Mexico City, with jurisdiction also extending over the States of Aguascalientes, Zacatecas, Guanajuato, Michoacán, Querétaro, Hidalgo, Mexico, Tlaxcala, Morelos, Guerrero, Puebla, and the Southern District of Baja California. The signing of this treaty likely took place during the same event as the founding of the Confederation of Regular Grand Lodges of Mexico, which was held in Tampico, Tamaulipas.

In 1944, the Independent Mexican Symbolic Grand Lodge decided to merge, along with its 36 symbolic lodges, with the Grand Lodge Valle de México, which by that year already had over 77 symbolic lodges under its jurisdiction. At that time, the Grand Master was Valentín Rincón. Thus, on November 21 of that year, the Most Worshipful Grand Lodge "Valle de México" officially emerged by virtue of Decree No. 433. Its first Grand Master under this new name was Fernando Benavides García, formerly of the Independent Mexican Grand Lodge.

In 1934, the Most Worshipful Grand Lodge "Valle de México" founded the Masonic Confederation of Regular Grand Lodges of the United Mexican States, with the participation of the following Grand Lodges:

- Grand Lodge of the State of Coahuila "Benito Juárez"
- Grand Lodge of the State of Campeche
- Grand Lodge of the State of Chihuahua "Cosmos"
- Grand Lodge of the State of Chiapas
- Grand Lodge of the State of Nuevo León
- Grand Lodge of the State of Tamaulipas
- Grand Lodge "El Potosí" of the State of San Luis Potosí
- Grand Lodge "Guadalupe Victoria" of the State of Durango
- Grand Lodge "Occidental Mexicana" of the State of Jalisco
- Grand Lodge "Unida Mexicana" of the State of Veracruz
- Grand Lodge "Valle de México"

In the 1990s, the Grand Lodge Valle de México announced its withdrawal from the Confederation of Regular Grand Lodges of the United Mexican States, as said confederation had become a civil association and had adopted statutes and principles that deviated from the original purpose for which the Confederation was founded.

=== State Grand Lodges ===
- Grand Lodge of Baja California
- Grand Lodge of Baja California Sur
- Grand Lodge of Campeche
- Grand Lodge of Chiapas
- Chihuahua: Grand Lodge Cosmos
- Coahuila: Grand Lodge 'Benito Juarez' (Note: As the result of a schism in 1977, there are now two grand lodges in Coahuila using the same name, "Gran Logia 'Benito Juarez' del Estado de Coahuila." The original grand lodge, which is regular, operates out of offices located at Bahia de Ballenas #933; Colonia Nueva California; Torreon, Coahuila C.P. 27089. It is a member of the Confederation of Regular Grand Lodges of the Mexican United States)
- Colima: Grand Lodge Sur-Oeste

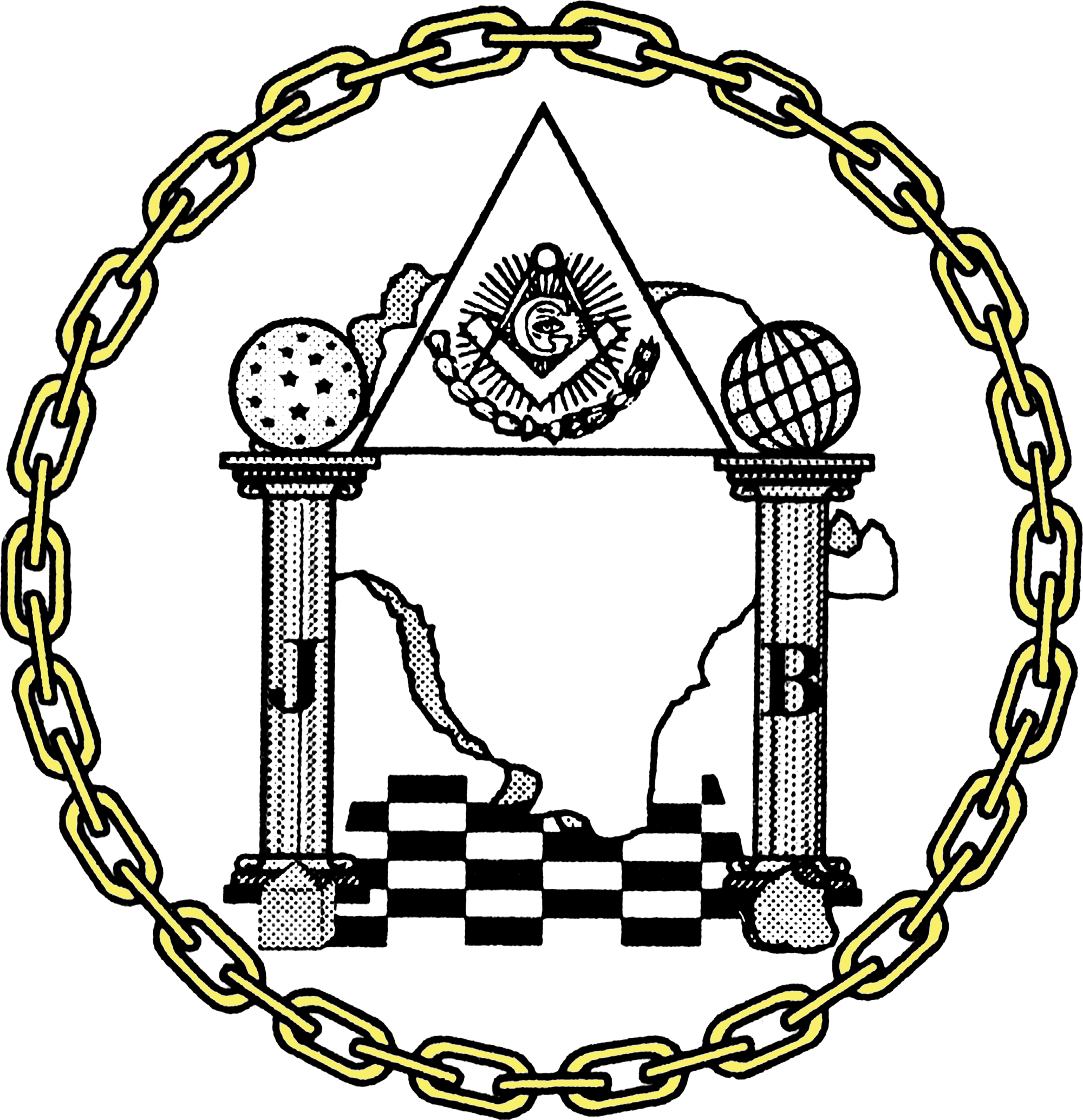
Seal of the Grand Lodge "Guadalupe Victoria" of Durango State

- Durango: Grand Lodge Guadalupe Victoria. The Grand Lodge "Guadalupe Victoria" (the first president of Mexico) of Durango State is a federation of Masonic lodges of the State of Durango in Mexico. It was created in 1923, but before that date, the lodges of the state depended on the Grand Lodge of the State of Coahuila. His lodges practice exclusively the Ancient and Accepted Scottish Rite. The Grand Lodge is located in the capital of the State, Durango. It is a founding member of the Confederation of Regular Grand Lodges of the United States of Mexico. As such, it has an important role in the Mexican Freemasonry. Each year it participates to the seminars of Grand Lodges of Mexico to synthesize the work on the society facts done in its lodges. The symposium ends with sending the summary of its analysis to the Government of the Mexican Republic
- Grand Lodge of Hidalgo
- Jalisco: Grand Lodge Occidental Mexicana
- Michoacana: Grand Lodge Lazaro Cardenas
- Grand Lodge of Nayarit
- Grand Lodge of Nuevo León
- Oaxaca: Grand Lodge Benito Juarez Garcia
- Grand Lodge of Querétaro
- Grand Lodge of Quintana Roo
- San Luis Potosí: Grand Lodge El Potosi
- Grand Lodge of Sinaloa REAyA
- Sonora: Grand Lodge Del Pacífico
- Tabasco: Grand Lodge Restauración
- Grand Lodge of Tamaulipas
- Veracruz: Grand Lodge Unida Mexicana
- Yucatán: Grand Lodge Oriental Peninsular

=== Le Droit Humain ===
The International Order of Freemasonry Le Droit Humain is a global Masonic Order, it is also present in Mexico through its Mexican Jurisdiction which has 6 lodges.

== See also ==
- Freemasonry in Latin America

== Notes ==
=== Bibliography ===
- Gould, Robert Freke (1887). Gould's History of Freemasonry Throughout the World, Volume IV. Charles Scribner's Sons.
