= José María Heredia y Heredia =

Cuban-born poet (1803–1839)

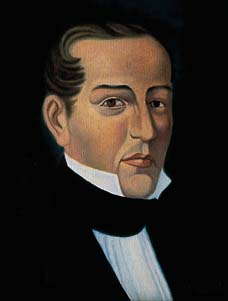
José María Heredia

José María Heredia y Heredia, also known as José María Heredia y Campuzano (December 31, 1803 – May 7, 1839) was a Cuban-born poet considered by many to be the first romantic poet of the Americas and the initiator of Latin American romanticism. More recently, this view has been qualified, highlighting Heredia's roots in Neoclassicism and the aesthetics of eighteenth-century Sensibility. He is known as "El Cantor del Niagara" and regarded as one of the most important poets in the Spanish language. He has also been named National Poet of Cuba.

Heredia studied at the University of Havana, and received a law degree in 1823. In the autumn of 1823 he was arrested on a charge of conspiracy against the Spanish government for participating in pro-independence activities against the Spanish authorities, and was sentenced to banishment for life. To avoid the sentence, Heredia fled to the United States and spent two years in New York City when he was 19. He then took refuge in Mexico in 1825. For a few months he was one of the editors of the literary magazine El Iris. He became naturalized as a citizen of Mexico and obtained a post as magistrate.

Many of his earlier pieces are merely clever translations from French, English and Italian; but his originality is placed beyond doubt by such poems as the Himno del desterrado, the epistle to Emilia, Desengaños, and the celebrated ode to Niágara. One of his most celebrated poems was called "En El Teocalli de Cholula," which explores the universality of nature and immense beauty of indigenous ruins. In common with a number of Spanish and Latin American Romantics, his intellectual formation was in Neoclassicism, and indeed his poetry is notable for its perfection of form as well as (often) the sincerity and depth of his feelings. Heredia published a first edition of his poems (Poesías) during his stay in New York, in 1825, to great acclaim both in the Americas and in Western Europe. Andrés Bello (from his exile in London) and Alberto Lista (from Spain) acknowledged the precociousness of Heredia, praising the originality and freshness of his poetry. A significantly expanded second collection, that included revised versions of many of the poems found in the earlier edition, saw the light in Toluca in 1832, also published by Heredia himself. In 1836 he obtained permission to visit Cuba for two months to reunite with his mother. Disappointed in his political ambitions, and broken in health, Heredia returned to Mexico in January 1837, and died in Mexico City on 7 May 1839.

== Childhood ==
José María Heredia was born in Santiago de Cuba on December 31, 1803, to parents José Francisco Heredia Mieses and Mercedes Heredia Campuzano-Polanco, natives of Santo Domingo. As a young boy in Cuba, he learned how to read and write Latin and Greek and translated famous works such as Homer, Horace, and other classical authors and texts. He spent the majority of his upbringing in Santo Domingo for his family moved there when he was still a small child. His father was appointed Magistrate at the Court of Caracas, and the family moved to Venezuela because of his job.

== Middle years ==
He returned to Cuba from Venezuela in 1818 and then registered at the University of Havana at the young age of 14. He did not stay at the University of Havana long; he continued his career the following year in Mexico. The death of his father, José Francisco Heredia, in 1820 caused his son José María to return to Cuba the following year from Mexico.

== Heredia in the United States ==
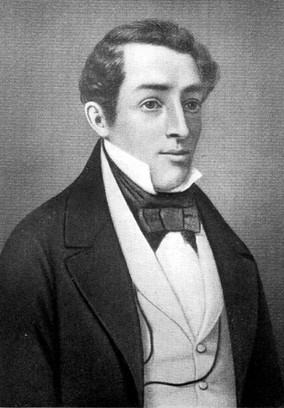
Jose Maria Heredia in his younger years

Heredia's time in the United States lasted from December 4, 1823, until August 22, 1825. The reason his time living in the United States was cut short was because he was extended a personal invitation from Guadalupe Victoria, the president of Mexico at the time, for a permanent residency in Mexico. As a "youth of twenty with an abhorrence for English," he traveled between cities: Boston, New York, New Haven, Philadelphia. While in these cities, he lived in boarding homes with fellow Cuban exiles or tourists. Among the Cubans Heredia encountered, they were "restless to leave the United States for any Spanish-speaking territory not under Spanish Rule." Even though he did not manage to pierce the literary spheres of North America (at the time), his two years spent in exile in the United States are increasingly critical with regard to his major works. His love for liberty grew as he discovered in his travels here the rewarding activity of free men; as he learned to read in English and imitate the prose of his US-American literary counterparts. Also, the nature found throughout North America, especially Niagara Falls, played a huge role in his most influential and famous works. His time spent in exile in the United States aided in forming a community of readers that also experienced the same thing.

== Romanticism ==
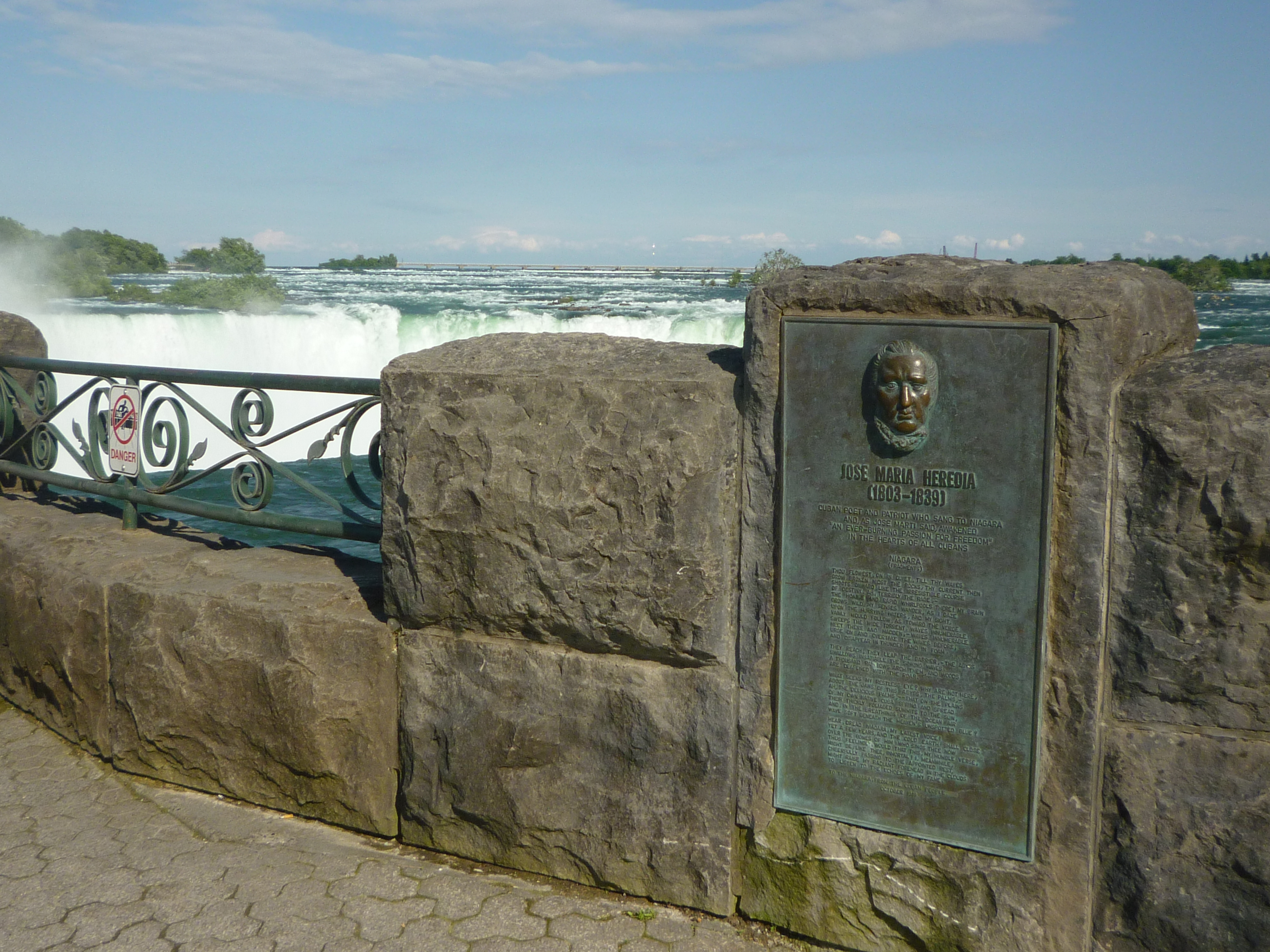
Monument to Heredia at the Niagara falls. The text "Cuban poet, exiled patriot called the sublime singer of the wonderous greatness of Niagara falls." is inscribed at the monument.

José María Heredia spent many years in exile in the United States and Mexico, away from his homeland, Cuba. Many of his poems, for he was a prominent poet, reflect a mixture of tropical sensuality and dreamy melancholy, which are often inspired by his homesickness. The force and beauty of nature and the focus on individuality emerges strongly in his poems. Latin American Romanticism contains many qualities, all of which can be found in Heredia's most popular poems.

"Elements in thought, style, manner that are typical of Romanticism in the humanities, and especially in literature, are: (1) a focus on the individual; (2) a dedication to personal and political liberty and freedom; (3) passion in terms of emotions and the expression of individuality that may include suffering; (4) appreciation for and treatment of new subject matters in art and ideas that include extremes such as the sublime or the ideal on the one hand and the ugly or grotesque on the other hand; (5) lyricism in music and poetry including melodramatic personal styles and melodrama in the theater or drama; (6) foregrounding of sensitivity (la sensibilidad; lo sensible) to nature, the poor and the sick, etc.; and (7) discovery or inclusion in the humanities of what traditional Latin American society, which had been dominated by culture from France, Spain, and Portugal, had been seen as exotic (i.e., coming from Asia, Oceania, or the Middle East, etc.)."

It has been said that "if the United States had Walt Whitman and Edgar Allan Poe, Latin America had the Cuban poet Heredia" in regards to the prominence and literary importance of his poetry. Being compared to the great [North] American writers of the Romantic Movement shows who his work was characterized by the stylings of romanticism. His Romanticism is that of the search and longing for freedom, both political and literary. To this extent, his poetry comes directly from his life.

== Important works ==
"En el Teocalli de Cholula" ("On the Teocalli of Cholula" in English) and "Niagara" are his most important poems. His poetry lasts both because of the subject matter and for the intensely personal feeling in the works. Nature is clearly depicted in the fashion of the Romantic Era and mirrors his spiritual and emotional states. Nature acts as his freedom. In these poems, the poet praises the natural beauty of both Americas. The most prominent Romantic feature in Heredia is the ever-present involvement of his life in his poetry as well as the dark notes of death, melancholy and gloominess that pervade his writings.

=== "On the Teocalli of Cholula" ===
Heredia's fascination with the Aztec Ruins is immensely contingent with the thematics of Romanticism. Representative of the ghostly past, it calls forth a feeling of death and mystery of the Romantic Era. Written after the death of his father in Mexico, a lyrical voice experiences the melancholy of watching the sunset over the fields of the valley of Anahuac, and after, reflecting on the disappearance of the pyramid builders and how the times have changed.

=== "Niagara" ===
Niagara Falls was easily made accessible to the public thanks to the completion of the Erie Canal in 1825. Its existence attracted national and foreign romantics to witness in awe this spectacle of the forces of nature. Heredia stood in great wonder and "projected his anguished sentiments into its powerful flow and fall and swirl." The "Niágara" was originally published in Heredia's first collection, entitled Poesías, published in New York, 1825. The theme of a fissure or split in the relationship between subject and object appears in "Niágara" to coincide with his feelings of split or torn between countries.

== Editions ==
With the exception of a few isolated poems, Heredia's work has not been translated into English. Among the many Spanish-language editions stands out the critical edition of Heredia's poetry by Tilmann Altenberg, Poesías completas de José María Heredia (Madrid/Frankfurt: Iberoamericana/Vervuert, 2020).
