= National Masonic Temple of Cuba =

Headquarters building of the Grand Lodge of Cuba

- Gran Templo Nacional Masónico
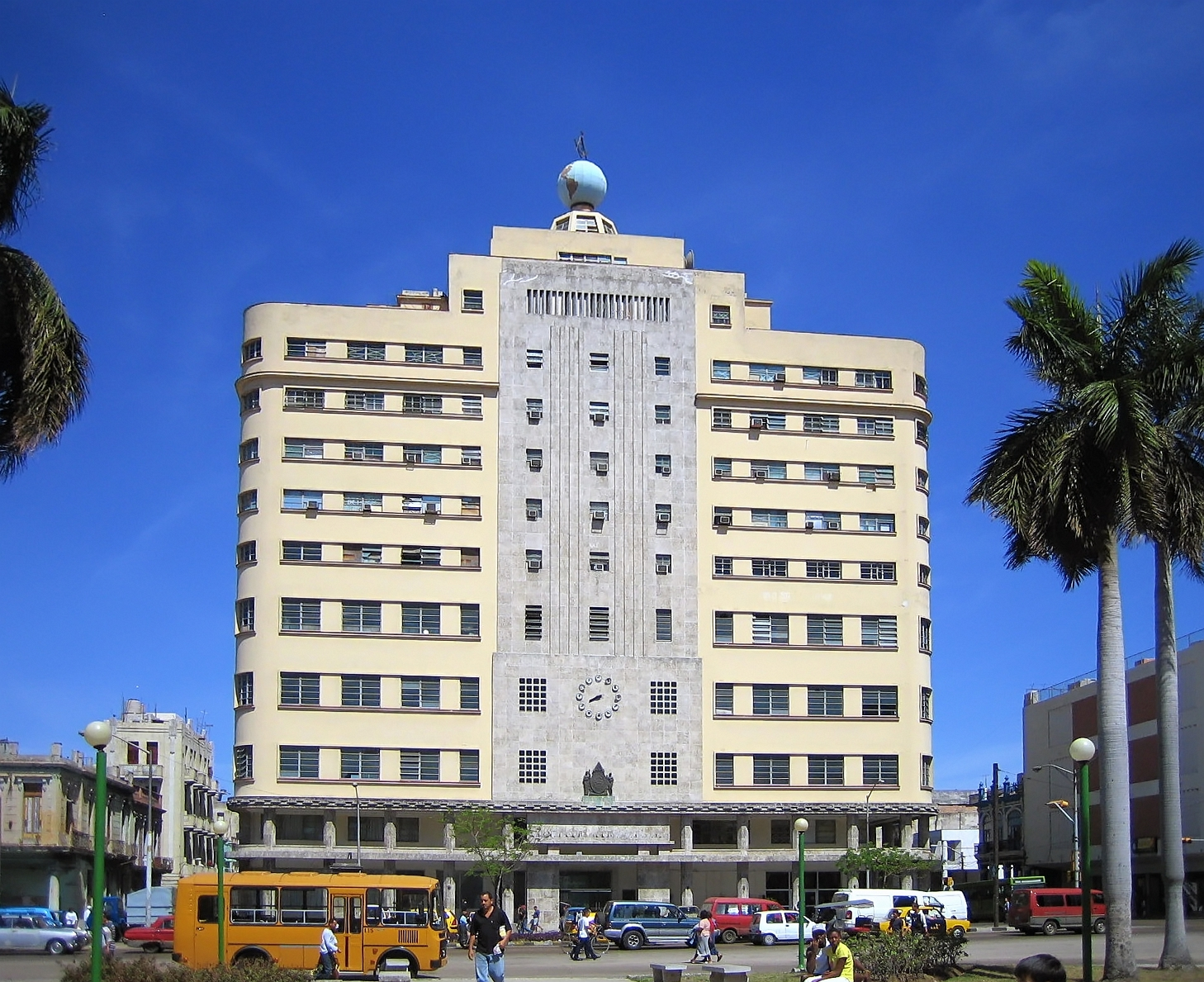
- Interactive map of the National Masonic Temple of Cuba area

General information
- Architectural style: Art Deco; Streamline Moderne
- Location: 508 Avenida Salvador Allende, Centro Habana, Havana, Cuba
- Coordinates: 23°07′56″N 82°22′12″W
- Current tenants: Grand Lodge of Cuba; Post Office of Cuba; Cuban Government
- Groundbreaking: Groundbreaking: Early 1951; Cornerstone: March 25, 1951
- Inaugurated: February 27, 1955
- Cost: USD $4,000,000
- Owner: Grand Lodge of Cuba

Technical details
- Floor count: 11
- Lifts/elevators: 2

Design and construction
- Architect: Emilio Vasconcelos Frayde
- Developer: Carlos M. Piñeiro del Cueto

Other information
- Public transit: Bus: Havana Metrobus Esquina Belascoin

The National Masonic Temple of Cuba (Spanish: Gran Templo Nacional Masónico), also known as the Grand National Masonic Temple of the Most Respectable Grand Lodge and Supreme Council of Cuba of Ancient and Accepted Freemasons, is the headquarters building of the Grand Lodge of Cuba in Centro Habana. It holds two Masonic Temples, conference rooms, a grand conference hall, the offices of the Grand Master of the Grand Lodge and the Grand Commander of the Supreme Council, and the National Museum of Freemasonry.

== History ==
=== Former Grand Lodge headquarters building ===
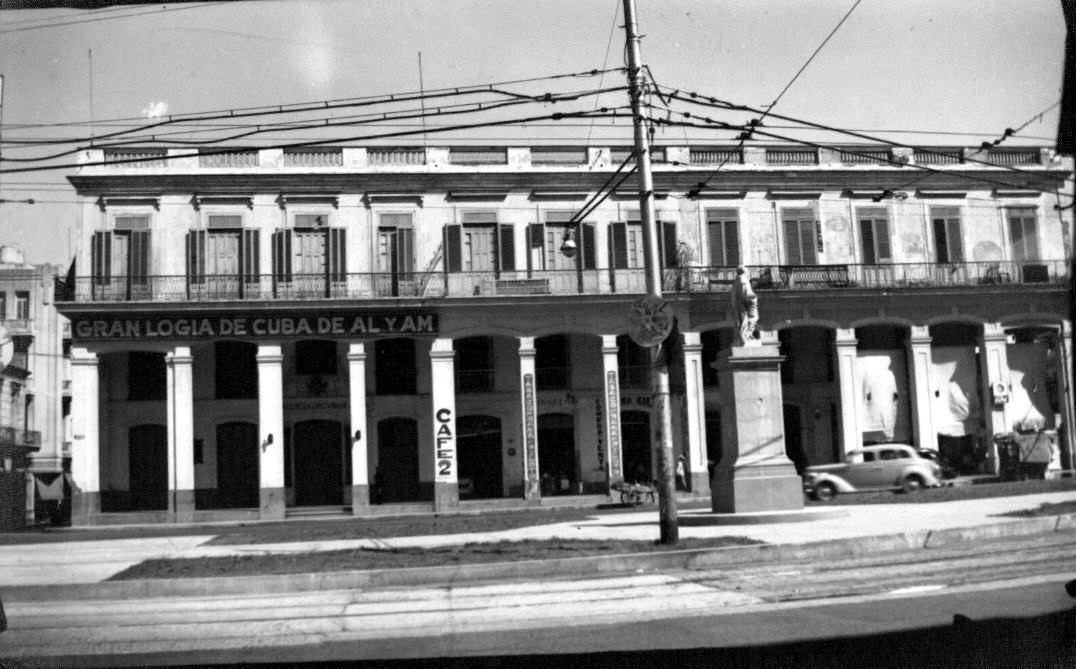
The Grand Lodge of Cuba was headquartered in this building from 1908 to 1951. It was one of three buildings that were demolished to make room for the new construction.

The Republic of Cuba was birthed in 1902. Its first serving President, Tomás Estrada Palma, was a prominent Freemason who had taken charge of his new country from Leonard Wood, also a Freemason. José Fernández Pellón was the Grand Master of the Grand Lodge of Cuba at the time. That year saw the first discussions within the Grand Lodge of Cuba about acquiring a headquarters building to align with their newly granted independent and national character, free from Spanish or American imperial dominance.

After the Grand Lodge established an Upper House with legislative function to write Masonic Law, and several commissions to deal with functionary procedures, they actively looked for land to acquire to accommodate their expanding footprint. The building they desired would not only be a meeting space and office building, but would function as an emblem of power projection to the rest of the Freemasonic world. The Grand Master at the time wrote that it would be:

"A building that, upon mere sight, will be a pronouncement to every foreign brother that in this Republic, there exists the same institution to which he belongs in Pennsylvania or Scotland, and that its members here have the same enthusiasm, equal fervor, identical aspirations and tendencies."

Word soon reached the Grand Lodge that the Jesuits, a brotherhood of whom the Cuban Freemasons had a longstanding rivalry, had purchased a property along Calle Reina, and were hoping to expand down the street beyond Calle Belascoaín, where Calle Reina turned into Avenida Carlos III (English: Carlos III Avenue). The Jesuits and the Freemasons in this era, because their orders were so similar, were constantly looking for ways to out-do one another. The Jesuits' hope had been to build a grand cathedral there, and they were actively negotiating purchase deals with the intersection's land and building owners. The Grand Secretariat moved to preempt the Jesuits and purchased the land at a much higher price, halting the Jesuits development at Belascoaín.

This effort put the Grand Lodge in a precarious financial situation, and they needed to ask for assistance from outside of Cuba. Later in 1902, the Grand Lodge of New York wired them US$5,000 as Masonic Aid.

In 1905, the Grand Lodge established the Commission on the National Masonic Temple, which would meet on a regular basis to develop the plans and raise the capitol for the project. Their efforts were temporarily interrupted by internal strifes caused by the Little August War and the imposition of the Provisional Government of Cuba. In 1908, the Grand Lodge purchased a building at the corner of Avenida Carlos III and Calle Santiago (English: Santiago Street), and the Grand Lodge moved in. Initially, they wanted to purchase all three buildings that made up the block and tear them down for a new construction, but they could not secure the purchase of the other two buildings. From 1908 to 1951, the Grand Lodge of Cuba was headquartered in this building.

The church that the Jesuits were planning on building here needed to relocate a few hundred meters away on Calle Reina, where in 1923, they opened Reina Church (also known as the Church of the Sacred Heart of Jesus and Saint Ignacio de Loyola).

In 1929, President Gerardo Machado, the Grand Inspector of the Grand Lodge of Cuba at the time, negotiated with his Presidential Cabinet, the Congress of Cuba, and Antonio Bosch Martínez, the former Mayor of Regla, for the Cuban government to donate a plot of land valued at $MN300,000 to the Grand Lodge. The Grand Lodge's total income that year only amounted to $MN70,659.43. The Cuban government's official stated reason for ceding the land was in: "...official recognition by the Republic of Cuba of our National Freemasonry for its relevant services to the emancipatory and libertarian ideals of this people." At the time of the land cession, that plot of land had been occupied by the University of Havana Medical School, and the former cavalry barracks of the Spanish Civil Guard. The University Medical School relocated elsewhere in the city.

As part of the land cession agreement, the Grand Lodge of Cuba promised that they would open a public library and a secular public school.

In 1945, the Grand Lodge was able to purchase another adjacent property, which was then donated to them by the Cuban government.

In 1948, the Grand Lodge was able to secure the full block lying at the cross sections of those streets that were once called Calle Belascoaín, Avenida Carlos III, Calle Fraternidad, and Calle Pocito. Now with the footprint required for their dream of a Grand Temple that would be "a guiding light for the world," they attempted to begin demolition efforts. The tenants of their newly acquired buildings refused to move, and it took until 1951 for the Grand Lodge to reach hefty settlement negotiations with the residents and businesses.

=== Construction and inauguration ===
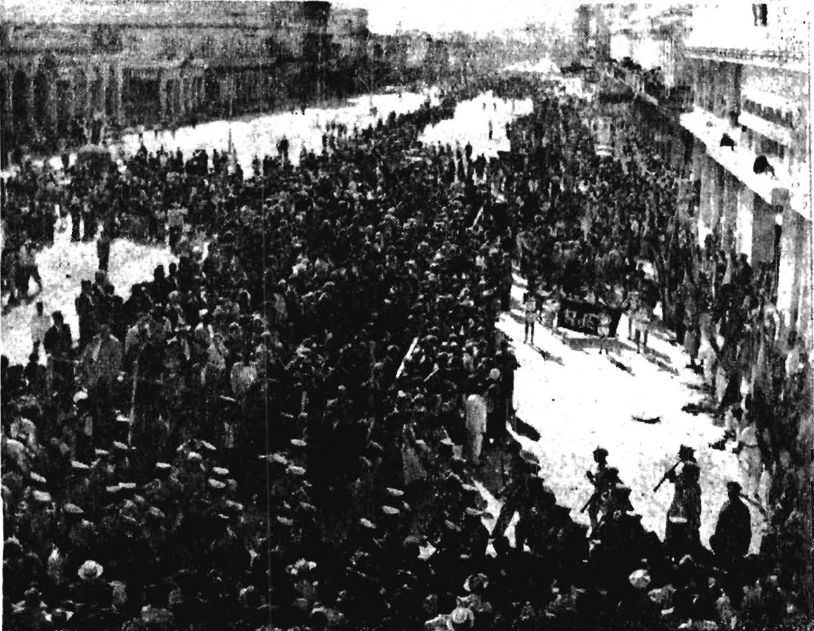
40,000 people lined the street to watch the parade on the day that this building was opened, and 25,000 Freemasons from around the world marched in it.

Groundbreaking occurred some time in early 1951, and the street address for the new building project became #508 Avenida de Carlos III. To level the ground beneath the Temple, loads of soil and sand were brought in from each of the Six Provinces of Cuba and many of their major rivers; Camagüey Province, Havana Province, Las Villas Province, Matanzas Province, Oriente Province, and Pinar del Río Province.

The building's cornerstone was laid on March 25, 1951, by Grand Master Carlos M. Piñero y del Cueto and the building's architect, Emilio Vasconcelos Frayde.

On February 25, 1955, delegations from around the world arrived at José Martí International Airport for the Third InterAmerican Conference on Symbolic Freemasonry.

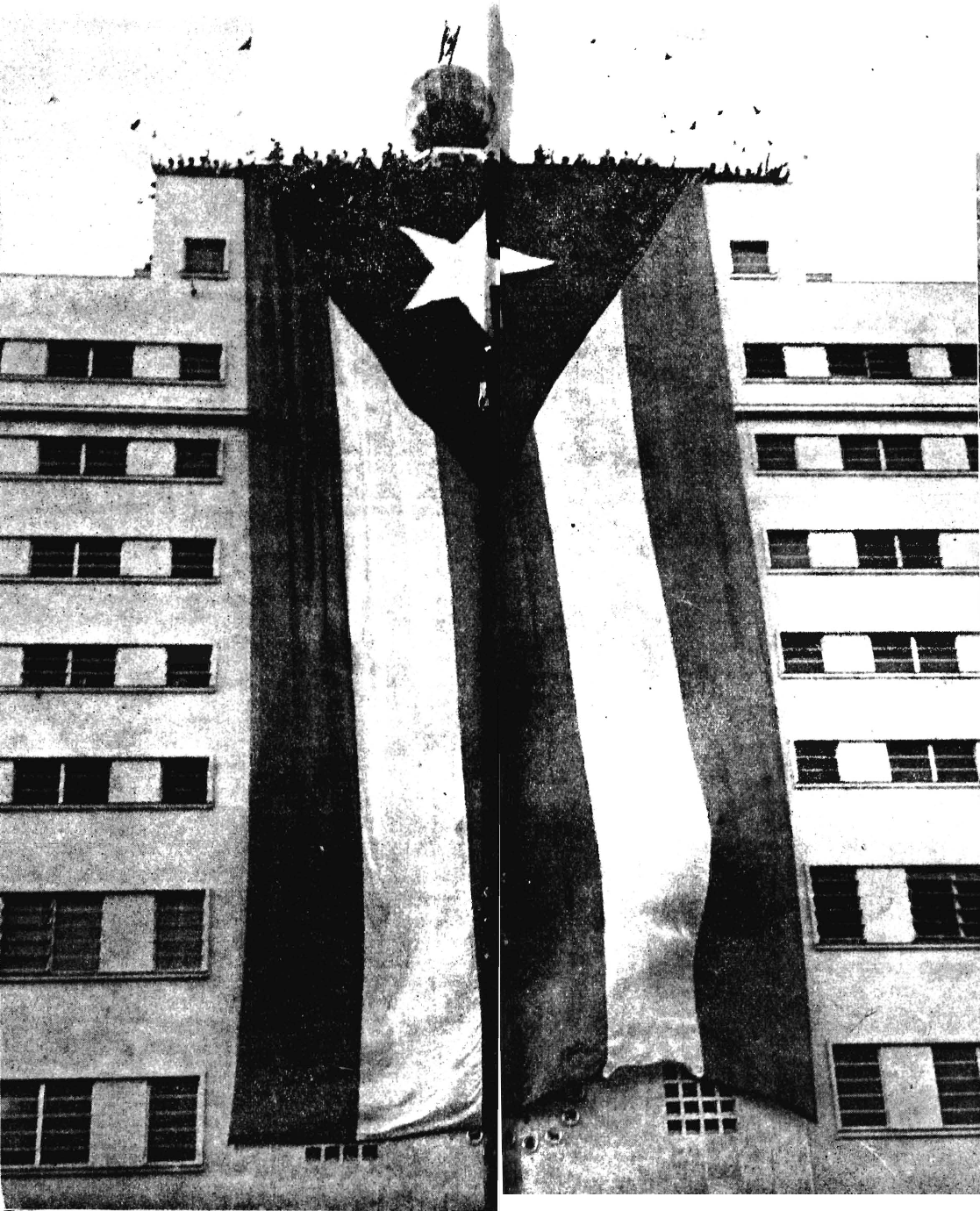
Just before the building officially opened, youth members of the local AJEF unfurled what was called a "colossal" 30 meter Cuban flag, which had been donated by the AJEF HQ.

On February 27, 1955, after a grand parade, the National Masonic Temple of Cuba was officially inaugurated during a consecration ceremony. At the consecration ceremony, Grand Master Carlos M. Piñeiro del Cueto said: "The consecration of the National Masonic Temple stands as a bulwark in the struggle for the freedom of all peoples and the dignity of mankind."

A delegate from the Grand Lodge of Pennsylvania, upon seeing the Temple, wrote: "The cost of the temple was approximately US$4,000,000, and when we realize that there are but 31,700 Masons in Cuba, one can fully realize what a magnificent undertaking was brought to completion." Revista Bohemia, however, wrote at the time that the cost was only $MN2,500,000. This discrepancy aside, the majority of the project was covered through major financial contributions and donations by Freemasons all over Cuba, and the Daughters of Acacia.

At a height of eleven floors, it was at one time the second-tallest building on the entire island of Cuba.

On the day that it was inaugurated, two floors were already being rented-out to businesses unrelated to Freemasonry. The tenth floor acted as the law offices of the law firm owned by the Grand Master, and to avoid commingling, when he needed to do business as a lawyer, he would sit in his office on the tenth floor, but when he needed to act as the Grand Master, he would walk upstairs to the Office of the Grand Master. Four other floors were designated as private offices to be rented to other businesses or organizations in Havana, the income from which would help recoup the costs for the building, and for the future planned charity work of the Grand Lodge.

When it opened, the Grand Lodge was not the only body that used the space. 35 Masonic Lodges also held meetings regularly in the building, which was about 5,000 Freemasons in and out of the building every week just for Lodge meetings.

Grand Master Carlos M. Piñeiro del Cueto said:

“This latest work has been so extraordinarily effective that we have also been visited by the Grand Masters of Germany, China, and the Philippines. From the Third Conference, we expect significant agreements to make Freemasonry's action in defense of democracy and freedom more effective.”

=== Modern era ===
With the success of the Cuban Revolution, the Communist Party of Cuba took control over the building for a brief time. While the entire building has never been entirely occupied by Freemasons in its history, after the Revolution, they were unable to rent-out the unoccupied floors to various businesses due to the Marxist-style of Communist society that Fidel Castro wanted to install in Cuba. Where before the Revolution, the unoccupied floors were rented to businesses, after the Revolution, they became occupied by various departments of the government of Cuba, including the Post Office of Cuba.

Around the turn of the century, the rotating globe on the top of the building stopped spinning. For fifteen years it would not spin, but in 2015, during the time of the Cuban thaw, Lázaro Faustino Cuesta Valdés was elected Grand Master of the Grand Lodge of Cuba, and he hired the prominent Cuban electric company Vanguardia Socialista, and the electricians Ramón Eurípides Osorio Cabrera, Alexis Domínguez, Jorge Luis Arrebato, and Denis Caballero, to fix it. They cleaned the cables and wires, replaced gear mechanisms, and modernized the 1950's motor. On March 23, 2016, the globe started spinning again.

== Gallery ==
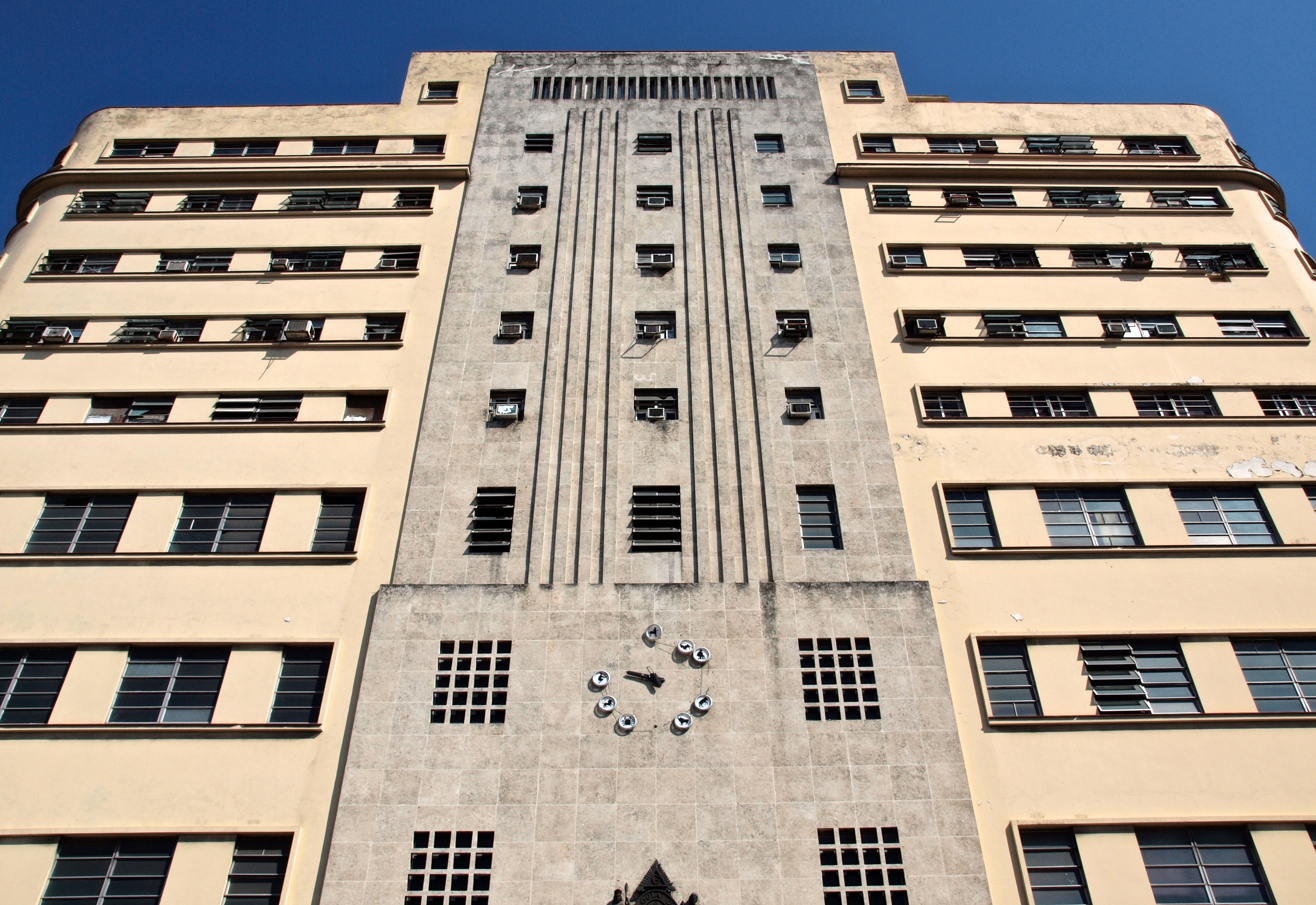
Built at the height of the Cuban Art Deco movement, during the Streamline Moderne era.

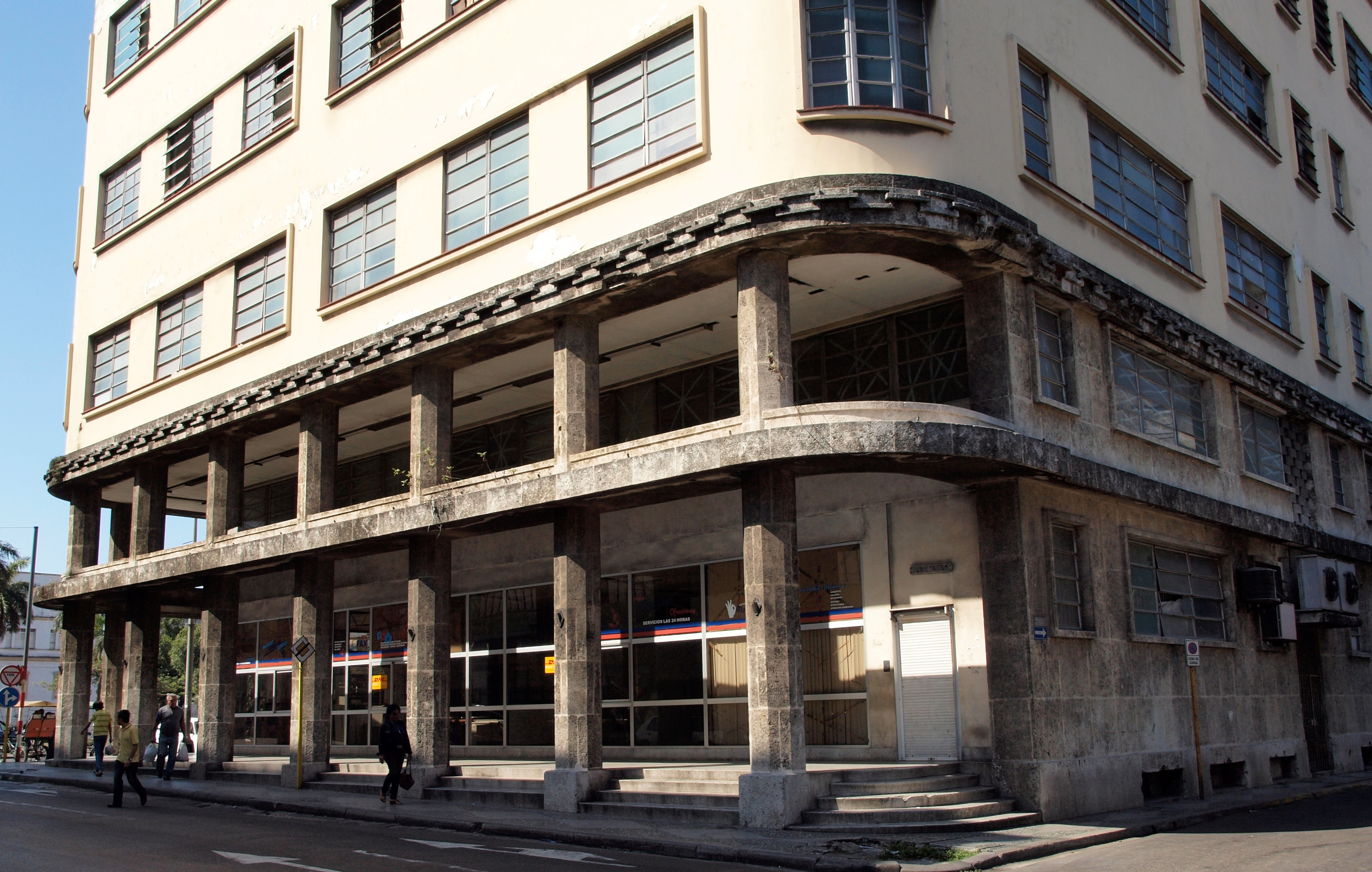
At the corner of Avenida Salvador Allende and Padre Varela Street, the Masonic Temple is at one of the busiest intersections in Havana.

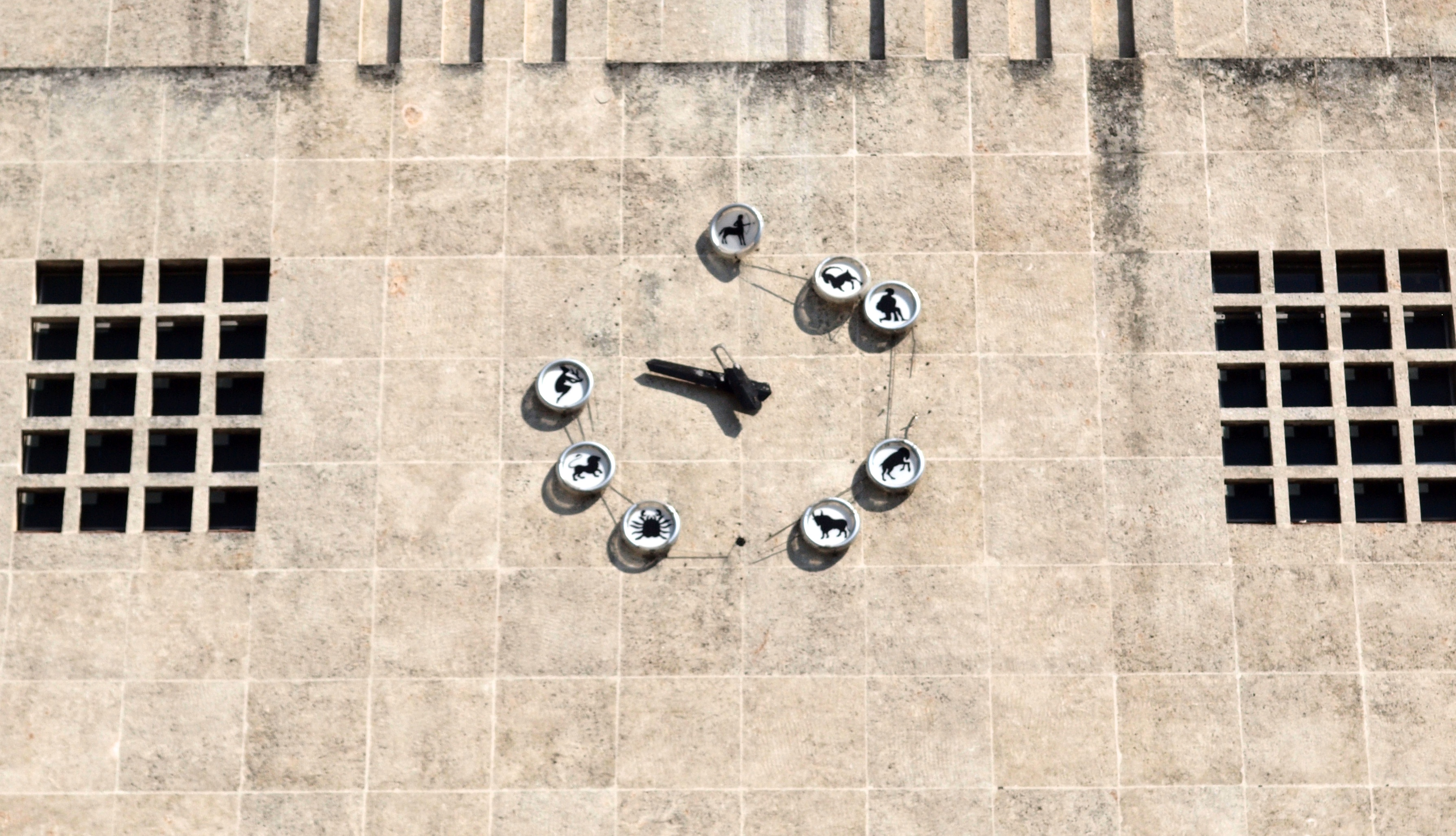
Clockface on the edifice.

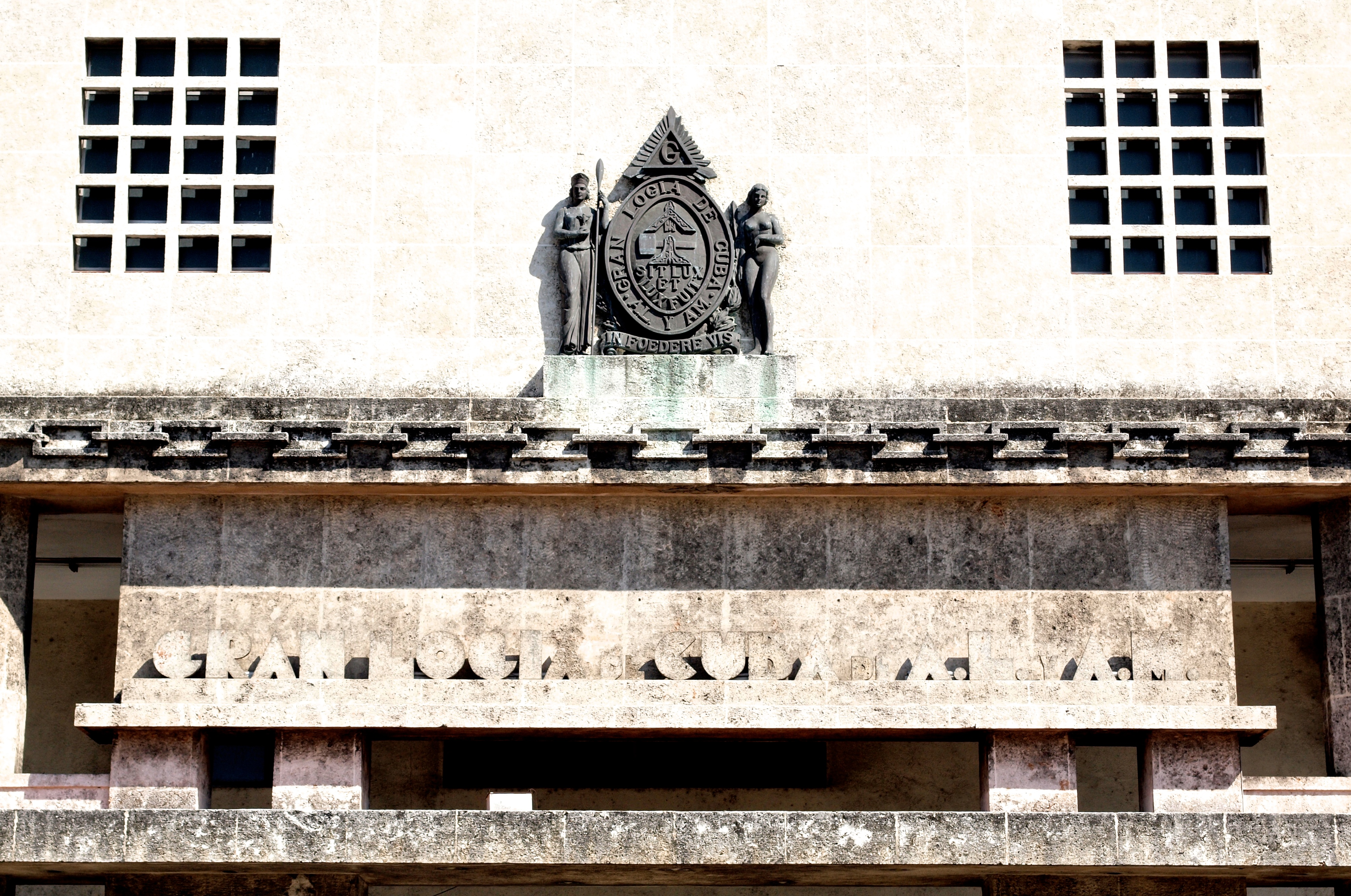
The Coat of Arms rests above the name of the Grand Lodge of Cuba, carved into stone.

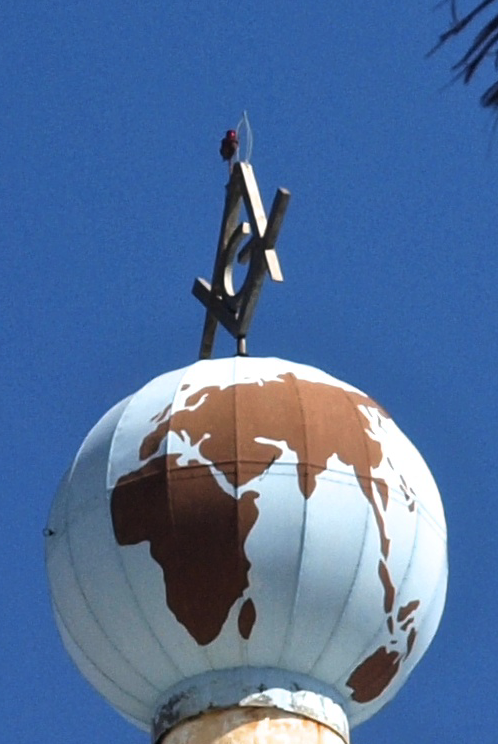
Distinctive Globe and Square and Compass. The globe spins, powered by a 1950's General Electric three phase motor.

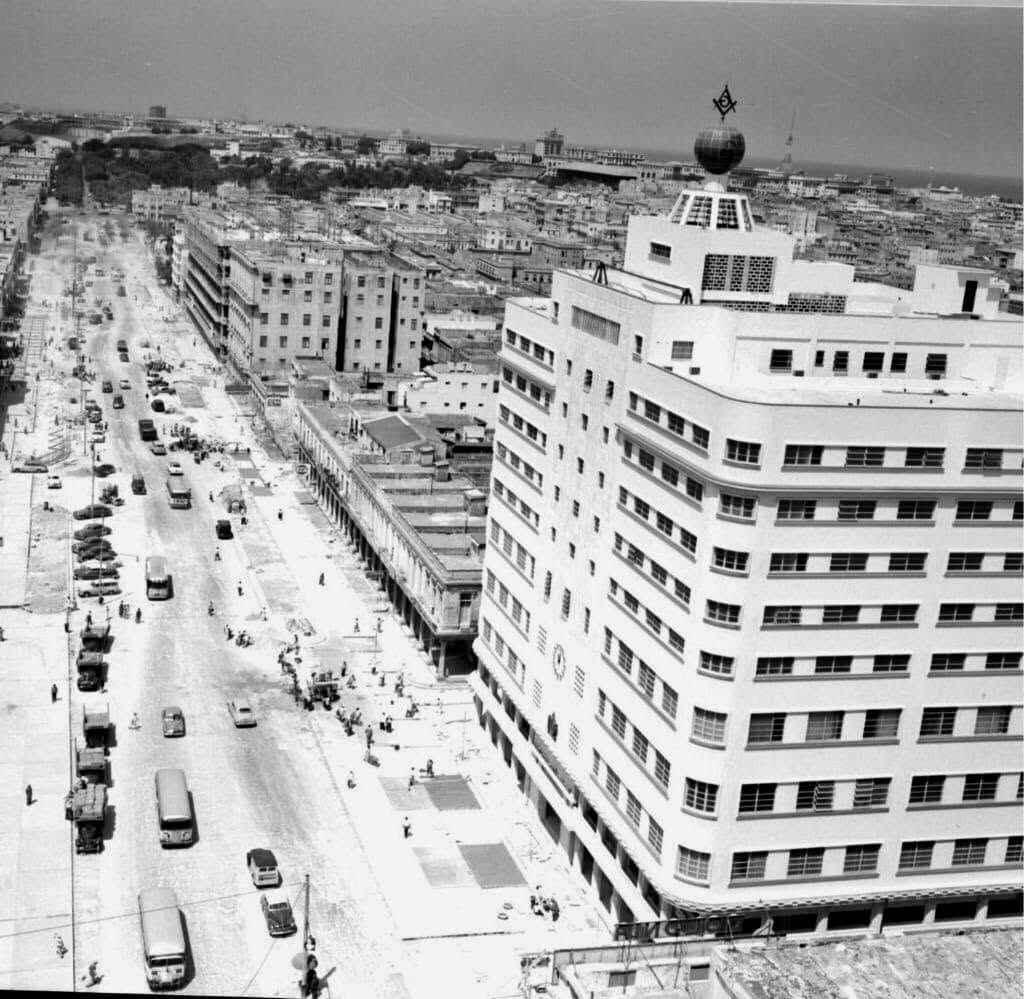
View of the Havana skyline circa 1954, the year before inauguration.

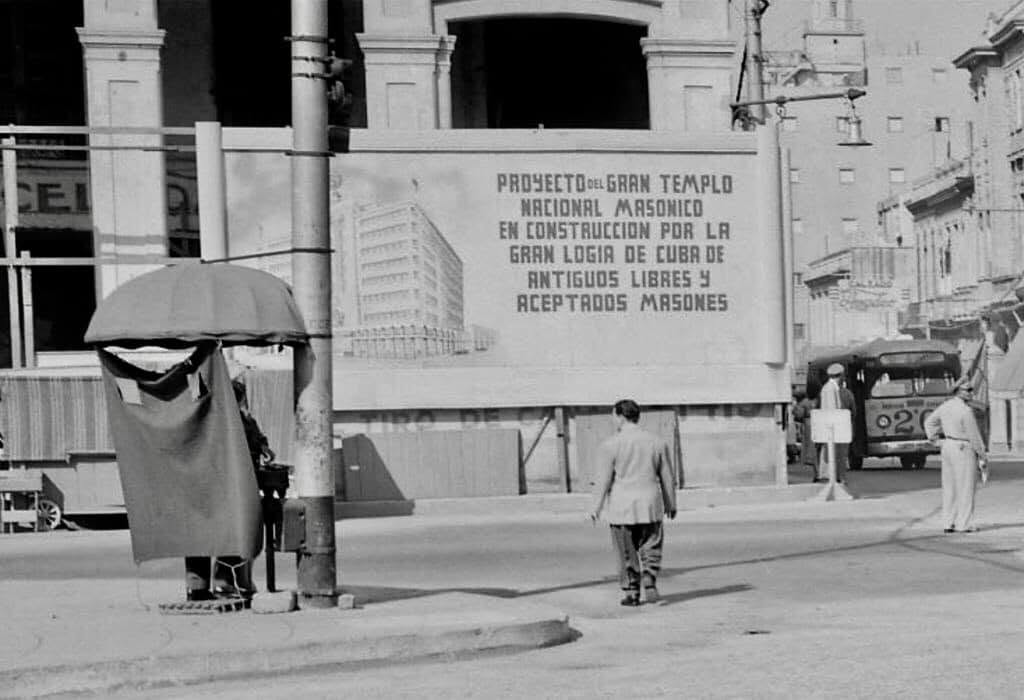
The building's cornerstone was laid on March 25, 1951.

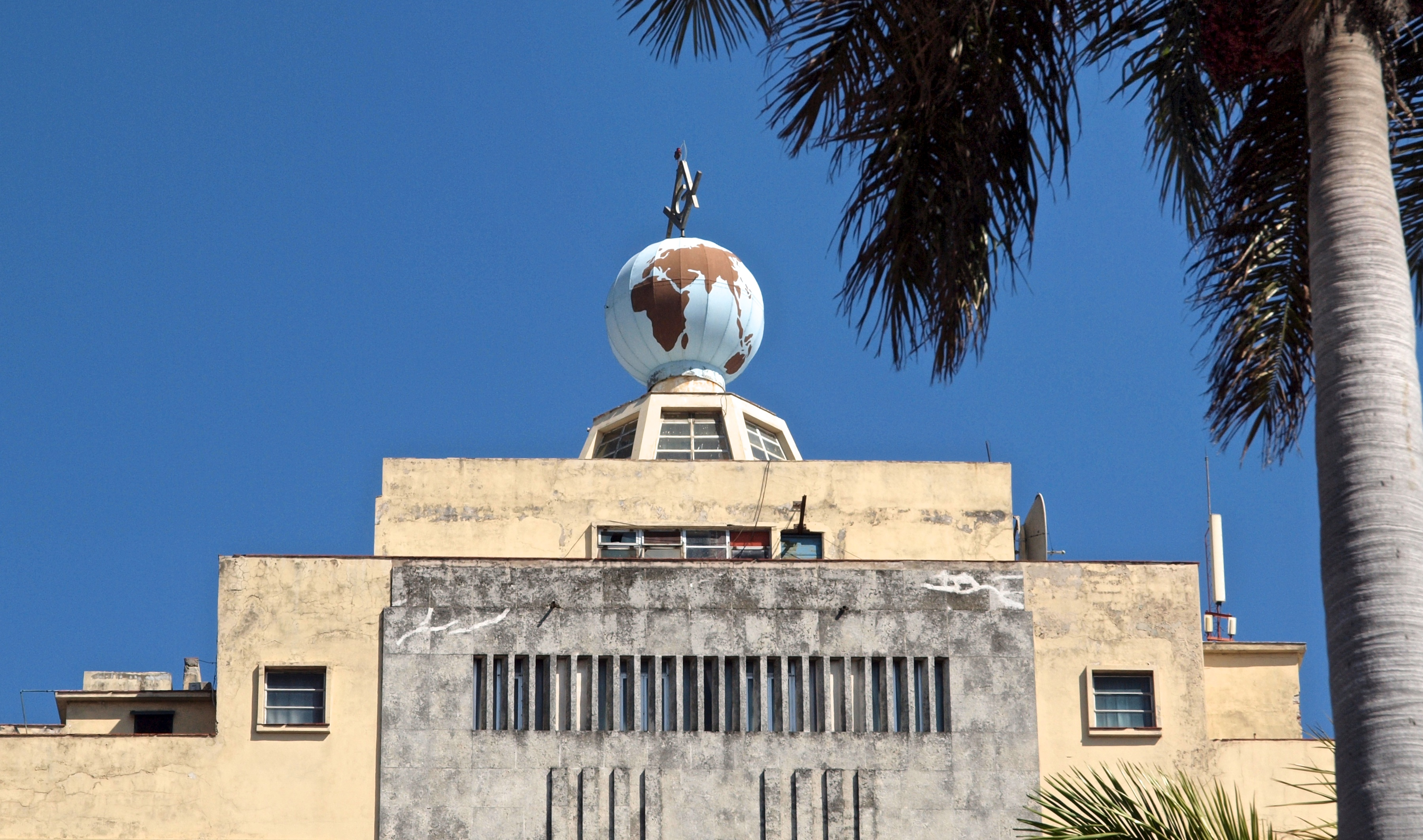
At one point, the Masonic Temple was the second-tallest building on the island of Cuba.

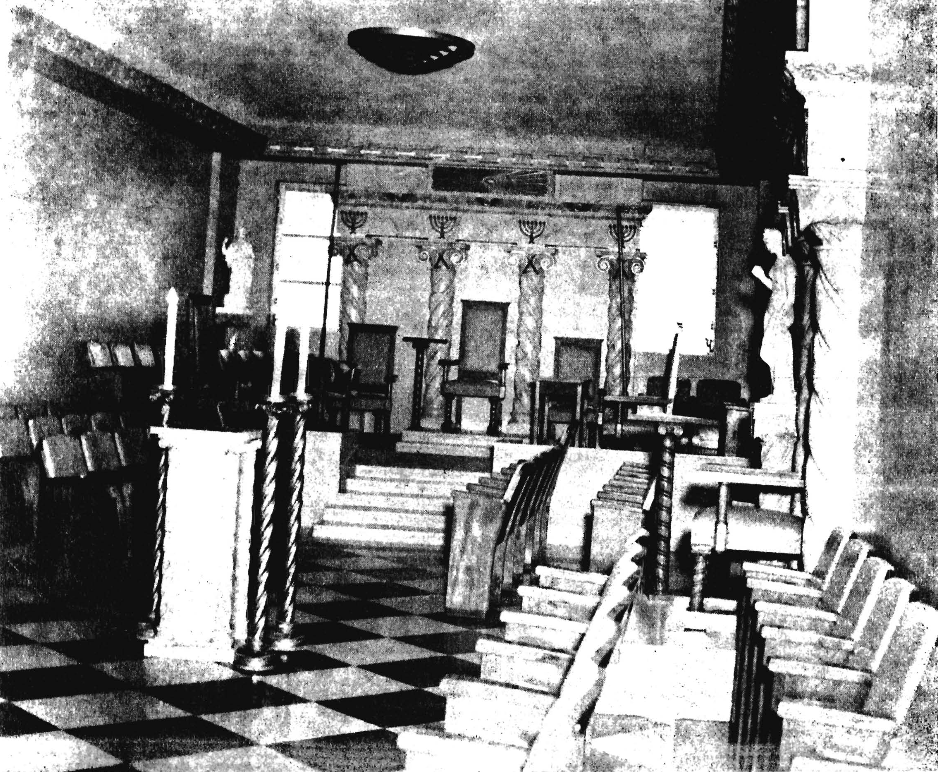
Ionic Temple

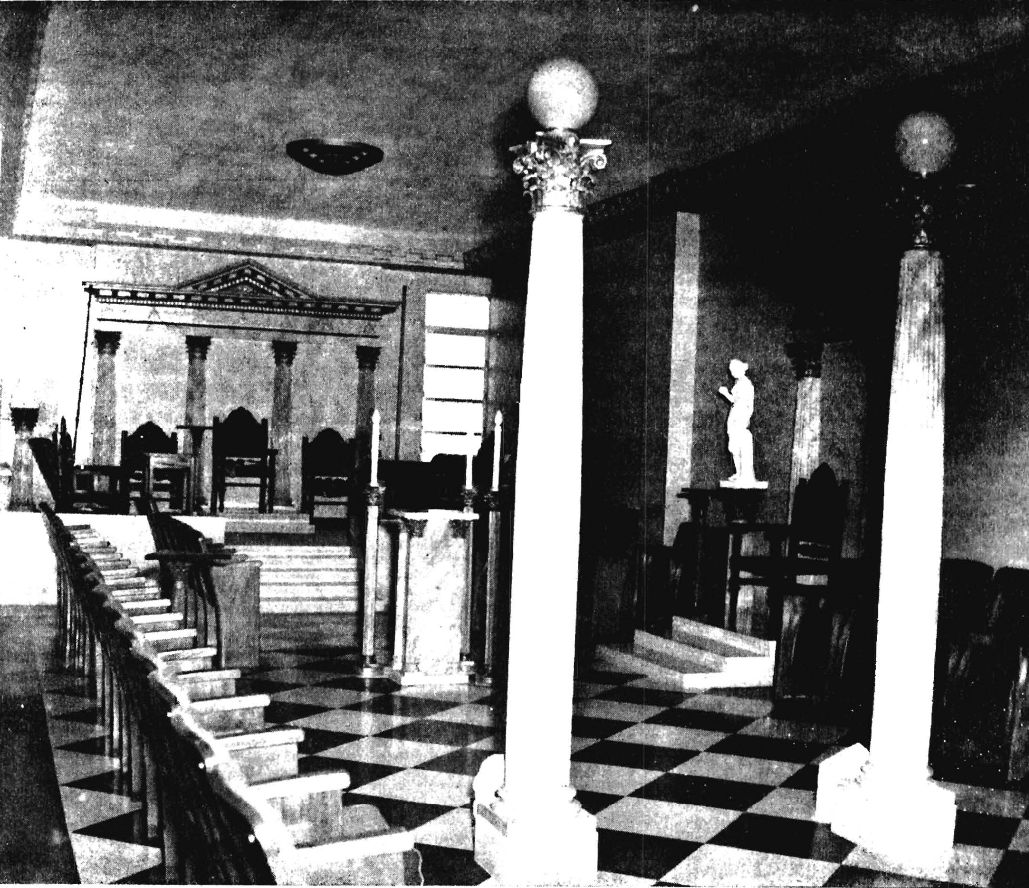
Corinthian Temple

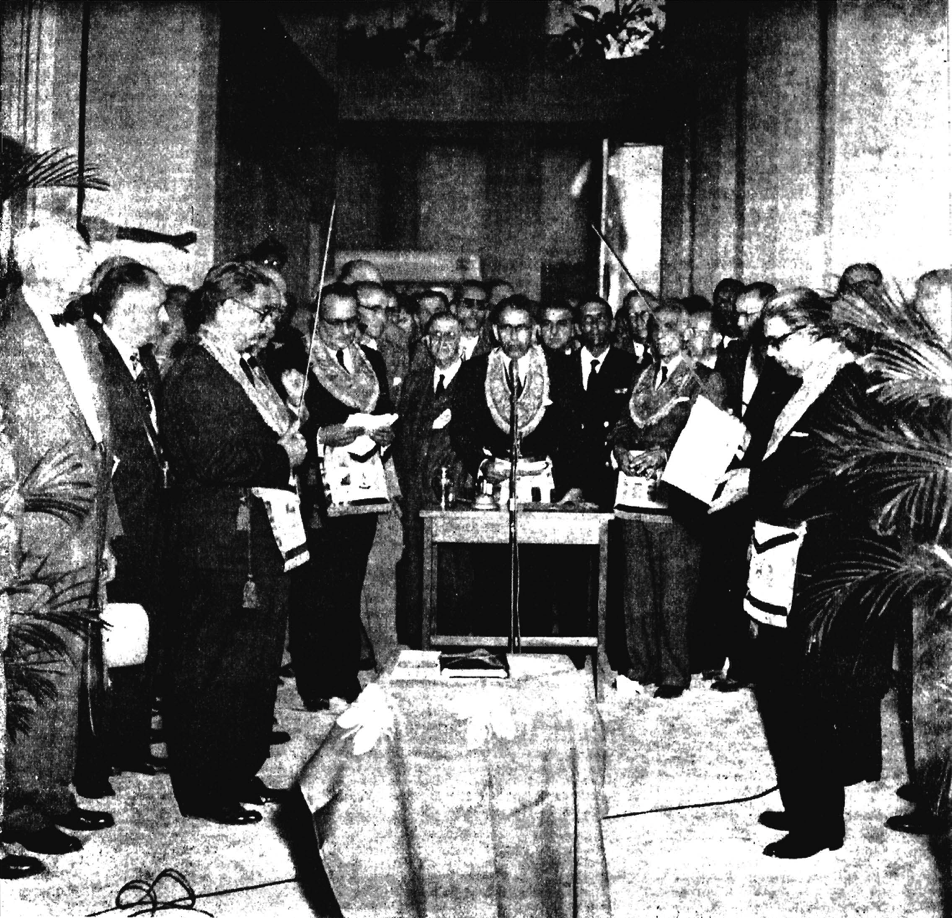
Inauguration and consecration ceremony.

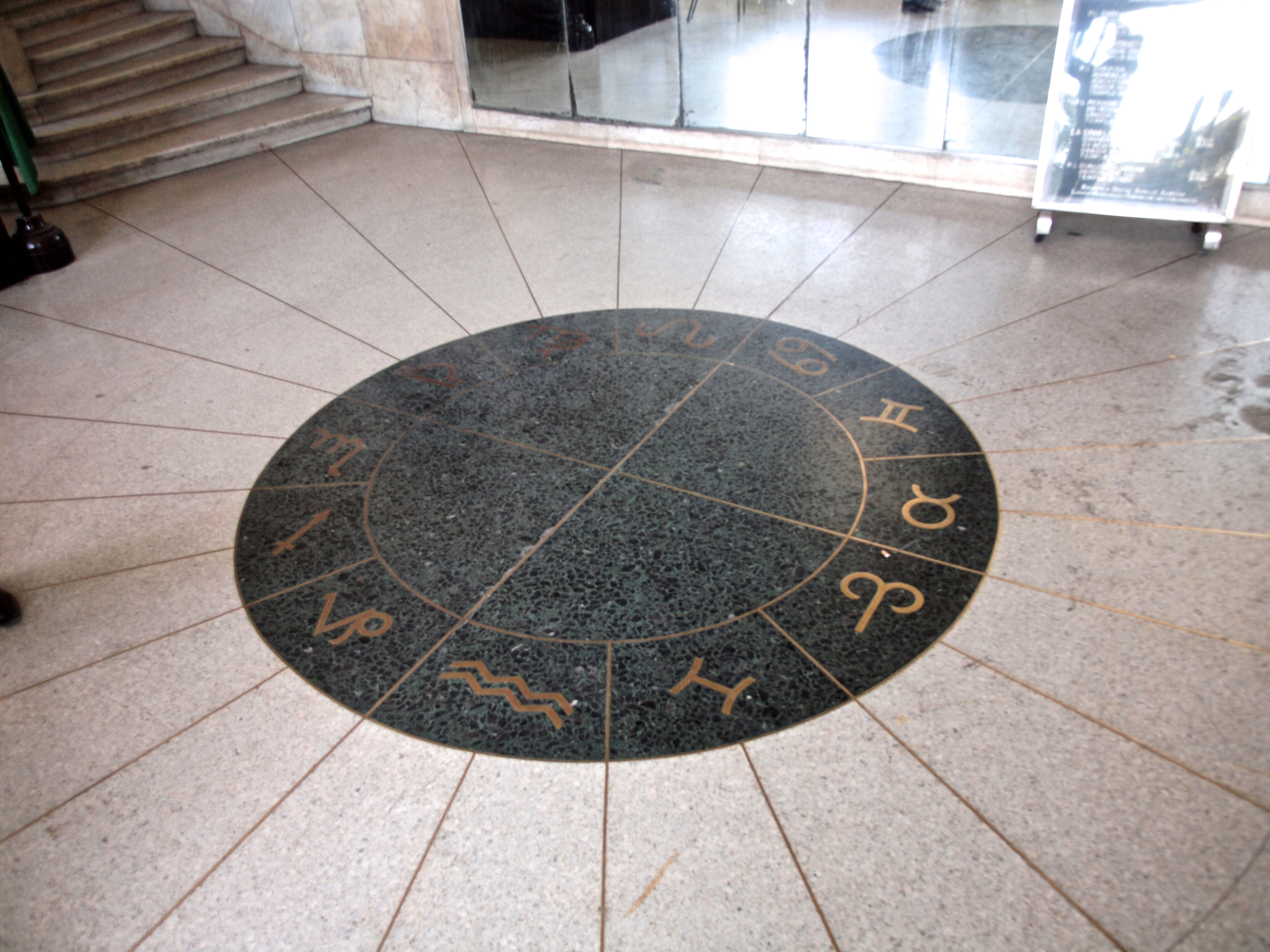
Seal on the floor of the entrance to the Great Hall.
