= Deities and personifications of seasons =

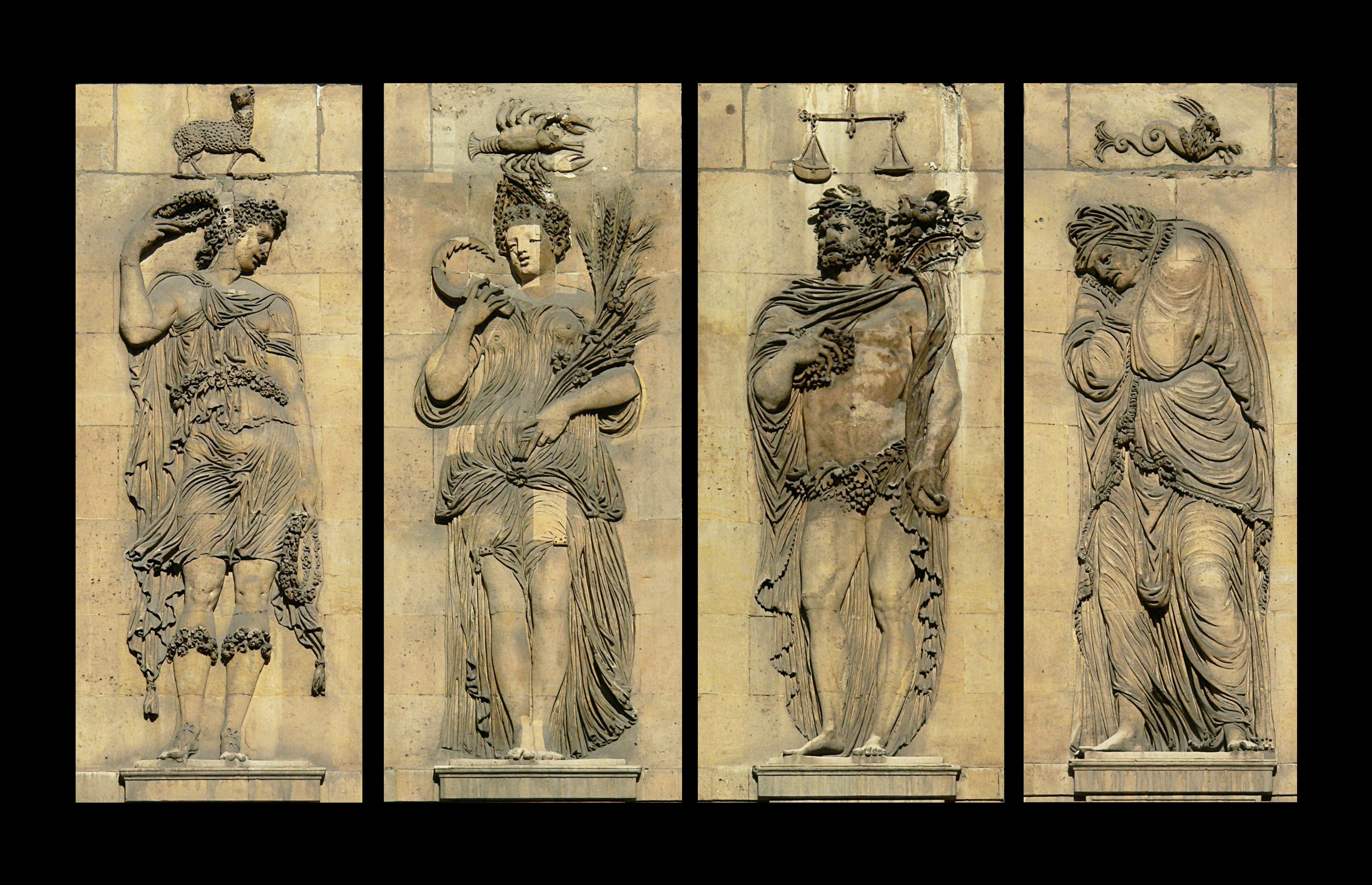
Jean Goujon, The Four Seasons, reliefs on the Hôtel Carnavalet, Paris, c. 1550s.

There are a number of deities and personifications associated with seasons in various mythologies, traditions, and fiction.

== Winter ==
- Beira, Queen of Winter, also Cailleach Bheur, a personification or deity of winter in Gaelic mythology
- Boreas (Βορέας, Boréas; also Βορρᾶς, Borrhás) was the Greek god of the cold north wind and the bringer of winter. His name meant "North Wind" or "Devouring One". His name gives rise to the adjective "boreal".
- Ded Moroz (literally "Grandfather Frost"), a Russian substitute of Santa Claus
- Itztlacoliuhqui, deified personification of winter-as-death in Aztecan mythology
- Jack Frost
- Tengliu, Snow goddess from Chinese mythology.
- the Great Winter God (冬大神), of Ba Jia Jiang (The Eight Generals), originated from the Chinese folk beliefs and myths
- Marzanna, slavic Goddess of Winter, Death, and Rebirth (also Marena, Morena, Morana, Mara, Maslenitsa).
- Morozko, from a Russian fairy tale, translated as Father Frost
- Old Man Winter, personification of winter.
- Frau Holle Germanic mother frost.
- Skaði (sometimes anglicized as Skadi, Skade, or Skathi) is a jötunn and goddess associated with bowhunting, skiing, winter, and mountains in Norse mythology
- Three Friends of Winter in Chinese art: the plum, bamboo, and pine.
- Nane Sarma, Grandma Frost, Iranian folklore.
- General Winter, personification of Winter as a contributing factor to defeat of invading military forces

== Spring ==
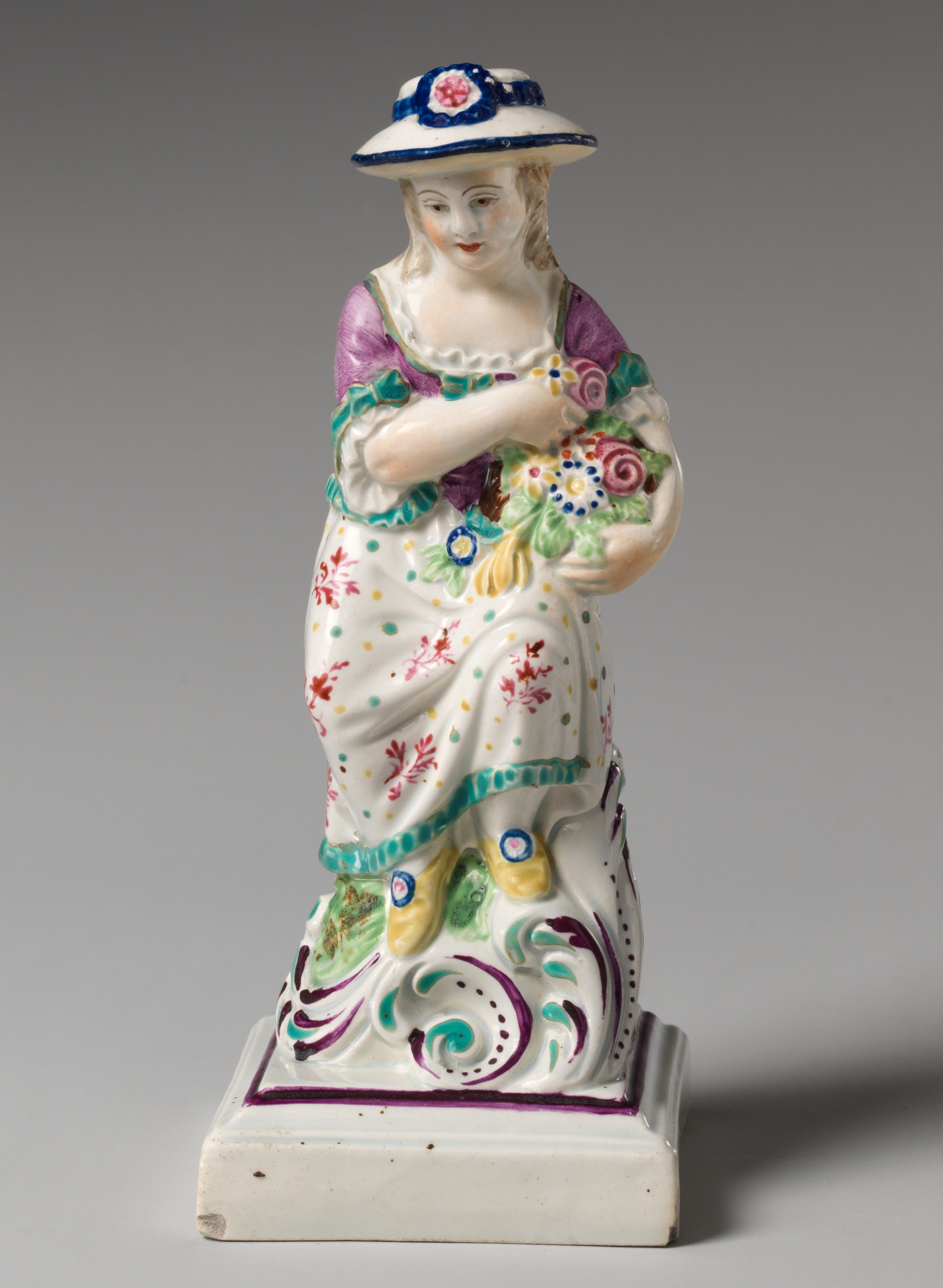
Staffordshire figure of Spring, from a set of the Four Seasons, Neale & Co, c. 1780, 5 1/2 in. (14 cm)

- Ēostre, West Germanic spring goddess; she is the namesake of the festival of Easter in some languages.
- Brigid, celtic Goddess of Fire, the Home, poetry and the end of winter. Her festival, Imbolc, is on 1st or 2nd of February which marks "the return of the light".
- Persephone, Greek Goddess of Spring. Her festival or the day she returns to her mother Demeter from the Underworld is on 3rd of April.
- Many fertility deities are also associated with spring
- May Queen, British personification of May Day and springtime.
- In Roman mythology, Flora was a Sabine-derived goddess of flowers and of the season of spring
- Jarylo (Cyrillic: Ярило or Ярила; Polish: Jaryło; Croatian: Jura or Juraj; Serbian: Jarilo; Slavic: Jarovit), alternatively Yarylo, Iarilo, or Gerovit, is a Slavic god of vegetation, fertility and springtime.
- the great Spring God (春大神), of Ba Jia Jiang (The Eight Generals), originated from the Chinese folk beliefs and myths
- Zephyrus, the Greek god of the mild west wind, associated with spring

== Summer ==
- Áine, Irish goddess of love, summer, wealth and sovereignty, associated with the sun and midsummer
- the Great Summer God (夏大神), of Ba Jia Jiang (The Eight Generals), originated from the Chinese folk beliefs and myths
- Freyr, Norse god of summer, sunlight, life and rain

== Autumn ==
- the Great Autumn God (秋大神), of Ba Jia Jiang (The Eight Generals), originated from the Chinese folk beliefs and myths
- Opora : Minor greek goddess connected to fruit, the harvest, especially wine harvest, and the season of autumn
- Sharada : One of the most reverred name of the goddess Saraswati. Translated as "autumnal", the Kashmir Shaivite tradition prominently worshipped her under that name. The Sharada Peeth, one of her sacred place, was one of the most prominent temple universities in the Indian subcontinent.

== Anemoi ==
In ancient Greek mythology Anemoi were the gods of wind, some of which were associated with seasons:

- Boreas (Septentrio in Latin) was the north wind and bringer of cold winter air
- Zephyrus or Zephyr (Favonius in Latin) was the west wind and bringer of light spring and early summer breezes
- Notus or Notos (Auster in Latin) was the south wind and bringer of the storms of late summer and autumn. Notos not only brings rain and heavy downpour, but he can also bring extremely hot air (avg. 45°C) especially in the southern parts of Greece.
- Eurus (Eurus in Latin) was the East Wind & bringer of warmth & rain
