= Avenida Carlos III =

Street in Havana

- Avenida Salvador Allende; Calzada Carlos III; Paseo Carlos III; Calle Carlos III
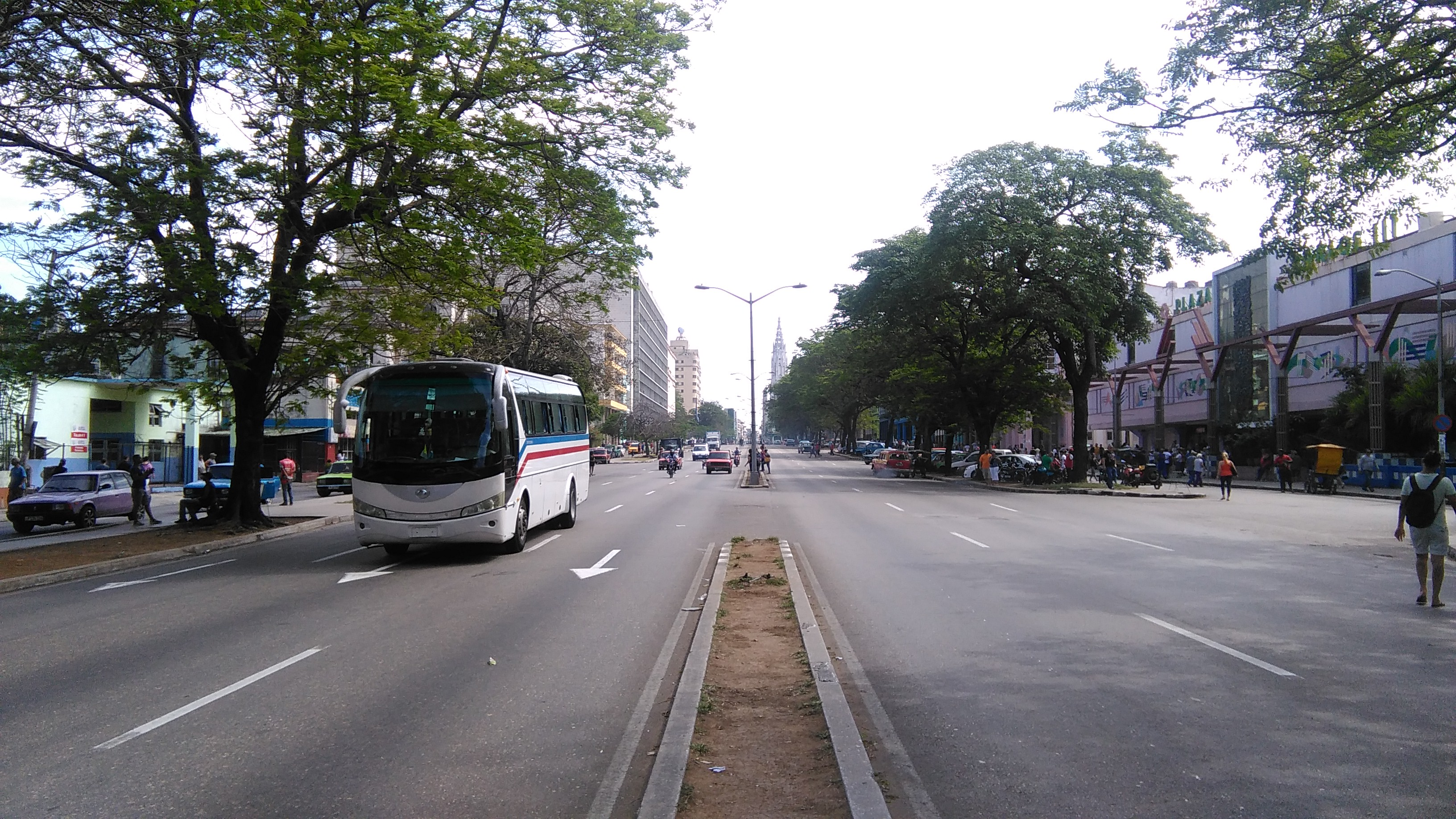
- Interactive map of Avenida Carlos III
- Former names: Paseo de Tacón (1836–1902); Alameda de Tacón (1860–1902); Paseo Militar (1836–1902); Avenida de la Independencia (1902–1936)
- Namesake: Miguel Tacón y Rosique; Charles III of Spain; Salvador Allende
- Type: Street (21st Century); Avenue (20th Century); Promenade (19th Century)
- Location: Havana; Cuba
- Quarter: Centro Habana
- Nearest transport link or station: Havana MetroBus; Havana Suburban Railway 2
- Coordinates: 23.1310°N 82.3744°W

Construction
- Construction start: 1835
- Completion: 1839–1850 (Phase 1); 1948–1955 (Phase 2)
- Inauguration: 1839

Other
- Designer: Mariano Carrillo de Albornoz

Avenida Carlos III (English: Charles III Avenue) is the most commonly used name by Habaneros for the avenue in the Centro Habana neighborhood of Havana, Cuba, officially known since 1976 as Avenida Salvador Allende (English: Salvador Allende Avenue). Initially known as Paseo de Tacón (English: Tacón Promenade), or Paseo Militar (English: Military Promenade), from 1902 to 1936, it was also known as Avenida de la Independencia (English: Independence Avenue). It was created by Captain General Miguel Tacón y Rosique who promoted the reform of the “road” that, starting from the intersection of Calle San Luis de Gonzaga (Calle Reina or Avenida Simón Bolívar) (Note: The street is eleven blocks and runs from Calle Amistad to Belascoaín. It was originally called Camino de San Luis Gonzaga; later, people called it El Mentidero, place for liars, because politicians used to give speeches here. After being renovated in 1844, the street was renamed Calle Reina in honor of Queen Isabel II. In 1918, it was renamed as Avenida Bolívar, but Habaneros keep calling it Calle Reina. There are notable colonial houses on Calle Reina. There are Art Nouveau buildings, the Cetro de Oro, the Golden Scepter, and Casa Crusellas.. At the corner with Gervasio Street is the Iglesia Sagrado Corazón de Jesús built by the Jesuits between 1914 and 1923.) and Calle Belascoáin, connected to the Castillo del Príncipe. Calle Belascoáin was the edge between the city and the countryside. Today, Avenida Carlos III is one of the busiest avenues in Havana. It is more than 50 meters in width and serves to direct traffic to and from the oldest areas of Havana. It has four lanes of traffic and is the widest historic traffic artery in the city.

== History ==
=== Planning and construction of Paseo de Tacón ===
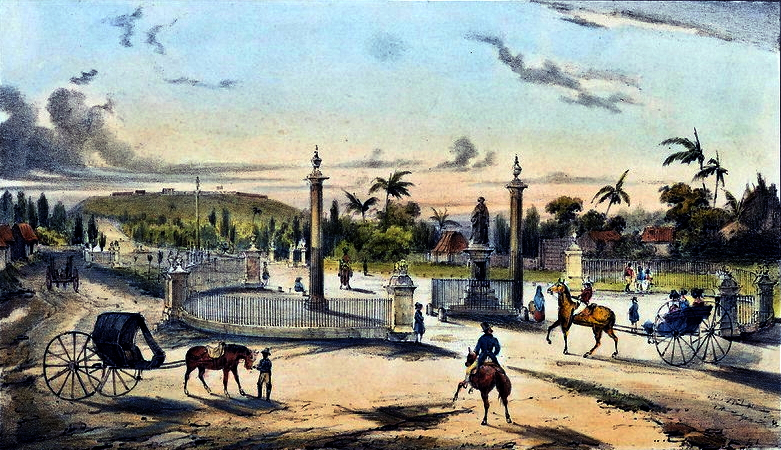
View of the entrance to the Tacón Promenade. The two doric columns seen were originally made in a set of four: two at the beginning of the promenade, and two at the end. Only two are left standing today.

Miguel Tacón y Rosique assumed command of the Captaincy General of Cuba in 1834. Within a short time, Captain General Governor Tacón established the Tacón Theatre, the Real Cárcel de La Habana, and the Plaza del Vapor – all of which he named after himself. Throughout Cuba, he constructed dozens of buildings, streets, and parks, all with his own name. In this fashion, in 1835, he directed the remodeling of an existing muddy dirt path into a promenade that connected the Castillo del Príncipe and the Quinta de los Molinos with the center of the newer districts of Havana, which he named Paseo de Tacón. Despite the Governor's desire for self-promotion, because of the presence of the Statue of Charles III placed at the eastern entrance to the promenade, most Habaneros called it Paseo Carlos III, instead of its official name. This might also have been because Tacón was considered one of the worst dictators that had ever ruled Cuba, and most Habaneros did not want to associate it with him.

Tacón said about this project:

“Havana lacked a country promenade, one where you could breathe the pure and free air, and I resolved to undertake one from Campo Peñalver to the foot of the hill where the Prince's Castle is located. This site, once marshy and prone to flooding, was the most suitable for a work of this kind in the vicinity of this city, in the part not surrounded by the sea. There was also another reason that made the work doubly useful, which was the free communication of this square with the castle, interrupted on that side during the rainy season.”

The lead engineer for the project was Mariano Carrillo de Albornoz, who before his career as a civil engineer, had been the former Capitan General of Yucatan. After receiving orders from Governor Tacón to "beautify" the city, Carrillo de Albornoz drew-up a "beautification plan," which included the new Paseo de Tacón. Carrillo de Albornoz's design anticipated a promenade that would provide a comfortable walking experience for the city's newer expanding population, who were moving outside of Old Havana, becoming, as he called them, "Extramuros," literally meaning those living beyond the original Walls of Havana (Spanish: Murallas de la Habana), which had historically protected them from foreign attacks.

The construction of the promenade required an extensive engineering project to completely elevate Calzada de San Luis Gonzaga. At that time, Calzada de San Luis Gonzaga was uneven, and riddled with potholes which damaged the wheels of carriages and carts. The problem presented to the engineers was that it could not be leveled without damaging the houses in low-lying areas. Carrillo de Albornoz realized that it was necessary to raise a central roadway 40 varas wide that could be adjoined with sidewalks on either side.

In 1838, Tacón, after having cancelled local elections and having expelled the Archbishop of Santiago, was forced to return to Spain. Paseo de Tacón was completed in 1839, during the tenure of his successor as Captain General, Joaquín Ezpeleta Enrile.

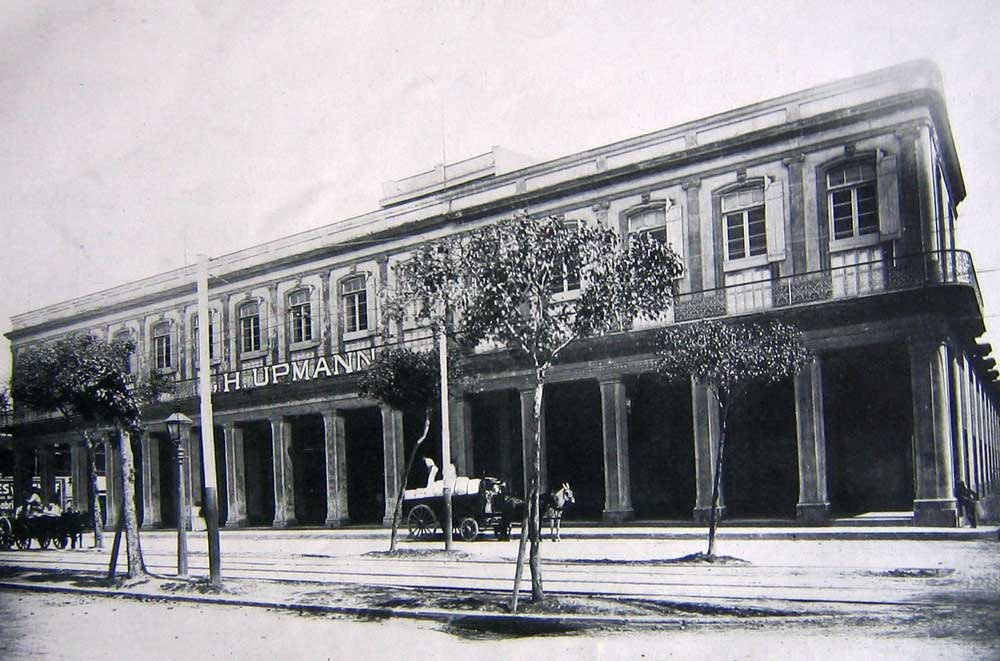
H. Upmann had a tobacco factory on Avenida Carlos III called "La Madama."

The primary function of the promenade was less about pleasure, and more utilitarian; Paseo de Tacón allowed for better communication with the colonial troops in Castillo del Príncipe, because until then it was difficult for soldiers to reach the fort, having to circumvent via the low and muddy San Lázaro Road, which became practically impassable in times of rains. The time it took to reach the city limits and the fortress was shortened significantly.

The promenade was built with two side walks for pedestrians at 60 varas wide, and a central carriageway, three times wider than the sidewalks. These were separated by four rows of New Holland pines, white poplars, and bamboo. Expansive gardens were planted alongside the promenade, with views of the harbor. In the gardens were artificial lakes and waterfalls, fountains, and winding paths.

One of the businesses on this street that was built in 1830, before the construction of the promenade, was the Garden of the Phoenix (Spanish: El Jardín El Fenix). When the promenade was completed, its street address became No. 754 Avenida Carlos III.

The Príncipe Automatic Telephone Exchange, the H. Upmann tobacco factory "La Madama," the Quinta de Toca estate, and the Freyre de Andrade Hospital were also located on Avenida Carlos III.

This was one of the first roads paved with cement in Havana.

=== After Cuban independence ===
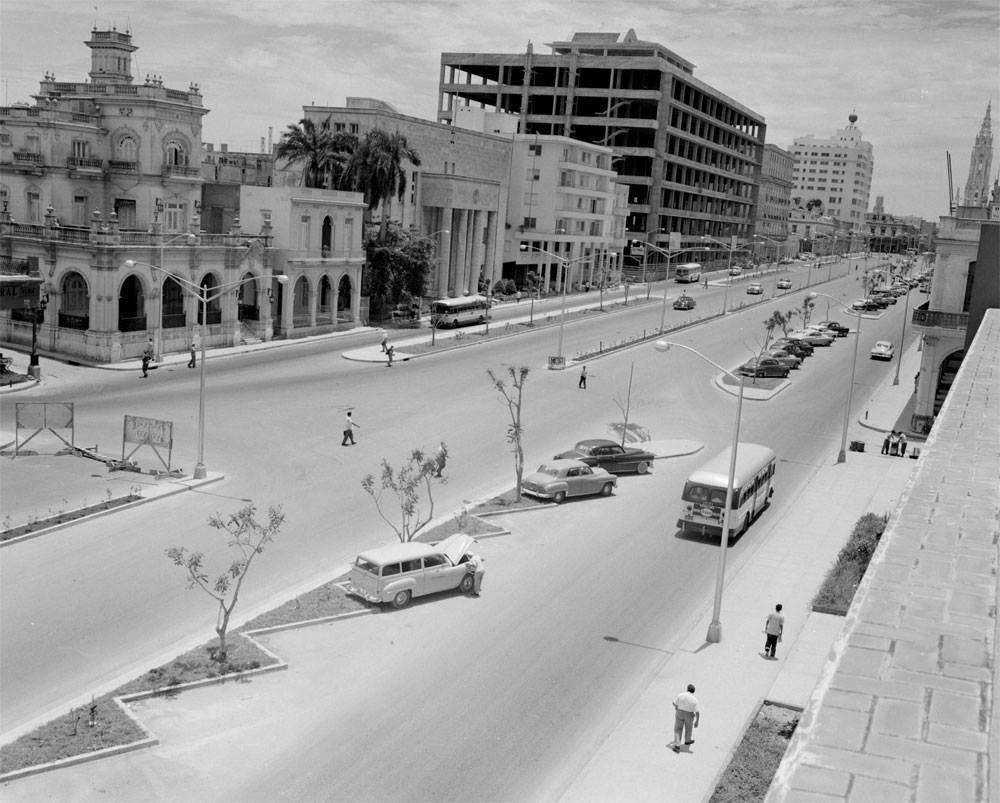
View of Carlos III sometime after 1955, when the major construction of the National Masonic Temple of Cuba had finished. Across the street from the Temple is seen Reina Church, in the far right of the frame. At the far left of the frame is the Casa de Alfredo Hornedo, the famous home of Alfredo Hornedo at the time.

In 1902, after the Republic of Cuba gained independence from the Military Government of Cuba, Havana City Council officially renamed the street Avenida de la Independencia. Despite the official name change, Habaneros continued to call it Avenida Carlos III.

Over time, as more and more cars appeared in the city, the "beautiful" aesthetics of Avenida Carlos III were converted into a standard modern street for vehicles. Several statues were relocated elsewhere, the water basins of the fountains were removed and converted into simple standing statues, and much of the ornamentation wasted away from natural degradation.

In 1936, the City Historian of Havana, Emilio Roig de Leuchsenring, convinced the municipal government to officially restore its name to Avenida Carlos III, the name that most Cubans already called it.

In 1946, the Cuban branch of the Sociedad Económica de los Amigos del País was built by Evelio Govantes y Félix Cabarrocas. It contained a nine-floor library with over 30,000 books and other written works.

Carlos III became the headquarters of the Popular Socialist Party, the Cuban Electric Company (now called the Cuban Ministry of Energy and Mines). The Cuban branch of the Pepsi-Cola Company, and the newspaper Alerta were also found here.

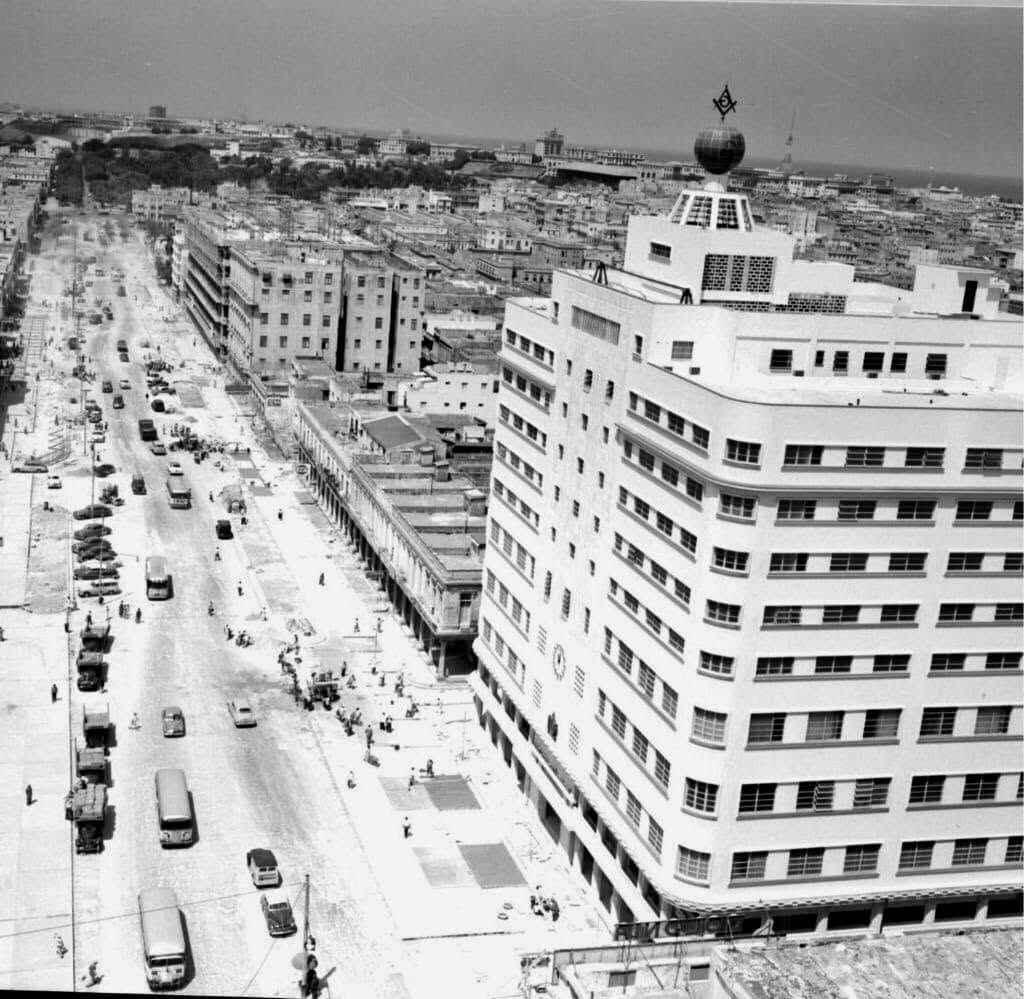
A view of Avenida Carlos III looking towards the west. The National Masonic Temple of Cuba stands prominently on the right side of the frame.

In 1955, urban planners from the Cuban Ministry of Public Works (MOP) (Spanish: Ministerio de Obras Públicas) sought a modernization program for the street, to modify it so that traffic could link directly to the city center from the Boyeros Expressway. They removed most of the older trees along the road, pulled what remained of the original fountains, and two of the doric columns. The tramway tracks were dug-up and replaced by dedicated transit lanes.

The National Masonic Temple of Cuba was completed in 1955 and opened to the public during the Third Inter-American Conference on Symbolic Freemasonry.

Also in 1955, the Mercado de Carlos III was constructed.

In 1957, Avenida Carlos III was widened again from Avenida Infanta to the foot of the hill at the Prince's Castle.

In 1976, the street was officially named Avenida Salvador Allende, in honor of the former Chilean President Salvador Allende. In repetition of the pattern, the name that the government wanted people to use never really stuck. While this name did appear on all government maps of the city, Habaneros never called it that, and now most maps of the city show both names alongside one-another. The statue of Salvador Allende that was originally intended for this street never appeared here, and was instead erected on the Avenida de los Presidentes.

== Public transportation ==
=== Rail ===
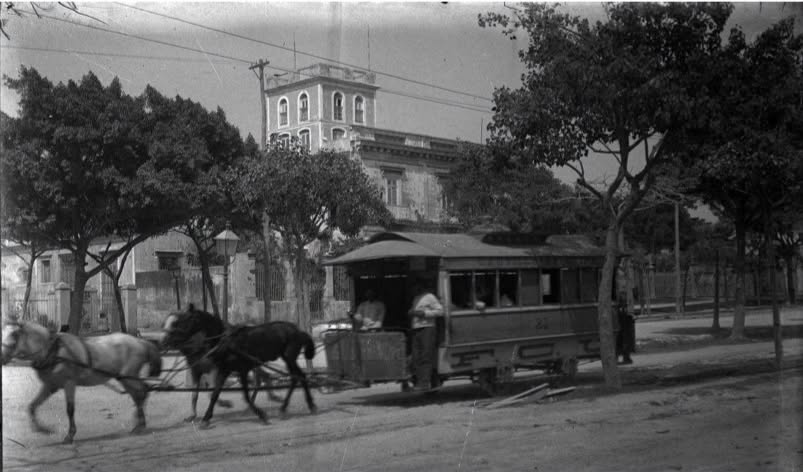
Tram 21 was a horse-drawn urban railway. Its primary station was the Príncipe terminus, located on Avenida Carlos III.

In 1832, Claudio Martínez de Pinillos, Count of Villanueva, was elected as the President of the Junta de Fomento (English: Cuban Development Board). When he got into office, he began making plans to build a railroad line of Ferrocarriles de Cuba from Havana to Güines to benefit Havana's Sacarocracia (English: Sugar aristocracy) and increase the efficiency of the country's minimum sugar output per annum. Alfred Cruger, a citizen from the United States (formerly of the USACE), was hired as the railroad's first lead construction engineer. To overcome the railroad's financial problems, the Cuban Development Board signed a loan contract with an English banker named Alexander Robertson.

Alfred Cruger tendered his resignation with the Chesapeake and Ohio Canal in 1834, and arrived in Havana with a handpicked team soon after. The team suggested several possible paths that the new railroad might take, and the Development Board decided that it preferred an option which would travel along Paseo Carlos III and pass to the south near Castillo del Príncipe.

Miguel de Tacón objected to the plan, and the Spanish Crown interceded on his behalf. They issued a Royal Order which created an Extraordinary Commission to draft a plan for the railroad. Tacón, the leader of the commission, suggested that Garcini's Fields should act as the departure terminus. Martínez de Pinillos and Tacón fought each other politically over this. While Garcini's Fields was chosen as the terminus, Tacón was ultimately forced to tender his resignation in 1839.

==== Marianao Railway and Concha Station ====
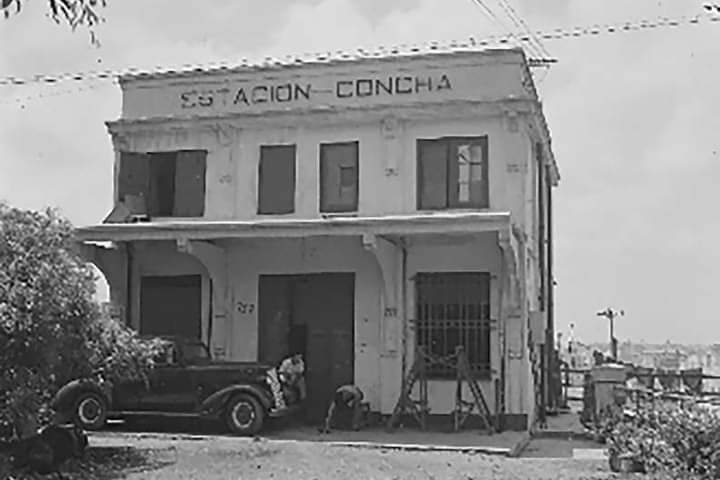
Concha Station, at No. 337 Avenida Carlos III, served as a train station since 1863.

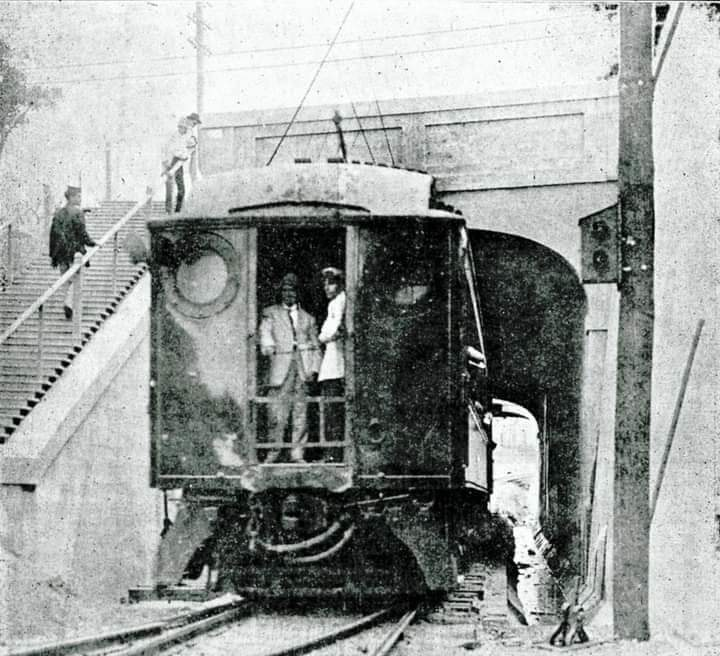
The tunnel under Concha Station was built in 1914 to service the Marianao Railway, which crossed underneath the Havana Electric Railway.

In 1858, Governor José Gutiérrez de la Concha, Marquis of Havana, granted permission for the construction of the Marianao Railway, a streetcar line from Havana to Marianao. The railway was initially owned by the company Porto y Cabello and its namesakes Joaquín de Porto and Félix Cabello, but they then ceded their interests to a company created by the General Society of Real Estate Credit. In 1862, after financial difficulties, they acquired a loan from W. Gibson & Company to finish laying the 20 kilometers of track. The tracks were completed in 1863.

In 1863, Marianao Railway constructed Concha Station at No. 337 Avenida Carlos III, between Árbol Seco and Retiro. At 7am on June 19, 1863, the first streetcar departed Concha Station on its inaugural journey to the Samá Station, located on Avenida 43 in Marianao.

The first steam locomotive on the Marianao Railway traveled in 1865.

In 1871, Marianao Railway became Marianao & Havana Railroad Company, but this company shut down in 1876 and its debts were auctioned off. In 1879, the Marianao & Havana Railway Company was established in London, which in 1884 extended the line by 6 kilometers towards the beach.

In 1905, the railway was acquired by an English company called United Railways of the Havana and Regla Warehouse Limited, who extended the line another 10 kilometers to Hoyo Colorado.

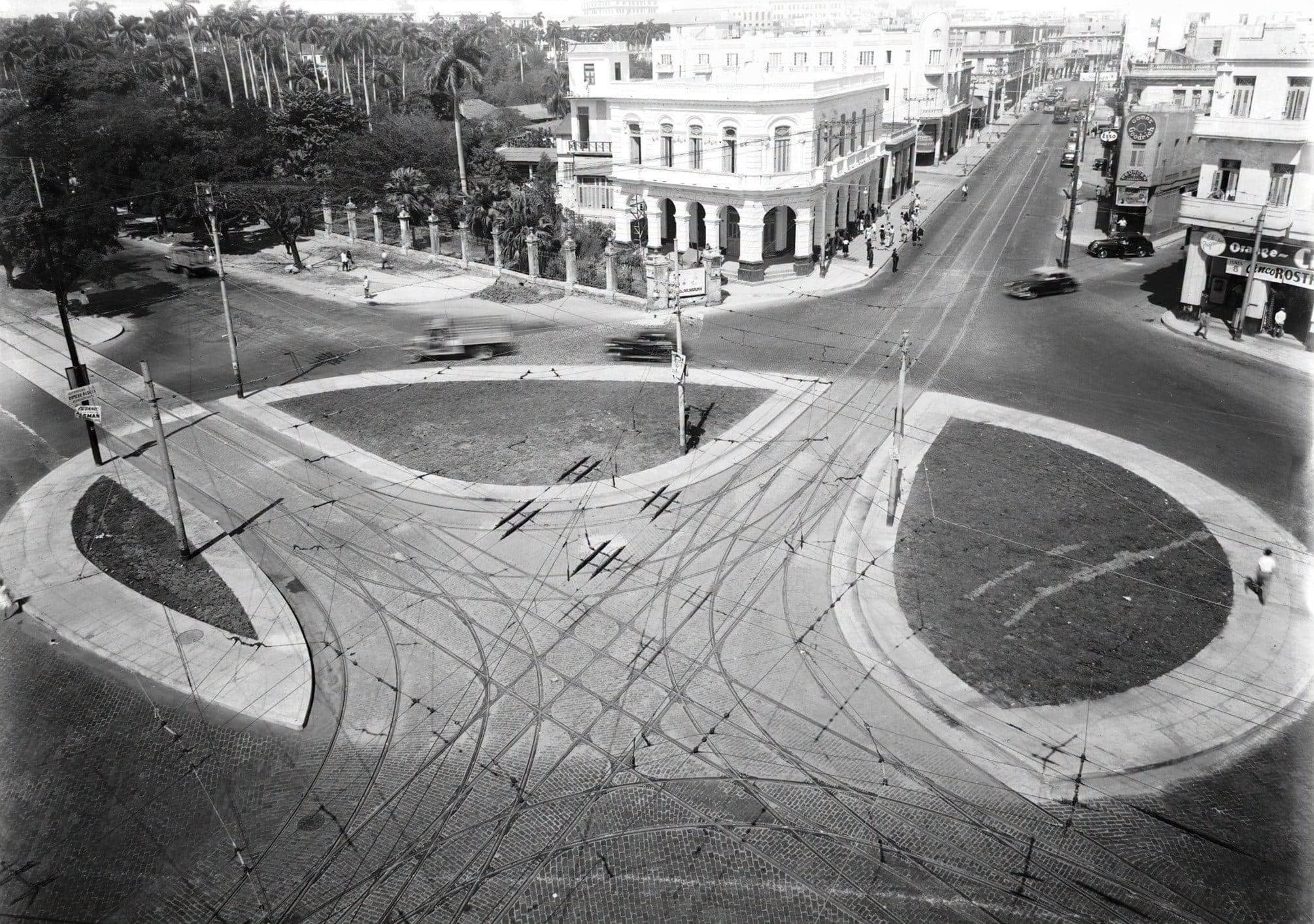
As seen in this photograph of the intersection of Avenida Infanta and Avenida Carlos III, streetcars and trams were highly integrated into this street.

On May 29, 1911, Havana City Council granted permission to United Railways to build a tunnel that crossed underneath Avenida Carlos III. This tunnel linked together the Marianao Railway lines with the United Railways lines, from Zanja Street, to extend to Galiano. The tunnel was completed in 1914. To provide electric power to the railway, an electric power plant was built next to Concha Station.

In the 1940s, United Railways operated a special commuter train specifically for their own employees. Each morning, they loaded at Concha Station and travelled to their shops in Ciénaga de Zapata. Every night, they would bring the employees back.

Concha Station was demolished around the year 1955 to make way for the Mercado de Carlos III, which needed its footprint. Both of the access points have been preserved, and the tunnel still exists. Today, the former Concha Station is part of the Vivarta Theatre Studio.

=== Streetcars and trams ===
Avenida Carlos III was a major line for the network of Streetcars of Havana.

On April 29, 1952, the #388 Streetcar of Havana Electric Railway route P-2 departed Quinta de los Molinos for the last time. This was the last streetcar journey ever made in the history of Havana.

For some time, line 2 of the Havana Suburban Railway serviced a stop near Avenida Carlos III, and plans were in place for a long time to place a station of Metro Havana here.

== The five roundabouts ==
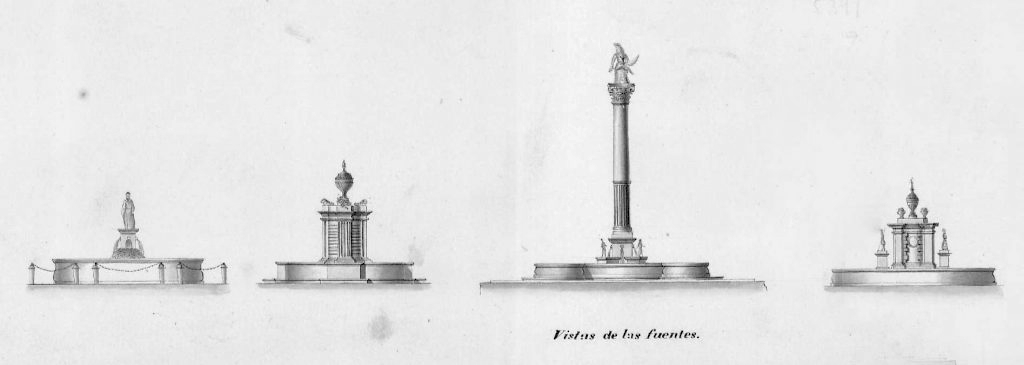
Aside from the Statue of Charles III, there were four fountains installed along the promenade.

Between 1835 and 1839, five roundabouts were constructed in the meridian along the carriage way, each with either a statue or a fountain of a figure important to the image and history of Havana. These were each placed at intersections with other streets.

=== Statue of Charles III ===
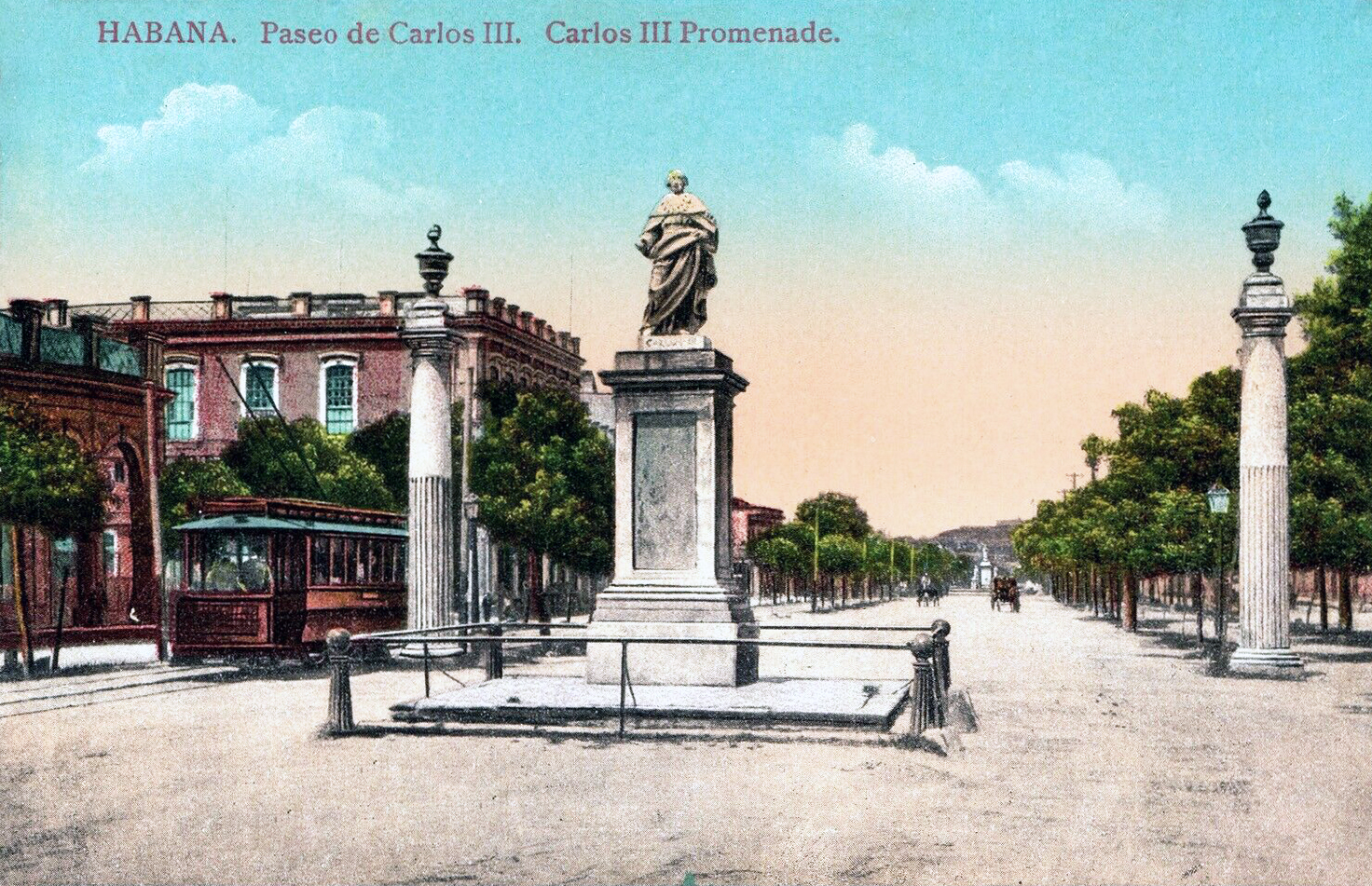
The Statue of Charles III, carved by Cosme Velázquez, was placed at the first roundabout in the same year that construction of the promenade began.

At the eastern entrance to the promenade, next to its intersection with Calle Belascoáin and Calle Reina, de Albornoz erected a famous marble statue of the former King of Spain, Charles III (Spanish: Carlos III). This statue was originally erected on Paseo de Isabel II at the Fuente de la India on November 4, 1803 (the King's birthday), but it was moved to Paseo de Tacón in late 1835. The Statue of Carlos III was sculpted in 1799, the work of the famous Spanish sculptor Cosme Velázquez, originally from Logroño, who had studied his craft at the Fine Arts School of Cádiz. The Statue of Charles III depicts the king standing on foot, wearing a royal mantle and holding a sceptre. The pedestal it rested on was 3.5 varas tall, crested with bronze bas-reliefs and an inscription dedicated to the monarch.

In the central space just next to the Statue of Charles III, stood two smaller pillars topped with marble stone lions. Underneath the lions, marble plaques were placed with two different inscriptions. On the right pillar, were the words: "This work was begun by His Excellency Don Miguel Tacon in the year 1835 and continued until 1838, when he left his command." On the left pillar were the words: "Completed by his successor, His Excellency Don Joaquin de Ezpeleta in 1839."

Two fluted doric columns stood on either side of the road with simple capitals and stone containers; described in various documents as either ciborium, vases, or urns. These doric columns acted as a symbolic gateway to the promenade. They were both 13 varas tall from the ground to the bottom of the urns.

While the street's official name remained Paseo de Tacón, because the statue was placed at the entrance to the promenade from the city, Habaneros immediately used is as a navigational landmark. For a short while, it was informally known as "the street with the statue of Charles III," but quickly became simplified as Charles III Promenade, Charles III Street, and Charles III Avenue. For over a century, even though the street officially had other names, Habaneros always called it Charles III. Paseo Carlos III was named by locals after the statue that was in the street, not the king that the statue depicted.

The two doric columns originally on the side of the central roadway are the only ornamentals from the original promenade that remain standing where they were first erected. Today the famous Statue of Charles III is located in Plaza de Armas.

=== Fountain of Ceres ===
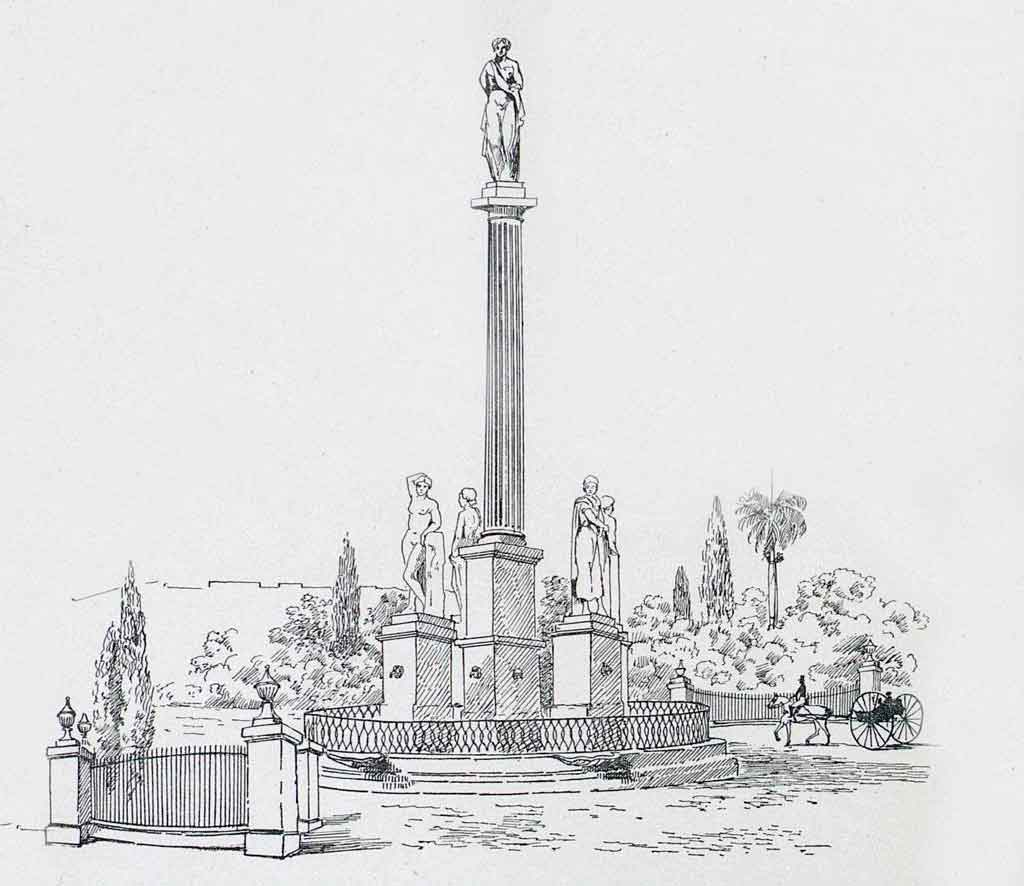
At the Fountain of Ceres, the goddess Ceres originally stood on the top of a long column, surrounded by four smaller sculptures.

The second roundabout was at the intersection of Calle Oquendo and Calle Soledad, 200 varas (167 meters) away from the Statue of Charles III. Here stood the Fuente de Ceres (English: Fountain of Ceres). Originally, the statue of the goddess Ceres stood on a high fluted column, 23 varas (19 meters) high, lending this fountain the informal name Fuente de la Columna (English: Fountain of the Column).

In a mocking intonation, Habaneros would often refer to the statue of Ceres at the top of the column as the Estatua de Isabel II (English: Statue of Isabella II), in reference to Isabella II. In Roman mythology, Ceres was the goddess of agriculture and fertility, and in 1847, Isabella II was embroiled in a love affair that made news headlines around the world. The name confused foreigners who visited Havana, who sometimes wrote accounts of the "Statue of Isabella II on Charles III Avenue," in their correspondences and diaries. This confusion was layered by the fact that there was also a legitimate Statue of Isabella II in Parque Central, which was at that time known as Parque Isabel II.

Standing on the outside of the Fountain of Ceres were four nine-foot equidistant pedestals. On top of these were marble statues of the Four Seasons, allegorical gods attributed to each of the seasons. At the top of these four pedestals were high-relief lion mouths acting as water spouts, shooting water into the 1 meter deep water basin of the fountain.

The long column was removed during a renovation of the street, and the statue of Ceres was installed on the smaller rectangular pedestal that had originally served as the base of that column. The water basin of the fountain was removed, leaving only the Statue of Ceres behind. By 1910, Ceres had lost her arms. In 1940, the statue was then placed on the sidewalk to allow for a more constant flow of traffic because it was causing accidents. Some time in the 1950's, the head of the statue disappeared. Around 1955, the Statue of Ceres was moved to the sidewalk in front of the former home of Ensign Francisco del Pico on Calle Amargura, where it remains today as a headless, armless statue on a pedestal.

The Four Seasons were eventually moved to the courtyard of the Convento de Santa Clara de Asis.

=== Fountain of the Villagers ===
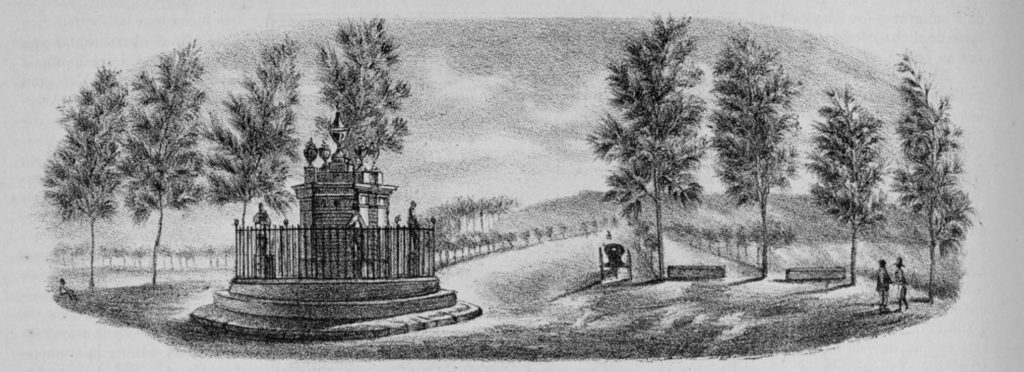
The Fountain of the Villagers seen at the third roundabout.

The third roundabout was 522 varas beyond from the Fountain of Ceres, at the intersection of Calzada de la Infanta María Luisa Fernanda, also known as Avenida Infanta, and featured the Fuente de los Aldeanos (English: Fountain of the Villagers), which was constructed in 1837. Due to the four pilasters that surrounded the central pedestal which held cups of fruit, Habaneros also called this fountain by the name of Fuente de las Frutas (English: Fountain of the Fruits).

Like the other fountains, this fountain had four high-relief lion heads that acted as water spouts into a basin. At the exterior of this arrangement were allegorical figures representing Strength, Beauty, Poetry, and Love. These figures were originally carved out of plaster, but were replaced by marble figures later on.

=== Fountain of the Satyrs ===
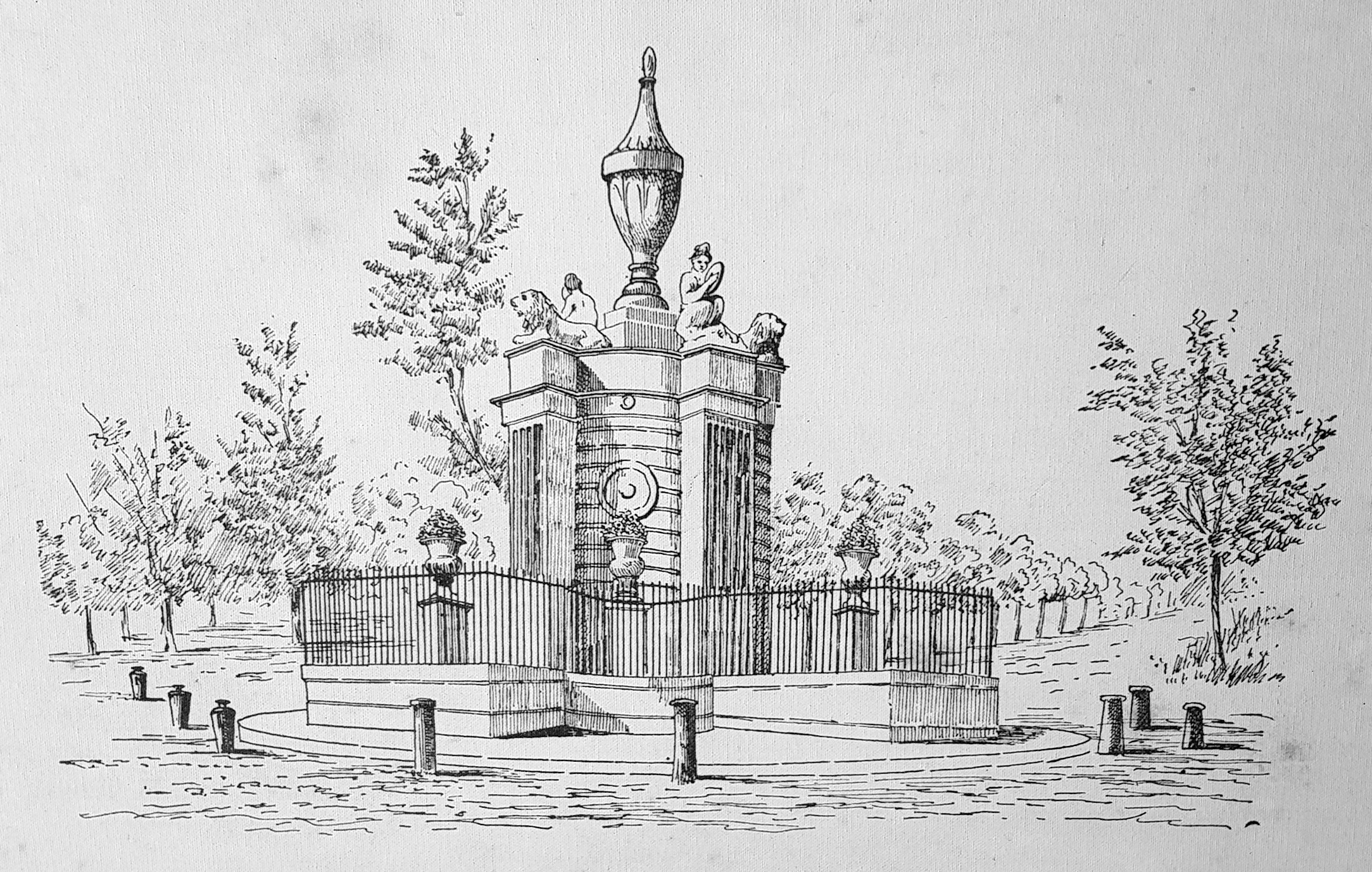
The Fountain of the Satyrs originally appeared with a ciborium or urn at its center.

At the fourth roundabout in 1836, directly in front of the gate of the Quinta de los Molinos, was constructed the Fuente de los Sátiros (English: Fountain of the Satyrs). One central pedestal featured a tall stone ciborium or urn. Directly attached to the central pedestal were four pilasters; two were topped with reclining stone lions, and the other two were topped with marble Satyrs. This arrangement resembled a Greek temple without rustication. The Satyrs faced to the east and west, and the lions faced to the north and south.

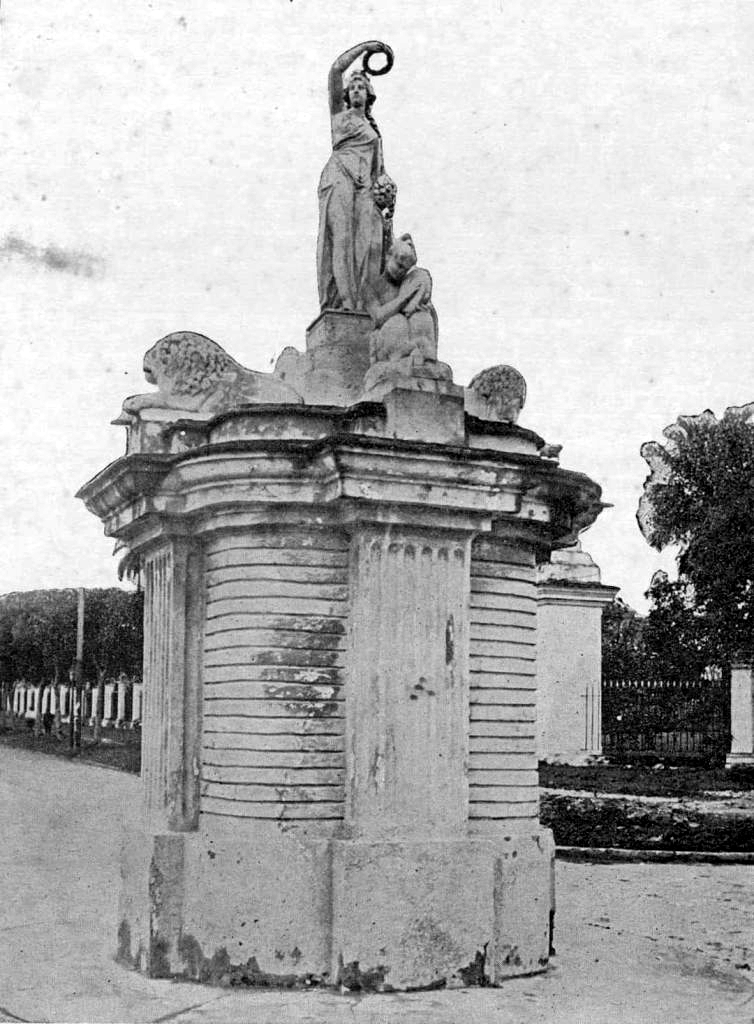
Sometime before 1914, the central urn was replaced with a statue of Pomona, and the water basin was removed.

On the exterior of the arrangement, next to the central pillar, were placed four Etruscan vases on equidistant pedestals, where flowering plants were always kept in bloom by the city's gardeners. Because of these constantly-blooming flowers, Habaneros also called this fountain the Fuente de las Flores (English: Fountain of the Flowers).

The basin of the fountain was fed by eight water spouts.

Sometime before 1914, the central urn was replaced with a cast iron statue of the goddess Pomona.

At some point, the stone urn and the two stone lions were moved to the intersection of 5th Avenue and 42nd Street in Playa, where they remain today. The Satyrs are located at the former home of Ensign Francisco del Pico on Calle Amargura.

=== Fountain of Aesculapius ===
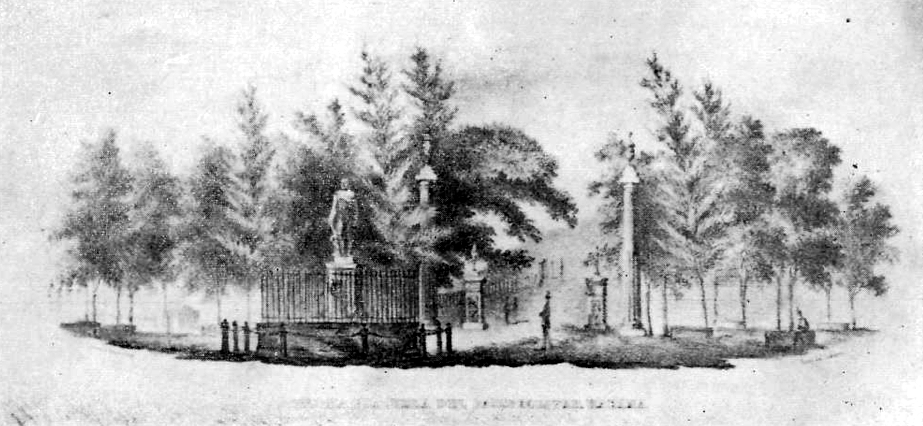
The "Aesculapius" fountain, as portrayed in the book Picturesque Walk through the Island of Cuba.

At the western exit of the promenade, where it turned into the Zapata Causeway and the Prince's Castle, the fifth roundabout was constructed in 1836 with the Fuente de Esculapio (English: Fountain of Aesculapius). The figure of Asclepius, the Greek God of medicine, stood atop a square pedestal in the center of an octagonal basin. This basin featured four spouts, one on each side of the pedestal. This fountain was made of cruder marble than the other statues along the promenade.

The Fountain of Aesculapius at that time also served as the final landmark on the only road that existed at the time to Colon Cemetery. The famous Cuban poet and lawyer, Dr. José Antonio González Lanuza, noted the irony in the fact that the Greek god of medicine was the last thing you saw before going to the cemetery in a humorous poem.

Two more doric columns stood on either side of the road next to the Fountain of Aesculapius, identical to those at the eastern entrance, acting as another symbolic gateway. These columns disappeared and no historian has been able to trace their current whereabouts.

Around the year 1844, Calle Reina underwent a "beautification" project of its own.

== See also ==
- Campo de Marte, Havana
- Quinta de los molinos
- Plaza del Vapor, Havana
- Palacio de Aldama
- Barrio de San Lázaro, Havana
