= Pat Ka Chiong =

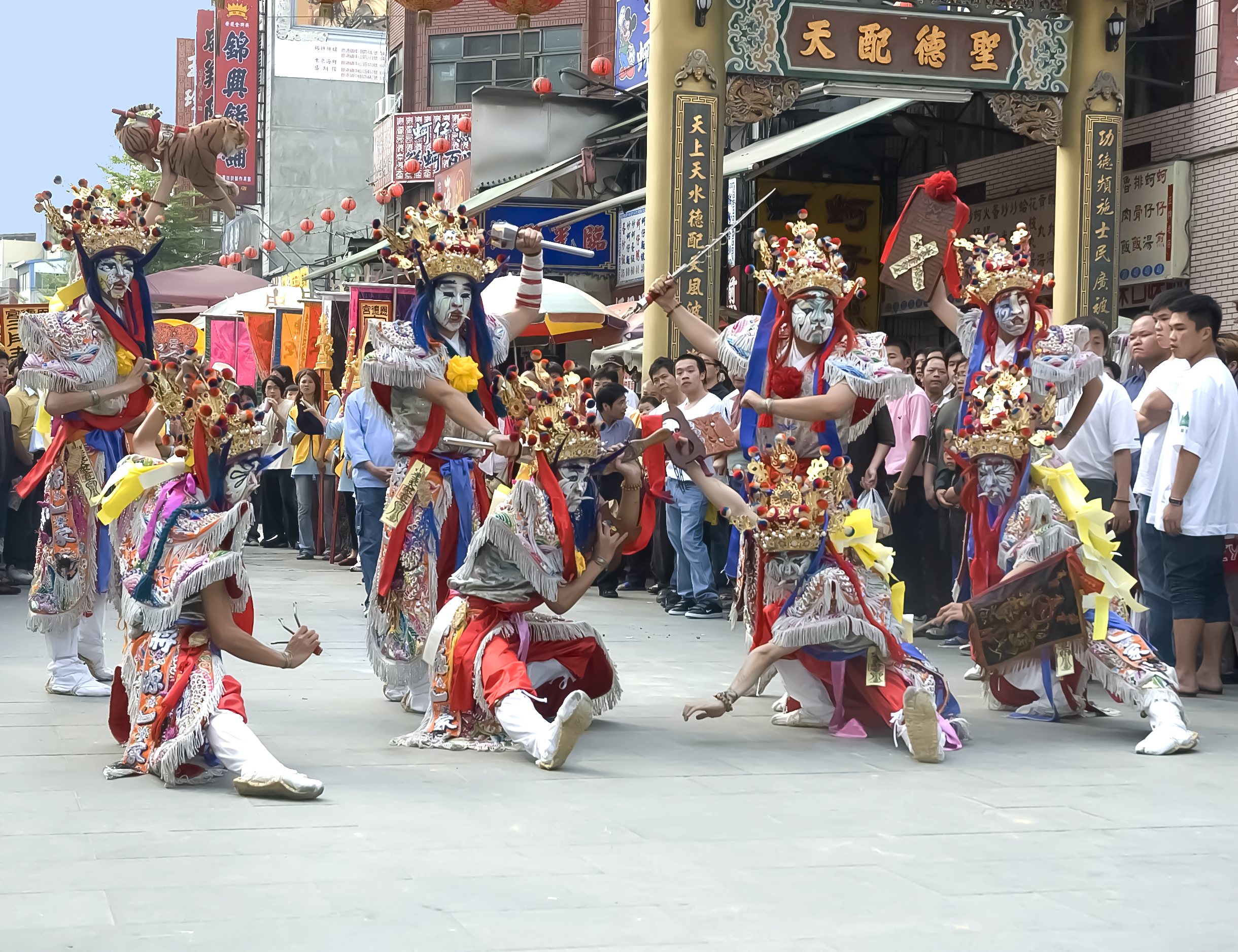
Pat Ka Chiong at a religious event

Pat Ka Chiong (Chinese: 八家將; Pe̍h-ōe-jī: Pat-ka-chiòng) originated from the Southern Han folk beliefs and myths, and usually generally refers to eight members of the godly realm. The general understanding of the origin of Pat Ka Chiong is that it is derived from the existence of eight generals who performed exorcism of evil spirits for the Wufu Emperor (五福大帝). These eight generals became revered as the gods of the underworld, and are represented as the bodyguards or attendants for the temples of the nether Gods such as the Dongyue Emperor (東獄大帝), Yama (King of Hell, 閻羅王) and City Gods (城隍). Gradually Pat Ka Chiong evolved to appear also as bodyguards to Ong Yah (Royal Lord, 王爺) and Matsu (媽祖), and at many other temples. Later on, believers at those temples dressed up as Pat Ka Chiong in order to defend the Gods. These actions evolved into Taiwanese folk activities, which are part of the Bu-tin (Military Array, 武陣) in Tin-thau (Taiwanese troupes, 陣頭). Pat Ka Chiong is responsible for the capture of ghosts and evil spirits, bringing safety and good luck, and providing protection. They contain a strong religious nature, and Tin-thau (Taiwanese troupes, 陣頭) often seem as mysterious, threatening and serious. Some Pat Ka Chiong members have relations with Taiwanese gangsters.

== Name ==
Pat Ka Chiong is one of the general troupes in Taiwan. The general groups are originated from Shih Jia Jiang (什家將) in Tainan Bai Long An (Tainan White Dragon Temple, 臺南白龍庵), and after spreading to Chiayi Ci Ji Temple (嘉義慈濟宮), the number of Gods in the array becomes four main generals and four Season Gods, that is eight members in total. Therefore, it is called Pat Ka Chiong (The Eight Generals). According to different heritages around different actual situations, the number of Gods can be four, six, eight, ten, twelve or thirteen. The reasons these general groups are named either Shih Jia Jiang or Pat Ka Chiong are due to their heritages. However, nowadays the general media and the public sector call all the general troupes "Pat Ka Chiong".

== Compositions and responsibilities ==
The number of Gods in Pat Ka Chiong or Sip Ka Chiong is not fixed. The more complete group is with a number of thirteen Gods, and it is also the common type of Pat Ka Chiong in Taiwan's temples. Its members include: Shih Yi (什役), Wen Chai (Civil Official, 文差), Wu Chai (Military Official, 武差), Gan Ye (甘爺), Liu Ye (柳爺), Xie Ye (謝爺), Fan Ye (范爺), the Great Spring God (春大神), the Great Summer God (夏大神), the Great Autumn God (秋大神), the Great Winter God (冬大神), Wen Pan Guan (Civil Judger, 文判官) and Wu Pan Guan (Military Judger, 武判官). Their identities and Responsibilities are as follows:

Shih Yi (什役), Wen Chai (Civil Official, 文差) and Wu Chai (Military Official, 武差)

- Shih Yi (什役): Also known as Xing Ju Ye (God of torture instruments, 刑具爺). He carries instruments on his shoulders, and stands in the front of the group to check the path and lead the troupe to worship and salute. He is responsible to avoid evils and make sure the troupe and worship groups are walking towards the temple on a safe track. Shih Yi is the director of the troupe. He knocks the instrument against each other to create sounds while walking with special rhythms and patterns of footsteps. This role is usually held by a senior member of Pat Ka Chiong.
- Wen Chai (Civil Official, 文差) and Wu Chai (Military Official, 武差): They are responsible to pass on Gods' orders. Wen Chai is responsible for receiving orders, and Wu Chai is responsible for passing orders. Wen Chai is also called General Chen (陳將軍) or Chen God (陳大神), and Wu Chai is also called General Liu (劉將軍) or Liu God (劉大神). These two roles are usually played by children or younger members. However, Pat Ka Chiong in Chiayi focuses more on the actions of Wen Chai and Wu Chai. Thus, these two roles are often played by main performers in Chiayi.

The Front Four Members

- Gan Ye (甘爺): Named Pen-Fei Gan (甘鵬飛), also known as the General Gan (甘將軍), Gan God (甘大神) and Day Tour God (日遊神). He is responsible for the execution of sentences.
- Liu Ye (柳爺): Named Yu Liu (柳鈺), also known as General Liu (柳將軍), Liu God (柳大神) and Night Tour God (夜遊神). He is responsible for the execution of sentences with Gan Ye. Both Gan Ye and Liu Ye are arranged at the first row of the group, so they are also called "Group Leader (班頭)" and "Front Row (頭排)". As they are responsible for execution of sentences, they are also known as "Supporters of Penalties (撐刑)". They take turns to supervise the good and bad behaviors of people during day and night time. They are often enshrined in the Dongyue Temple (東嶽廟), Cheng Huang Temple (City Gods Temple, 城隍廟) and some other temples.
- Xie Ye (謝爺): Named Bi-An Xie (謝必安), also known as General Xie (謝將軍), Da Ye (First Lord, 大爺), Qi Ye (Seventh Lord, 七爺), Gao Ye (Tall Lord, 高爺) and Zhuo Ye (Catching Lord, 捉爺). He is responsible for catching ghosts and evils.
- Fan Ye (范爺): Wu-Jiu Fan (范無救), also known as the General Fan (范將軍), Er Ye (Second Lord, 二爺), Ba Ye (Eighth Lord, 八爺), Ai Ye (Short Lord, 矮爺) and Na Ye (Arresting Lord, 拿爺). He is responsible for catching ghosts and evils.

The Back Four Members

- The Great Spring God (春大神): Wears blue gown with painted dragon face (also known as lotus pattern). He is responsible for the section of waking up criminals in the interrogation of captured ghosts.
- The Great Summer God (夏大神): Wears red gown with painted turtle face (also known as plum blossom pattern). He is responsible for the section of burning criminals in the interrogation of captured ghosts.
- The Great Autumn God (秋大神): Wears black gown with painted bird face (also known as bamboo pattern). He is responsible for the section of beating criminals in the interrogation of captured ghosts.
- The Great Winter God (冬大神): Wears blue gown with painted tiger face (also known as chrysanthemum pattern). He is responsible for the section of threatening criminals in the interrogation of captured ghosts.

These four Gods are called The Four Seasons Gods (四季神) and The Four Seasons Emperor (四季帝君). Their identities or surnames and stories have different versions such as General "Ang (洪), Lau (劉), Pheng (鵬), Kim (金)", General "Ang (洪), Tso (曹), Pang (馮), Kim (金)", General "Ho (何), Tio (張), Chhi (徐), Tso (曹)", "Png (方), Yeoh (楊), Ho (何), Sng (孫)" God, "Ho (何), Yeoh (楊), Png (方), Sng (孫)" God and many more.

Bûn-phòaⁿ-koaⁿ (Civil Judger, 文判官) and Bú-phòaⁿ-koaⁿ (Military Judger, 武判官)

- Bûn-phòaⁿ-koaⁿ (Civil Judger, 文判官): He is in charge of the book of "life and death" (生死簿) and responsible for investigating the world of goods and evils, in order to determine the length of each person's life.
- Bú-phòaⁿ-koaⁿ (Military Judger, 武判官): He is responsible for escorting ghosts.

Bûn-phòaⁿ-koaⁿ and Bú-phòaⁿ-koaⁿ are the highest Gods in the medium position of the group. Some troupes do not have these two roles in their troupes.

== See also ==
- 8+9
