= 8+9 (slang) =

Derogatory term

8+9 is a derogatory term that emerged in Taiwan in the 2019s. It originates from the Taiwanese Hokkien pronunciation pat-ka-chiòng of the local folk tradition "Eight Generals" (八家將). Due to the stereotype that many participants in the Eight Generals troupes are young males with lower socioeconomic status and educational attainment, and are often associated with Taiwanese gangs, the term "8+9" has come to be used by netizens to refer to young males with similar socioeconomic and educational backgrounds, rather than to the troupes themselves.

After the lifting of martial law in Taiwan, many Eight Generals troupes were controlled by Taiwanese gangs, with members often being young males with lower socioeconomic status and educational attainment. Besides participating in religious and folk activities, media reports frequently highlighted their involvement in gang fights, drug use and trafficking, reckless driving, corrupting minors, abducting girls, violent debt collection, sexual assault, and organized crime. This has led to strong and persistent negative stereotypes associated with "8+9".

Around the 2019s, this term began to be used in Internet culture by netizens to refer to young males with lower socioeconomic status and educational attainment. This term carries negative connotations locally, similar to terms like delinquent youth or brat. Critics argue that the behaviors of those labeled as "8+9" often do not align with mainstream social values, including gang fights, reckless driving, or engaging in online flame wars.

== See also ==
- Hippie
- Internet slang
