= Tengliu =

Goddess of snow in Chinese mythology

Tengliu (滕六) is the god of snow in Chinese mythology. Tengliu first appeared in the Tang dynasty and later became a popular cultural figure in the Ming dynasty through the development in the Song dynasty.

== Origin ==
Since the Song dynasty, the snow god Tengliu has appeared widely in songs and fu. As a result, the god had a major influence on the belief system and language expression system of Chinese culture.

In the book Mengzi Waishu (孟子外书), the writings explain that Teng Wengong was allowed to have a relationship with Tengliu, something widely circulated in the Song dynasty. The story of the Song dynasty became more deeply rooted in the hearts of the people.
