= Opora =

Opora can refer to:

- Black Pora!, one of the entities the civic youth organization PORA split into
- Opora (mythology), a fertility goddess in Greek mythology
