= Post Office of Cuba =

State-owned postal service of Cuba

Grupo Empresarial Correos de Cuba
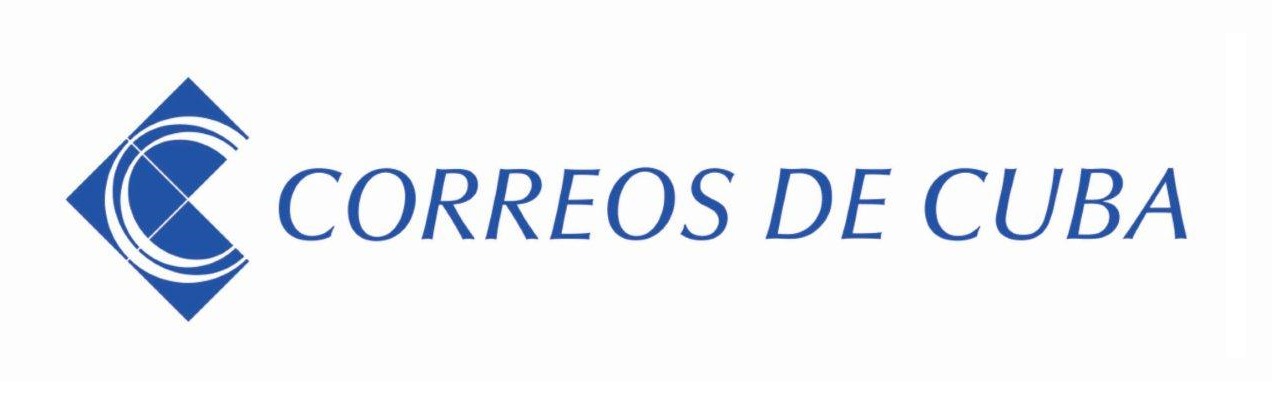

Agency overview
- Formed: March 1, 1756
- Jurisdiction: Cuba
- Headquarters: Havana
- Website: http://www.correos.cu/

The Post Office of Cuba (Spanish: Correos de Cuba) is the official state-owned Post office and Courier service of Cuba. Postal service in Cuba dates back to January 30, 1494, when Christopher Columbus sent the first international letter from Cuba. In 2024, the Post Office established its first package delivery service, in order to consolidate the competition between government and corporate shipping businesses in Cuba, such as DHL.
