= Military Lodge =

Type of Masonic Lodge

A Military Lodge is any functional operative or symbolic Masonic lodge which is established within a country's military and composed entirely of actively serving military members at any rank. Military Lodges were especially responsible for the initial spread of Freemasonry throughout the British Empire, being established by each of the Grand Lodges of England, Scotland, and Ireland during their territorial expansion. The Spanish Empire and French Empires also possessed Military Lodges, despite the various Vatican and Royal laws banning the practice of Freemasonry in those countries. Naval Lodges are those Military Lodges established specifically from within a country's navy, such as the Caribbean Naval Lodge, which is the Naval Lodge at Guantanamo Bay Naval Base.
