= Santa María–Calatrava Treaty =

1836 peace treaty between Mexico and Spain

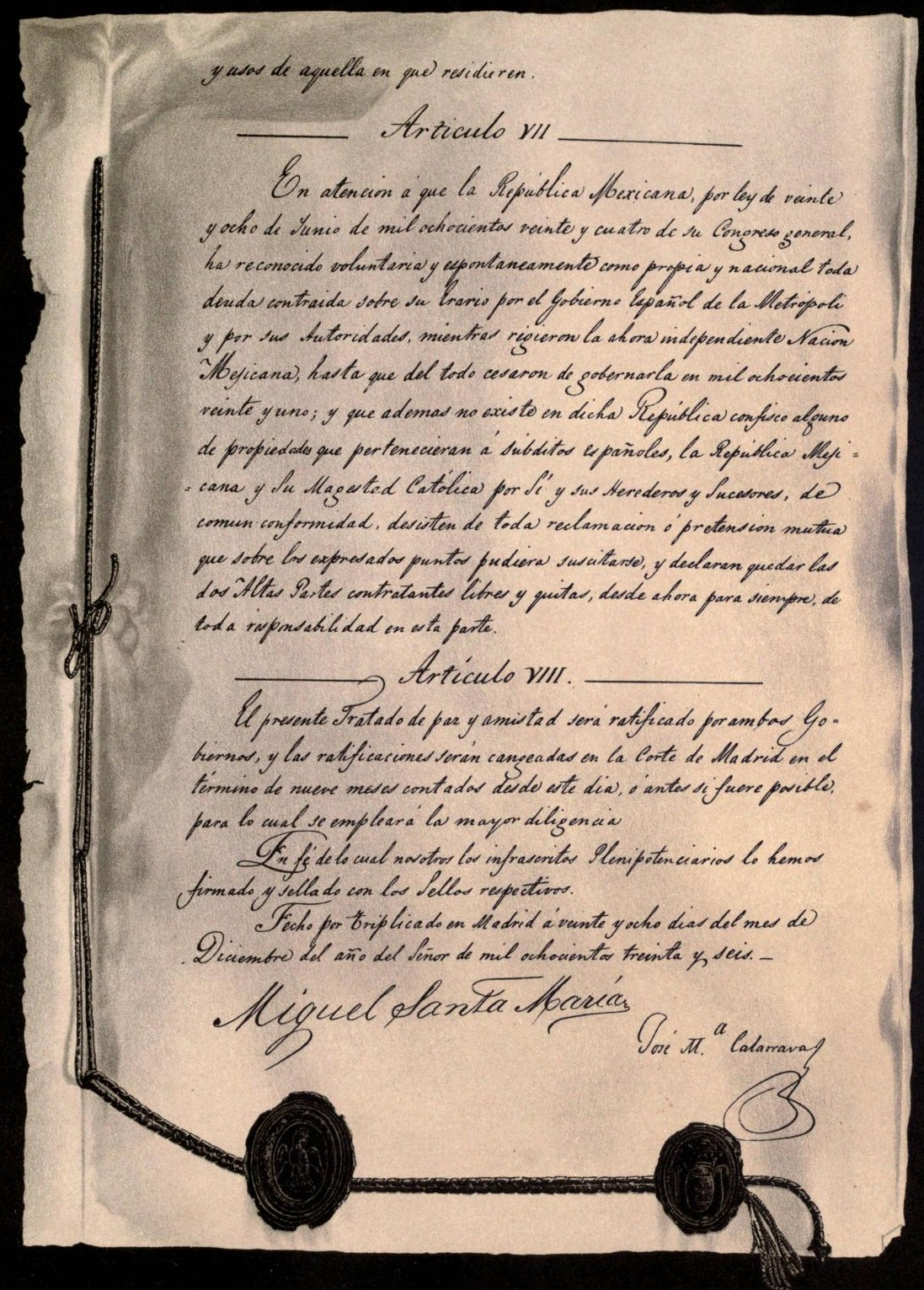
Facsimile of the last page of the Treaty of Peace and Friendship between Mexico and Spain, signed by José María Calatrava and Miguel Santa María.

The Santa María–Calatrava Treaty, originally named in Spanish as the Tratado definitivo de paz y amistad entre la República Mexicana y S.M.C. la Reina Gobernadora de España (Definitive Treaty of Peace and Friendship between the Mexican Republic and H.C.M. the Queen Regent of Spain), was an international treaty concluded between Mexico and Spain on December 28, 1836.

By this treaty, the Spanish monarchy recognized the existence of the new State of Mexico as a "free, sovereign, and independent nation"; established diplomatic relations; and ended the tensions between both nations that arose from the Mexican War of Independence, which began in 1810. Mexico, in turn, committed to respect Spain's overseas possessions (Cuba, Puerto Rico, Philippines, Carolines, and Marianas). It was signed by Miguel Santa María, on behalf of Mexico, and by José María Calatrava, on behalf of the Kingdom of Spain. It consists of eight articles, an additional secret article, a declaration, and another private secret declaration.

Other nations had already recognized the new Mexican State previously, such as the United Kingdom (Treaty of Amity, Commerce, and Navigation, London, December 26, 1826), the Netherlands (Treaty of Amity, Navigation, and Commerce, London, June 15, 1827), Prussia in 1831, and the United States (which sent its first ambassador to Mexico, Joel R. Poinsett, in October 1822).

== Background ==
Since 1521, a Castilian, Hernán Cortés, with a thousand men, without authorization from the Hispanic monarch, managed to unite the city-states, lordships, and indigenous tribes that were tributaries of the Mexicas or their enemies in the area of influence and borders of the Mexica Empire. The indigenous warriors allied to Hernán Cortés numbered approximately 100,000, managing to take the city of Tenochtitlan, which was the Mexica nerve center in Mesoamerica. Cortés founded a colony there, which later, in 1535, would be elevated to the rank of Viceroyalty, called the Kingdom of New Spain. The Kingdom of New Spain lasted for three centuries before giving way to the First Mexican Empire.

On September 16, 1810, the War of Independence began with the so-called Cry of Dolores (Grito de Dolores). The Mexican insurgents released several documents and manifestos declaring secession from the rest of the Hispanic Empire, which was now in the hands of Napoleon Bonaparte through his brother, who was named king under the name of Joseph I Bonaparte, and who, through the Statute of Bayonne, left the local institutions of the Kingdom of New Spain without representation. This uprising did not seek independence through the creation of a new nation-state, but rather to maintain the Kingdom, not federated to the Hispanic Empire, but to the monarch Ferdinand VII, who was being held captive at the Château de Valençay by Napoleon. However, the first act issued by a provisional congress was the Solemn Act of the Declaration of Independence of Northern America, issued by the Congress of Anáhuac in Chilpancingo on November 6, 1813, in the midst of war. Insurgent struggles by rebel groups continued in different areas, and reading the Declaration highlights that they did not feel bound to the Hispanic monarch who was still in Napoleon Bonaparte's custody, nor did they accept the constitution of the National Assembly of Cádiz of 1812, which in the European zone had assumed the sovereignty corresponding to the monarch and, in his absence, to the institutions of the different territories of each Kingdom.

The independence war was concluded in 1821 with the signing of the Treaty of Córdoba on August 24 and the Declaration of Independence of the Mexican Empire on September 28 of that year. It was the result of negotiations between the different factions participating in the war, including Juan O'Donojú, the last superior political chief of New Spain, representing the monarchy. However, Ferdinand VII and the Cortes would not recognize the treaties and the declaration, considering that O'Donojú was unauthorized to make such arrangements. In a decree published in the Gaceta de Madrid on February 13 and 14, 1822, and made known in Mexico in the Gaceta Imperial on March 28 of the same year, His Majesty's Government declared the Treaty of Córdoba and the subsequent declaration of independence of Mexico invalid.

Even though most of the royalist armies within Mexican territory had laid down their arms and recognized the Treaty of Córdoba, military incursions by Spain to try to reincorporate the territory into the Hispanic empire continued for over a decade. In 1825, the Spanish army garrisoned at San Juan de Ulúa bombarded the port of Veracruz, and Mexican forces forced them to retreat on November 23. Between 1827 and 1829, laws were enacted that resulted in the expulsion of Spaniards from Mexico. The last failed attempt by the Spanish monarchy to reconquer Mexico began on July 27, 1829, culminating in the Battle of Tampico on September 11.

For its part, Mexico had unsuccessfully attempted to capture the island of Cuba, a bastion of the royalist government in the Gulf of Mexico, in order to diminish the Kingdom of Spain's influence over those seas, prevent new incursions, and open an outlet to the Atlantic.

== The treaty ==
In 1833, King Ferdinand VII died. He had ascended to the throne shortly before the start of the Spanish American wars of independence, which left the Iberian Peninsula in a terrible economic situation. He was succeeded by his daughter Isabella II, who was a minor at the time, so her mother Maria Christina assumed the regency of the kingdom, coinciding with the outbreak of the First Carlist War, due to a succession conflict with Carlos María Isidro de Borbón, Ferdinand VII's brother. Because of this, Maria Christina decided to adopt a more liberal stance regarding her government to garner popular support. This would also be reflected in a more open posture regarding relations with the new American nations to promote trade and reactivate the damaged Spanish economy.

Another influence for the signing of this treaty was Mexico's efforts before the Holy See to obtain recognition as a sovereign state, carried out by the priest Francisco Pablo Vázquez. The Holy See would grant this recognition to Mexico on November 29, 1836, that is, a month before the signing of the Santa María-Calatrava treaty.

In 1835, Mexico, also facing severe internal problems (Zacatecas Rebellion and Texas Independence), appointed Miguel Santa María as plenipotentiary minister, who was already a minister in the United Kingdom, to sign the peace treaty. For its part, the Spanish regency appointed José María Calatrava. The treaty was signed in Madrid on December 28, 1836.

In Mexico, the publication of the treaty was made by edict only, following the verification of ratification in both countries on March 4, 1838.

== Bibliography ==
- Arias, Juan de Dios; Olavarría y Ferrari, Enrique de (1880). Riva Palacio, Vicente (ed.). México a través de los siglos: México independiente. Vol. IV. Mexico: Ballescá y compañía.
- Frasquet, Ivana (2002). "Milicianos y soldados. La problemática social mexicana en la invasión de 1829". In Broseta, Salvador; et al. (eds.). Las ciudades y la guerra, 1750-1898. Castelló de la Plana: Publicaciones de la Universitat Jaume I. pp. 115–132. ISBN 84-8021-389-2.
- Zárate, Julio (1880). Riva Palacio, Vicente (ed.). México a través de los siglos: La Guerra de Independencia. Vol. III. Mexico: Ballescá y compañía.
