= Plan of Iguala =

1821 proclamation of Mexican independence from Spain

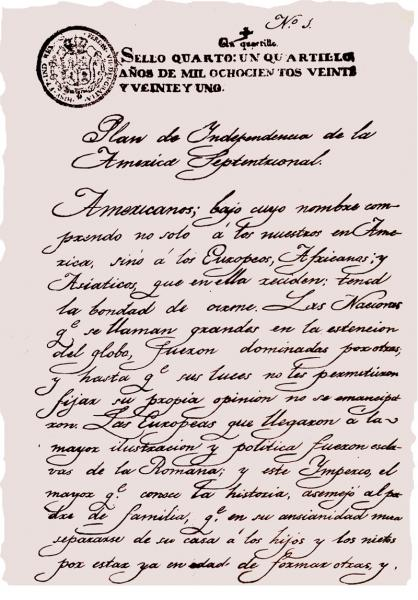
- Created: 24 February 1821
- Ratified: 24 August 1821
- Date effective: 25 August 1821
- Location: Iguala, Mexico
- Signatories: Agustín de Iturbide, Vicente Guerrero
- Purpose: Establish the form of Mexican independence

The Plan of Iguala, also known as the Plan of the Three Guarantees ("Plan Trigarante") or Act of Independence of North America, was a revolutionary proclamation promulgated on 24 February 1821, in the final stage of the Mexican War of Independence from Spain. The Plan stated that Mexico was to become a constitutional monarchy, whose sole official religion would be Roman Catholicism, in which both the Peninsulares (people born in Spain and residing in Mexico) and the Americanos (people born in Mexico, that is, the Americas) would enjoy equal political and social rights. It took its name from the city of Iguala in the modern-day state of Guerrero.

The two main figures behind the Plan were Agustín de Iturbide (who would become Emperor of Mexico) and Vicente Guerrero, revolutionary rebel leader and later President of Mexico. The Army of the Three Guarantees was formed by the unified forces of Iturbide and Guerrero to defend the ideals of the Plan of Iguala. On 24 August 1821, Iturbide and Spanish viceroy Juan O'Donojú signed the Treaty of Córdoba in Córdoba, Veracruz, ratifying the Plan of Iguala, and thus confirming Mexico's independence.

The Plan, a compromise, introduced new ideas and preserved others. For example, it established a new army, but it preserved the constitutional right of all males to vote regardless of place of birth, ethnic origin, or economic condition, which had been enshrined in the Constitution of 1812 and which was in force at the time of the Plan.

== Three Guarantees ==
Tricolor flag of the Army of the Three Guarantees

The Plan of Iguala established three central principles for the nascent Mexican state: the primacy of Roman Catholicism, the absolute political independence of Mexico, and full social equality for all social and ethnic groups in the new country. These are the "Three Guarantees" by which the Plan is sometimes known, summarized as "Religion, Independence and Unity" ("Religión, Independencia y Unión"). The tricolor flag of the Army of Three Guarantees is a symbolic representation of the three guarantees, and is the colour scheme for the post-independence red, green, and white Mexican flag.

The document explicitly includes all residents of Mexico's geographic territory among its citizens: the preamble refers to "Americans, under which term are included not only those born in America, but Europeans, Africans and Asians who reside in it," and Article 12 states: "All the inhabitants of the Mexican Empire, without any other distinction besides merit and virtue, are suitable citizens to apply for any employment," or "All the inhabitants of New Spain, without any distinction between Europeans, Africans, nor Indians, are citizens of this Monarchy with option to all employment depending on their merit and virtues," depending on the copy.

== Aftermath ==
Although the Spanish Viceroy had ratified the Treaty of Córdoba, the Spanish Congress meeting in Madrid on 13 February 1822 repudiated the Treaty as "illegal, null, and void." The Mexican government, however, insisted upon O'Donojú's acceptance of the Plan as legally establishing the country's independence and sovereignty. Spain responded with a series of efforts to reconquer Mexico over the following decade. It eventually recognized Mexico's independence on 28 December 1836 by the Santa María–Calatrava Treaty, signed in Madrid by the Mexican Commissioner, Miguel Santa Maria, and the Spanish state minister, Jose Maria Calatrava.

Following the fall of Iturbide's empire, the Mexican Congress abrogated both the Plan of Iguala and the Treaty of Córdoba as the basis for the government on 8 April 1823. Instead, a new constitutional convention was called which led to the adoption of the 1824 Constitution of Mexico on 4 October 1824.

== See also ==
- Declaration of Independence of the Mexican Empire
- Plans in Mexican history
- History of democracy in Mexico
