= Battle of Tampico (1829) =

Attempted invasion of Mexico by the Spanish Empire

- Part of Spanish attempts to reconquer Mexico
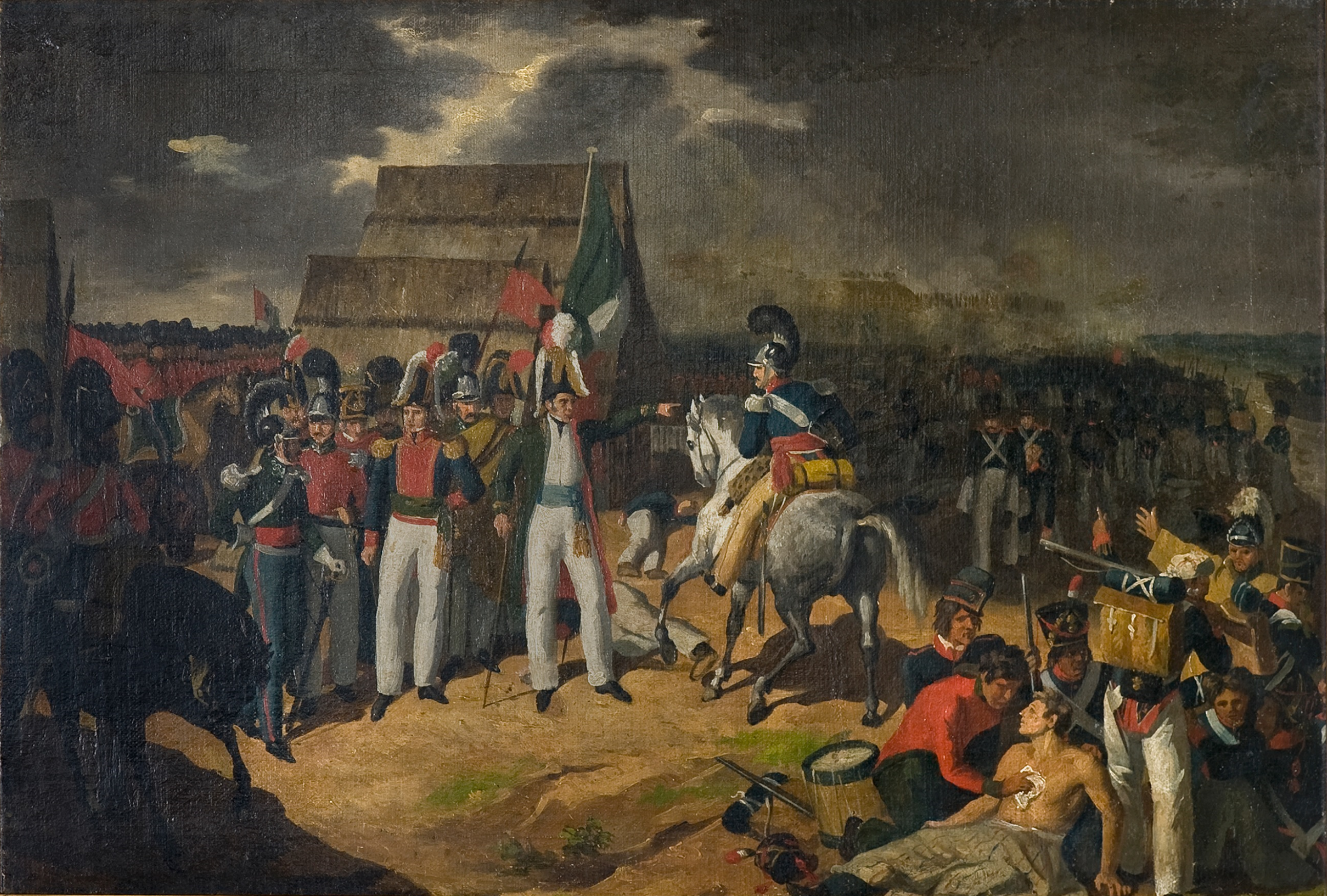
- Military action in Pueblo Viejo, September 1829; Carlos París, 1835
Date	26 July – 11 September 1829
Location	Tampico, Tamaulipas
Result	Mexican victory: Spain recognizes the independence of the United Mexican States in 1836

Belligerents
Mexican Republic	Spain

Commanders and leaders
Antonio López de Santa Anna; Manuel de Mier y Terán	Isidro Barrada (surrendered)

Strength
8,000+ troops: 500 (Tampico garrison); 1,000 (Veracruz reinforcements); 1,500 (early August reinforcements); 5,000 (San Luis Potosí Division); Local militias	3,500

Casualties and losses
215 killed 785 wounded 793 dead from disease	135 killed 151 wounded

The Battle of Tampico, also known as the Barradas Expedition, was a series of military engagements between the First Mexican Republic and the Spanish Empire. Fought from July to September 1829 and culminating on 11 September, it was part of several Spanish attempts to re-establish control over Mexico. The battle was a major victory for Mexico and marked the final battle between Spain and the new Mexican nation.

== Background ==
During the 1810s, revolts broke out in the Spanish colony of New Spain, severely damaging Spanish authority in colonial Mexico. Various issues had caused the rebellions, with many factions eventually determining that New Spain should become independent from Spain and form a new Mexican nation. While the Spanish Empire initially succeeded in suppressing the rebellion, by the late 1810s, the Mexican revolutionaries had established control over much of the country. Mexico achieved its de facto independence with the signing of the Treaty of Córdoba in 1821, but the Spanish government refused to accept the legitimacy of the treaty; Spanish military garrisons remained in Mexico until 1825, and the Spanish navy used the nearby island of Cuba as a base from which to attack Mexican shipping in the Gulf of Mexico.

As early as 1822, Spanish military commanders envisioned a reconquest of Mexico. The liberal faction holding power in the Spanish Parliament delayed early plans. However, by 1823, the power of the Spanish throne had been restored, and invasion plans began in earnest. Potential landing points for the invasion included Veracruz, Campeche, Tampico, or the Yucatán peninsula. Invasion plans called variously for several thousand to twenty-five thousand troops and often included the addition of Spanish volunteers recently exiled from Mexico. Many Spanish planners thought the Mexican populace would not support the Mexican government, so disease (especially yellow fever) and distance were considered the largest obstacles to any invasion.

Ferdinand VII signed the order to invade Mexico in April 1829. Planning for the invasion took place over the summer months in Havana, where an invasion fleet was gathered, eventually choosing to land at the port of Tampico. An invasion force of several warships, 15 supply ships, and 3500 men led by General Isidro Barrada sailed from Havana on 5 July. The fleet took three weeks to sail to the Mexican coast, where a hurricane scattered it, instead landing in Cabo Rojo, just outside Tampico.

Mexican officials first learned of invasion rumors in early 1829 from the Mexican consulate in New Orleans. While the Spanish invasion force was inbound from Cuba, the Mexican government tried to strengthen its coastal defenses. However, it remained unaware of where it would land.

== Battle ==
The Spanish landed on Cabo Rojo on 26 July and, by 29 July, began their advance on Tampico. The army advanced north along the coast for the next several days, occasionally skirmishing with and coming under fire from Mexican forces. News of the Spanish landing reached the Mexican government on 2 August, spurring the government to call on state governors to raise militias. As the Spanish had not instituted a naval blockade, Mexican General Antonio López de Santa Anna could sail north from Veracruz with 1000 men to reinforce Tampico. Mexican authorities evacuated the city of Tampico to ensure the Spanish could not recruit collaborators from the town.

Barrada continued to advance into early August, winning minor skirmishes against Mexican forces and capturing Tampico Alto. The Spanish reached Tampico on 5 August and occupied the port soon after, but not before the Mexican defenders had evacuated and stripped the town of all supplies. After their withdrawal, Mexican forces consolidated in Altamira to wait for more reinforcements. Santa Anna arrived on 11 August, moving the Mexican army to the mouth of the Pánuco River, just north of Tampico. On the 15th, Barrada ordered the Spanish fleet to set sail for Cuba to gather reinforcements. He began to send foraging parties into the nearby countryside, resulting in skirmishes with Mexican units. The next day, 1800 Spanish soldiers advanced northwards toward Altamira for supplies, but Mexican skirmishes hindered their advance, and they didn't find any supplies at Altamira. Santa Anna counterattacked on the night of 20 August, unsuccessfully attempting to infiltrate the Spanish positions but successfully withdrawing afterward.

Mexican reinforcements continued to arrive over the next several days while the Spanish built a fort on the left bank of the Pánuco River. Barrada continued to launch probing attacks into the Mexican positions but could not break into the countryside. On 7 September, a large Mexican division of 5000 men arrived to reinforce Santa Ana, while Barrada's army suffered severe attrition from disease and lack of supplies. On 8 September, Santa Anna requested that Barrada surrender unconditionally, which he refused, leading to further negotiations. On the 9th, a large storm disrupted both armies by flooding earthworks and causing many Mexican militiamen to desert; the next day, Santa Anna ordered an attack with his professional troops on the Spanish riverside fort, which the Spanish repulsed with 127 Mexicans dead and 191 wounded compared to 104 Spanish dead and 66 wounded. At 3:00 pm that afternoon, junior Spanish officers decided to draft an instrument of surrender, which Barrada ratified. Under the terms of the surrender, the Spanish army gave up its weapons, was allowed safe passage back to Cuba, and was obliged to sign a vow not to take up arms against Mexico in the future. Barrada departed for New Orleans soon after to secure transport for the army back to Cuba, while Santa Ana was proclaimed a hero in Mexico.

== Aftermath ==
The battle at Tampico was the last major confrontation between the Mexican Republic and the Spanish Empire, with the political situation in Spain aborting future Spanish invasion plans. His army's victory at Tampico made Santa Anna a popular hero in Mexico, a status that would influence his political career. The expedition's defeat convinced many in Spain that Mexico was permanently lost, with one source noting that the defeat moved Spain to accept a more conciliatory stance towards Mexico.

According to Schenoni, the abolition of slavery on September 15, 1829, only four days after victory in Tampico, also shows how the national state momentarily strengthened vis-à-vis hacendados and local elites, but the impact of this dispute was limited and the patriotic fervor did not last long.
