= Treaty of Córdoba =

1821 treaty ending the Mexican War of Independence

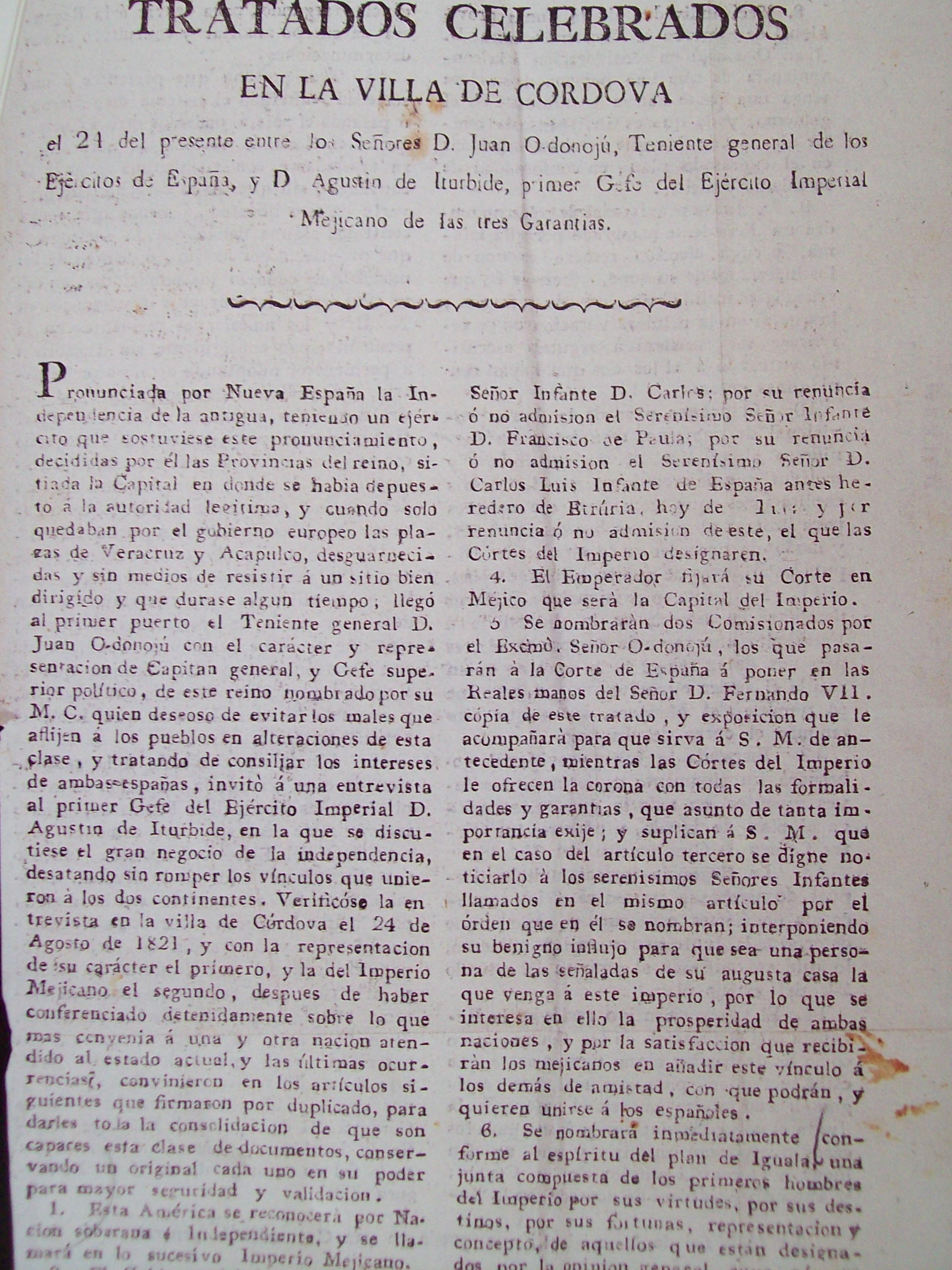
- Signed: 24 August 1821
- Location: Córdoba, Veracruz, Mexico
- Condition: The treaty was rejected by Spain.
- Signatories: (Mexico) Mexican Empire; Kingdom of Spain
- Ratifiers: Agustín de Iturbide, Regent of the Mexican Empire; Juan O'Donojú, High Political Head of Spanish government in Mexico
- Language: Spanish

The Treaty of Córdoba established Mexican independence from Spain at the conclusion of the Mexican War of Independence. It was signed on August 24, 1821 in Córdoba, Veracruz, Mexico. The signatories were the head of the Army of the Three Guarantees, Agustín de Iturbide, and, acting on behalf of the Spanish government, Jefe Político Superior Juan O'Donojú. The treaty has 17 articles, which developed the proposals of the Plan of Iguala. The Treaty is the first document in which Spanish (without authorization) and Mexican officials accept the liberty of what will become the First Mexican Empire, but it is not today recognized as the foundational moment, since these ideas are often attributed to the Grito de Dolores (September 16, 1810). The treaty was rejected by the Spanish government, publishing this determination in Madrid on February 13 and 14, 1822.

== Objectives ==
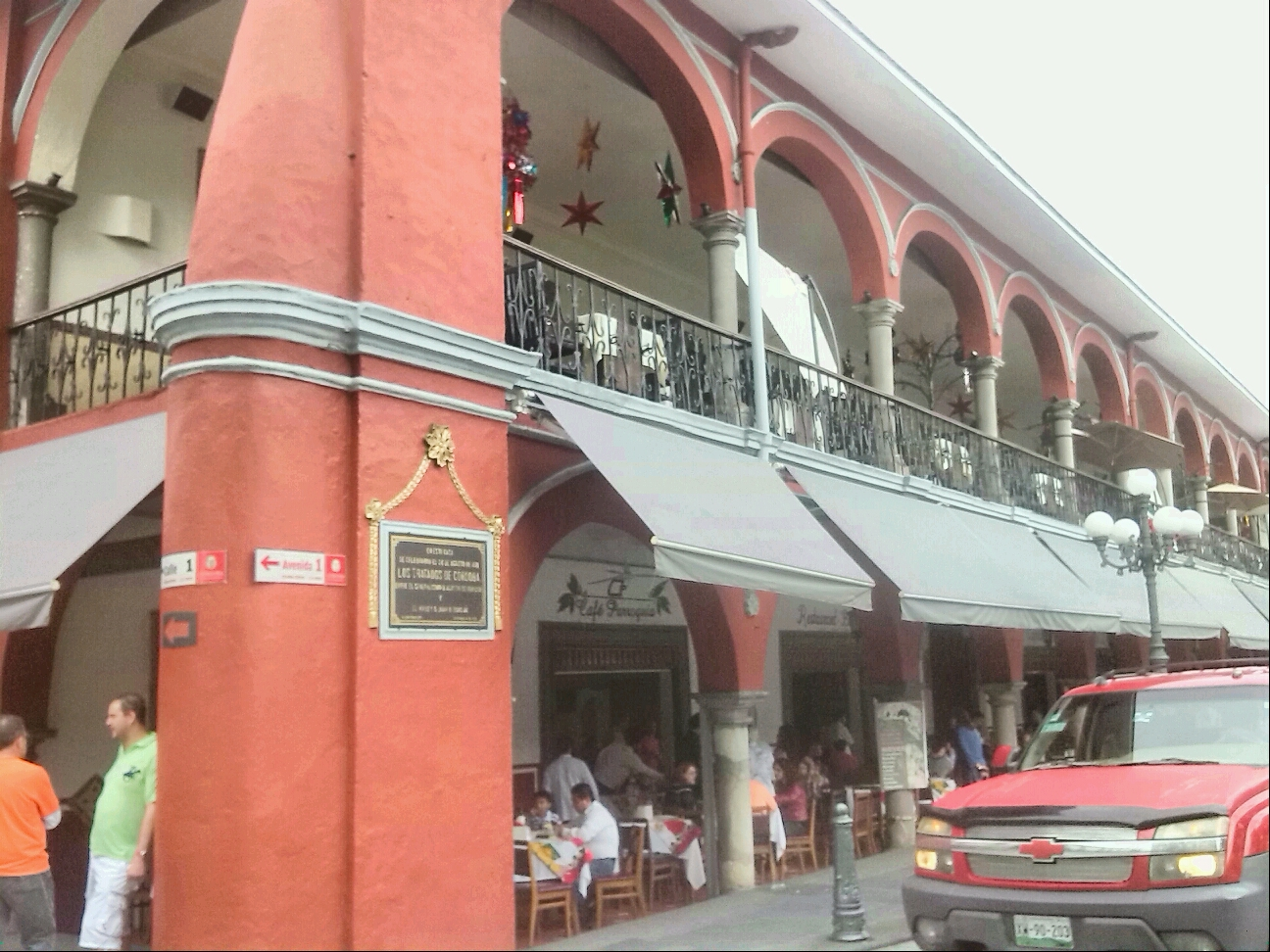
House where the Treaties of Córdoba were signed.

In the treaty, New Spain is recognized as an independent empire, which is defined as "monarchical, constitutional and moderate." The crown of the Mexican Empire was offered first to Ferdinand VII of Spain. Should he not present himself in Mexico within the time to be determined by the Mexican Cortes (parliament) to take the oath of office, the crown would then be offered in sequence to his brothers, the Infantes Carlos and Francisco, and their nephew, Duke Charles Louis or another individual of a royal house, whom the Cortes would determine. In the case that none of these accept the crown, the treaty then established that Cortes could designate a new king without specifying if the person needed to belong to a European royal house.

The idea in this last clause had not been considered in the Plan of Iguala, and was added by Iturbide to leave open the possibility of his taking the crown. At the same time, O'Donojú, as captain general and jefe político superior, had no authority to sign such a treaty, but was interested in preserving Mexico for the Spanish royal family, and probably signed without considering that Iturbide might have designs on the crown.

== Signing and consequences ==
On September 27, 1821, the Army of the Three Guarantees entered triumphantly into Mexico City and on the following day, the Declaration of Independence of the Mexican Empire was widely known. Shortly after, Iturbide suggested to offer the Mexican throne to a member of the House of Bourbon (most likely to Ferdinand VII) but all attempts and offers had failed. Therefore, the Mexican Congress elected a Mexican monarch the following year. Iturbide was proclaimed emperor of Mexico on May 18, 1822. The monarchy lasted three years, and after the republican revolution of Casa Mata, the Congress no longer considered the Plan of Iguala or Treaty of Córdoba in effect.

== See also ==
- Adams–Onís Treaty, 1819 U.S.–Spain treaty regarding border locations
- List of treaties
