= Congress of Chilpancingo =

Legislative body in present-day Mexico

The Congress of Chilpancingo, also known as the Congress of Anáhuac or the Supreme National American Congress, was the first independent legislative body established by the Mexican insurgency during the Mexican War of Independence. Convened by José María Morelos, it succeeded the Suprema Junta Nacional Americana as the supreme political authority of the insurgents. It was installed in Chilpancingo, in the insurgent-held territory Morelos proclaimed as the province of Tecpan, in present-day Guerrero, on 13–14 September 1813.

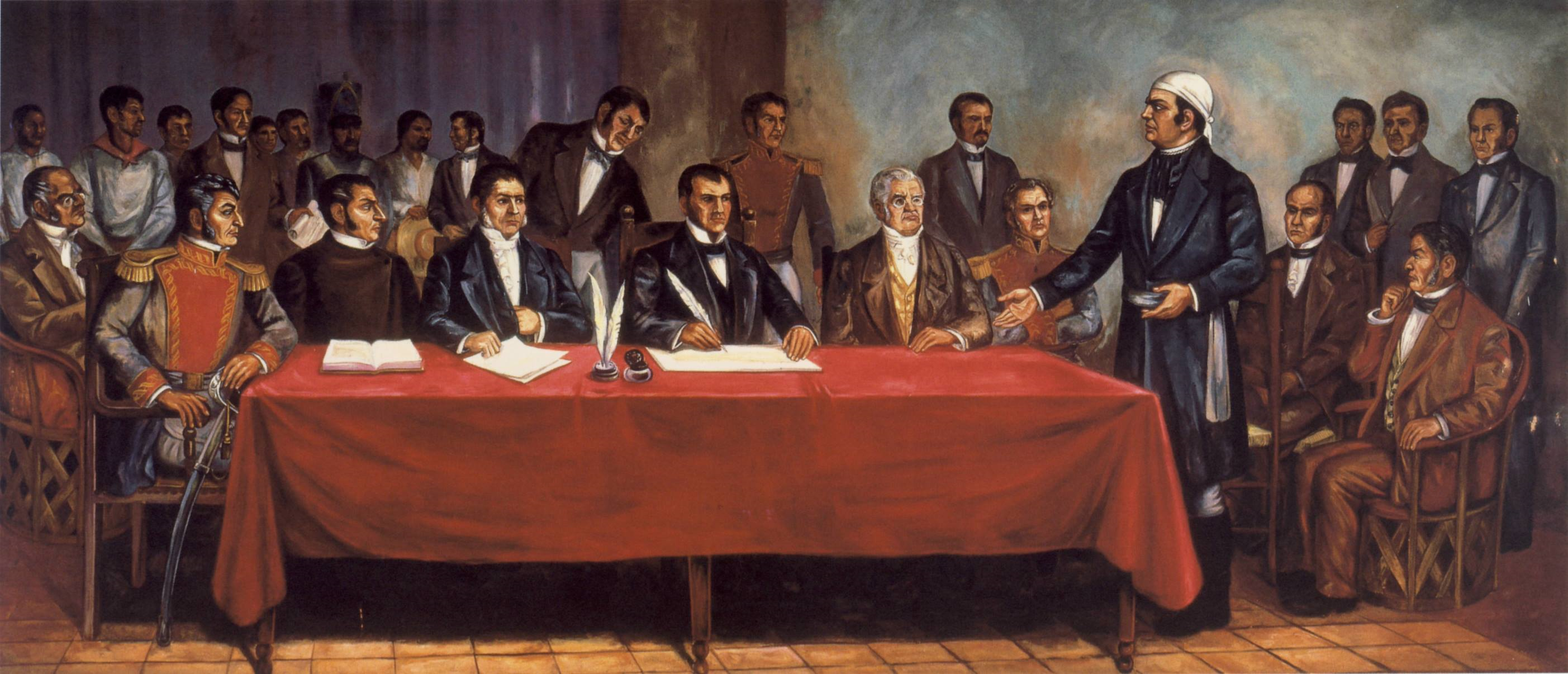
Session of the Congress of Anáhuac. On the foreground, from left to right: Ignacio López Rayón, José Sixto Verduzco, José María Liceaga, Carlos María de Bustamante, Andrés Quintana Roo, and José María Morelos.

At the opening sessions Morelos presented the Sentimientos de la Nación. On 6 November 1813 the deputies signed the Acta Solemne de la Declaración de Independencia de la América Septentrional, the first formal legal instrument declaring independence from the Spanish crown. After royalist pressure forced the Congress to become itinerant, it promulgated the Decreto Constitucional para la Libertad de la América Mexicana on 22 October 1814 in Apatzingán.

The Congress claimed sovereignty over América Septentrional or América Mexicana, corresponding roughly to the continental territories of the Viceroyalty of New Spain. The Congress issued decrees, asserted rights of war and peace, and exercised de facto governmental functions in territories under insurgent control, even though that control remained incomplete and contested.

== Background ==
=== Hidalgo’s government in Guadalajara ===
After the Grito de Dolores, Miguel Hidalgo advanced westward and entered Guadalajara on 26 November 1810, where he established a short-lived insurgent government. From the Cuartel General he issued a series of decrees, including the abolition of slavery, with a ten-day deadline and the death penalty for non-compliance, the suppression of Indigenous and casta tributes, the abolition of stamped paper, and the restitution of community lands to Indigenous peoples. He appointed José María Chico as Ministro de Gracia y Justicia and president of the Audiencia Nacional, and Ignacio López Rayón as Secretario de Estado y del Despacho, effectively a universal minister. The Palacio de Gobierno was restyled as Palacio Nacional and the Real Audiencia as Audiencia Nacional.

On 15 December 1810 Hidalgo published a manifesto in which he called for the creation of a National Congress composed of representatives from all the cities, towns, and places of the realm, charged with maintaining the Catholic religion and issuing laws suited to local circumstances. The government also sponsored the first sustained insurgent newspaper, El Despertador Americano. This administration remained personal and provisional under Hidalgo’s authority; it ended after the defeat at the Battle of Calderón Bridge on 17 January 1811 and the subsequent flight and capture of Hidalgo.

=== The Junta de Zitácuaro ===
After the capture of Miguel Hidalgo, Ignacio López Rayón assumed leadership of remaining forces. On 19 August 1811, in Zitácuaro, an assembly of insurgent generals established the Suprema Junta Nacional Americana, more commonly known as the Junta de Zitácuaro. The initial vocales were López Rayón as president and Universal Minister of the Nation, José María Liceaga, and José Sixto Verduzco; Morelos was later incorporated as a fourth vocal. The Junta sought to provide a central political authority for areas liberated from Spanish control and, at least initially, operated under the formula of defending the authority of Ferdinand VII.

On 2 January 1812, royalist forces under Brigadier Félix María Calleja defeated the insurgents at the Battle of Zitácuaro. The Junta fled and thereafter operated as an itinerant body, passing through Tuzantla, Tlalchapa, Sultepec, and other points. It produced documents such as Rayón’s Elementos Constitucionales, issued in 1812 and circulated from Zinacantepec, which outlined principles including Catholic exclusivity, American independence, and sovereignty deposited in the people while recognizing Ferdinand VII. It also issued the first Mexican coinage stamp and made limited attempts at external recognition. Effective administrative reach remained weak, as local military commanders often acted independently.

== Dissolution of the Junta and transition ==
Internal divisions accelerated the Junta’s decline. Rayón and some members continued to employ the “mask of Ferdinand VII,” while Morelos and others favored a clearer break with the Spanish monarchy and a stronger institutional form. In August 1813, from Puruándiro, Rayón himself described the Junta as nearly dissolved “by execrable plots and passions fermented by clumsiness and intrigue.” Morelos, who controlled substantial territory in the south, issued a call in the summer of 1813 for a congress of provincial representatives. The Junta formally gave way as the supreme political authority upon the installation of the Congress of Chilpancingo in September 1813. Of the former vocales, Verduzco attended promptly; Liceaga joined in late October and Rayón in early November.

== Installation and early sessions ==
Morelos selected Chilpancingo and elevated it to the rank of a city. The Congress was installed on 13 September 1813 in the parish church of Santa María de la Asunción; formal sessions opened the following day. Because complete elections could not be held in every province, the body combined elected deputies, notably José Manuel de Herrera for Tecpan, with proprietary members drawn from the old Junta and substitutes named by Morelos including Carlos María de Bustamante, José María Cos, and Andrés Quintana Roo.

On 14 September 1813, in his opening address, Morelos distanced the new government from the Spanish viceroyalty and invoked the pre-Hispanic Mexican world, stating that “12 August 1521 was followed by 14 September 1813; on the former, the chains of our servitude in Mexico-Tenochtitlan were tightened; on the latter, they were broken forever in the blessed town of Chilpancingo.” He concluded by claiming continuity with the Aztec Empire, stating that the Congress’s purpose was to “restore the Mexican Empire and improve the government.” He presented the Sentimientos de la Nación, a 23-point political program whose principal points included the independence of America from Spain and all other nations or monarchies, popular sovereignty deposited in a national congress, division of powers, abolition of slavery and caste distinctions, exclusive recognition of the Catholic religion, and various social reforms. The document served as a guiding program for subsequent constitutions.

=== Military reorganization ===
Congress sought to convert the fragmented regional insurgent forces into armies operating under a single political authority. The Congress offered Morelos the titles of Generalísimo de las armas de la América Septentrional and “His Serene Highness” He declined the elevated style and preferred to be addressed as Siervo de la Nación (“Servant of the Nation”). On 18 September, from the “Cuartel Universal de América” in Chilpancingo, Morelos ordered that all troops and officers of the southern provinces recognize Lieutenant General Mariano Matamoros as Commander-in-Chief. He simultaneously assigned Manuel Muñiz command over forces in the northern and central provinces. These measures formalized Morelos’s main southern force, often referred to as the Gran Ejército del Sur under the new institutional framework. Matamoros’s division formed a core element of the southern army.

In practice, coordination among regional armies remained incomplete. Morelos’s southern forces constituted the dominant military strength, but other leaders continued to act with substantial autonomy.

== Itinerant period, Constitution of Apatzingán, and the claim of América Mexicana ==
=== Declaration of independence ===
Map of the Viceroyalty of New Spain in 1819. The Mexican insurgency claimed sovereignty over the continental territories.

On 6 November 1813 the deputies signed the Acta Solemne de la Declaración de Independencia de la América Septentrional. Drafted principally by Carlos María de Bustamante, the Act declared that, because of events in Europe, América Septentrional had recovered the exercise of its usurped sovereignty. It proclaimed the permanent dissolution of dependence on the Spanish throne, asserted the right to make laws, wage war and make peace, form alliances, and regulate relations with the Holy See, established Catholicism as the sole religion, and defined opposition as high treason. The document was dated at the “national palace of Chilpancingo.”

=== Constitution of Apatzingán ===
After the Acta of 6 November 1813, royalist pressure forced the Congress to leave Chilpancingo. It became an itinerant body that began to style itself the Supremo Congreso Mexicano. It moved through locations such as Uruapan and Tiripetío before reaching Apatzingán. On 22 October 1814 the Congress, meeting in Apatzingán, sanctioned the Decreto Constitucional para la Libertad de la América Mexicana, commonly known as the Constitution of Apatzingán. The document formalized the institutional structure of the claimed polity of América Mexicana. It established a republican form of government with a weak executive and strong legislature, abolished slavery and caste distinctions, and reaffirmed Catholicism as the sole religion. It created a tripartite executive known as the Supremo Gobierno, composed of three members with equal authority who alternated in the presidency every four months. The initial members were José María Morelos, José María Liceaga, and José María Cos. Most of its lasting institutional work was produced in this phase, under Morelos as head of the executive.

=== National symbols ===
Interpretation of the National war flag.

Interpretation of the parliamentary flag.

In July 1815, while at Puruarán, the Supremo Congreso and Supremo Gobierno issued the first formal decrees on national symbols. On 3 July the Congress established the Gran Sello a silver shield with an eagle standing, snake in its beak, on a fruit-bearing nopal rooted in a lagoon, adorned with war trophies and surmounted by a civic laurel crown with the ribbon “Independencia Mexicana, año de mil ochocientos diez”. The confirmatory decree of 14 July defined three flags: a checkered white and sky-blue war flag with the arms in a white oval on a silver field and a red border; a white parliamentary flag with a sky-blue border, olive branch and sword; and a sky-blue commerce flag with a white border and white cross.

=== Attempts at foreign recognition ===
On the same day the flag and seal decrees were ratified, the Supremo Gobierno under Morelos addressed a letter to President James Madison of the United States requesting recognition of the independence of América Mexicana and the admission of José Manuel de Herrera as minister plenipotentiary. Herrera set out for the United States but was able to reach only New Orleans; from there he forwarded copies of the credentials and the Puruarán letter to Madison in March 1816. No formal recognition followed.

A more concrete external manifestation of the claim occurred on the Texas coast. In September 1816 José Manuel de Herrera, acting as Mexican envoy, proclaimed Galveston island a port of the Mexican Republic, appointed the French privateer Louis-Michel Aury resident commissioner, and raised the rebel flag. Aury used the base for privateering operations against Spanish shipping under the Mexican commission; he resigned the commission on 31 July 1817.

== Junta Subalterna ==
By late 1815 the Congress had decided to transfer its seat toward Tehuacán. Anticipating the need to maintain an institutional presence in its absences, the Supremo Congreso Mexicano, meeting in Uruapan, issued a decree on 6 September 1815 creating the Junta Subalterna Gubernativa Provisional. Members were elected on 21 September 1815. The body was intended as a temporary superior political authority for the central, northern, and western provinces, exercising legislative, executive, and judicial functions under the framework of the Constitution of Apatzingán.

After Morelos’s capture and execution and the dissolution of the Congress in Tehuacán, the Junta Subalterna became the principal remaining institutional expression of the insurgent claim to sovereignty. It operated as a mobile, itinerant government, residing successively in places such as Taretan, Uruapan, Ario, and the fort of Jaujilla in the marshes of Zacapu. Insurgents continued to refer to it in terms continuous with the earlier Supremo Gobierno Mexicano. Its composition changed through attrition, captures, and replacements.

The Junta retained the claim to the independence and sovereignty of América Mexicana. It issued acts of government, administered justice in controlled zones, reviewing cases left by the Supremo Tribunal and handling new ones, coordinated remaining military forces, issued commissions and appointments, including military ranks and commands, and asserted continuity with the institutions established at Chilpancingo and Apatzingán. Its effective reach was limited, yet it persisted as the last organized governmental body of the insurgency until approximately 1820, when it deposited its authority in Vicente Guerrero prior to the Plan of Iguala.

== See also ==
- History of democracy in Mexico
- Solemn Act of the Declaration of Independence of Northern America
- Mexican War of Independence
- Constitution of Apatzingán
