= Slavery in New Spain =

Slavery in New Spain was based mainly on the importation of slaves from Central Africa and West Africa to work in the colony in the enormous plantations, ranches or mining areas of the viceroyalty, since their physical constitution supposedly made them suitable for working in warm areas.

The largest slave traders in Mexican territory were the Portuguese and the English. The countries that controlled the transatlantic slave market in terms of number of slaves shipped were Great Britain, France, and Portugal.

== History ==
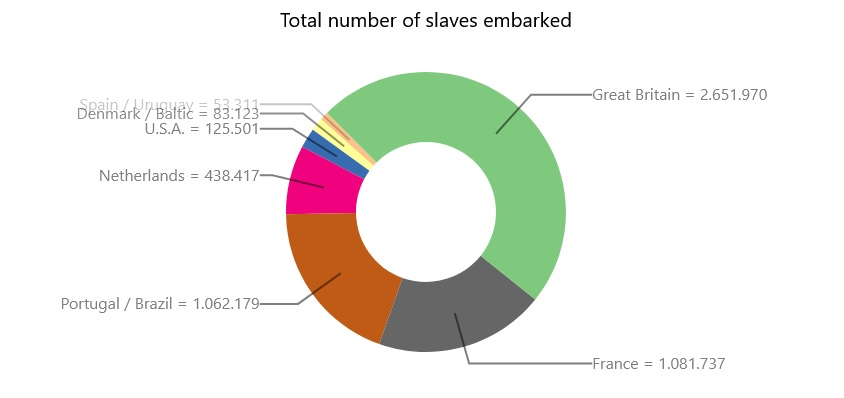
Slaves shipped to America from 1450 to 1800 by country

In 1517, Charles V established a system of concessions by which his subjects in the Americas could use slaves, thus starting the slave trade. When the Spaniards settled in New Spain, they brought some Bantu African workers with them as slaves. For their part, the Dominican friars who arrived in America denounced the conditions of slavery for Native Americans. As did bishops of other orders, they opposed the unjust and illegal treatment before the audience of the Spanish king and in the Royal Commission afterwards.

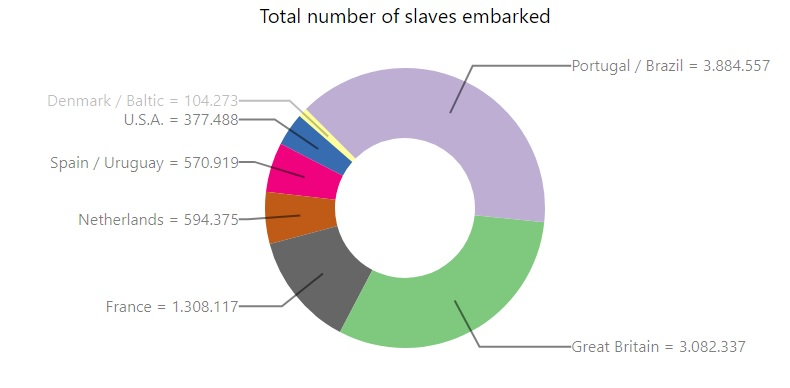
Slaves embarked to America from 1450 until 1866 by country

A bull promulgated by Pope Urban VIII on 22 April 1639 prohibited slavery in the colonies of Spain and Portugal in America. The King of Spain Philip IV of Spain approved the prohibition against enslavement of Indigenous peoples, but allowed it for Bantu Africans. Many slaves gained freedom by escaping and taking refuge in the mountains of Orizaba, Xalapa, and Córdoba in the state of Veracruz, where they became known as Cimarrones, or maroons.

== African slavery ==
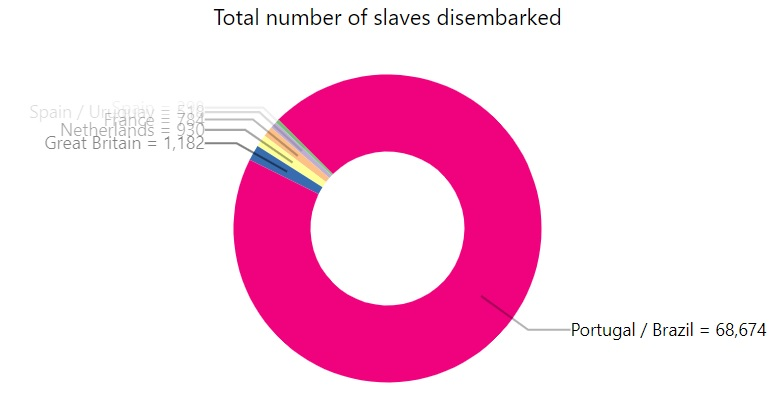
Slaves landed in Mexico by country from 1450 to 1810

In addition to the Native Americans and the Spaniards, Africans constitute the third root of mestizo society in Mexico, which has its origin in New Spain. The international commercial exchanges of that period included humans. Europeans traded in Africa for captives taken in warfare, and began to export them to the Americas. Most of the African population arrived in New Spain as slaves, where they were used for heavy labor. Due to the reduction in the Indigenous population, primarily due to infectious diseases, but also warfare and social disruption, Europeans took millions of people from Africa to be used as enslaved laborers. They disrupted numerous societies by taking their young people in their prime. Many enslaved Africans died during what became known as the Middle Passage, and others in the New World because of harsh conditions, especially in Caribbean colonies and South America.

Slaves from Africa were considered the means to satisfy the demand for labor to develop new lands. Between 1521 and 1594, approximately 36,500 African slaves arrived on Mexican shores. Then from 1595 to 1622, 322 slave ships delivered 50,525 slaves to Mexican ports once again. These slaves represented almost half of the total number of slaves brought to the Spanish West Indies. By 1810, they were about 625,000 free (a differentiation often forgotten) and 10,000 slaves distributed throughout Mexico and along the coasts and in tropical areas. They worked on crops such as sugar cane but also in a variety of trades. Slave societies yielded high profits for the major planters.

Both male and female Africans were enslaved. Males were used for field labor, and physical trades. While women were sometimes used in the fields, they also filled numerous domestic service positions, acting as wet nurses, washerwomen, cooks, maids, seamstresses, or took personal care of masters and mistresses. Elite families usually had male servants to attend to the men.)

Slaves believed that complaining to the Holy Office might give them relief from their harsh conditions. In the absence of effective civil courts where a complaint of mistreatment could be filed, Afro-Mexicans saw the Inquisition as a way to alleviate this miserable situation.

Judicial protection was offered two ways to enslaved Africans in New Spain:

- The first was preventive, consisting of unannounced and sporadic visits to a worksite to record abuses against the labor force, of which slaves formed a significant part.
- The second method was punitive in nature, and occurred when witnesses or the slaves denounced their owner for mistreatment before the Holy Office or audience. However, cases of protection were very rare throughout the colonial period.

== Indigenous slavery ==
The conquest gave rise to the first cases of slavery in New Spain, due to Spanish laws. Before the army of Hernán Cortés went into Colhuacan, the soldiers asked the crown from Veracruz to allow them to send slaves from Spain for the service and sustenance of their troops. They foresaw that, since this was the land they would have to work to conquer for a long time and with many people, some caciques would resist them and would not convert to Catholicism. Cortes asked to be allowed to take and distribute slaves "as is customary in the land of infidels, for it is a very just thing".

Spanish settlers acquired indigenous slaves in New Spain, just as they did in the West Indies. They took as captives those who had been defeated in war, and sometimes they took over control of persons enslaved through warfare of one tribe against another. In the first case, Spaniards imposed slavery on persons who had been free. In the second case, traditional indigenous slavery was replaced by one with certain features of European law. Slaves could be traded under the Spanish regime. To safeguard the master's property, the slaves were marked or branded on the face or body. Legally and in practice, their condition was more disadvantageous than that of the free Indians.

On 14 May 1524, the royal iron arrived in New Spain, sent by the king of Spain to mark (on the leg, buttock, arm, or face) Indian slaves. It was known as the "ransom iron". Subsequently, the prohibition against enslavement of indigenous people by purchase or inheritance was successfully enforced. It was still permitted in the case of war captives. This category included, above all, the indigenous peoples of the north of the country who resisted Spanish rule. The so-called New Laws of 1542 changed conditions for Indians. The Indians were considered to be physically weaker than the Africans, and so attempts were made to protect them.

These laws strictly forbade the practice of slavery in the future and mandated a review of existing cases of servitude. Slavery of Indians for war and ransom was prohibited. However, freedom was granted to those in servitude, and the possibility arose that Spanish law would agree by exception to the captivity of Indians who were hostile to the colonists.

Despite the laws, the exploitation did not disappear. With mortality high because of new infectious diseases, the native population suffered a dramatic decline. They were affected by new diseases carried by both Europeans and Africans. The decline of the indigenous population was serious and to avoid stopping production in 1580, Viceroy Martín Enríquez de Almanza advised the purchase of black slaves on behalf of the king, to distribute them at cost to miners, owners of sugarcane fields and mills and other Spanish businessmen. From then on, the legal introduction of African slaves increased; five thousand a year were authorized for New Spain.

== Abolition ==
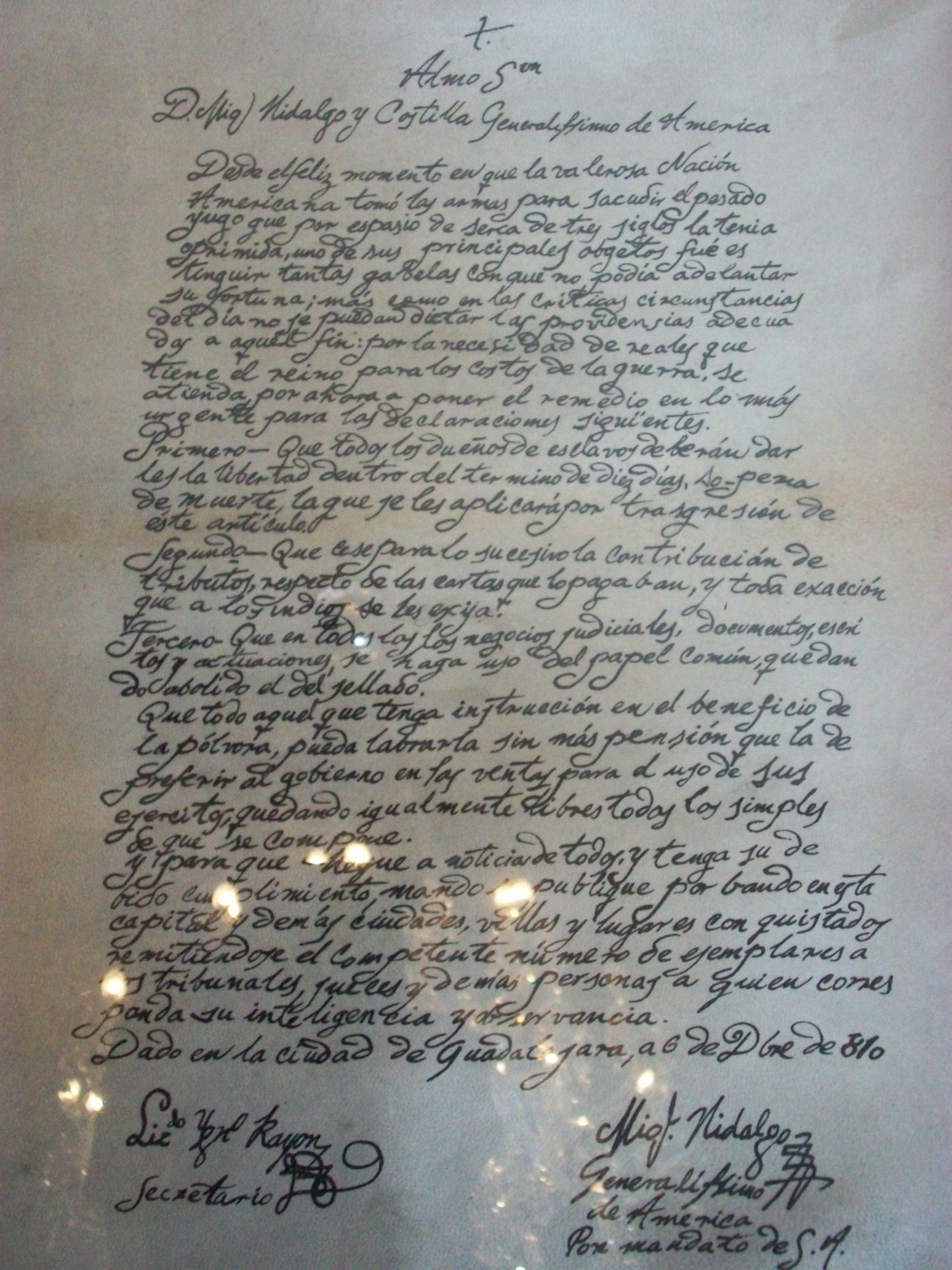
Leather copy of the original of the bando of Miguel Hidalgo y Costilla abolishing slavery in America

People who were enslaved could buy their freedom by obtaining a loan or by being released from their masters before they died. In some cases, slaves escaped and sought refuge in jungles and mountains. As the number of escaped slaves increased, small populations emerged that would be known as Palenques. Freed slaves who feared being subjugated again began to arrive at such sites.

The abolition of slavery was part of the ideology of the insurgents during the Mexican War of Independence. Miguel Hidalgo y Costilla directed that this provision was published by José María Anzorena on October 19, 1810, in Morelia, by Ignacio López Rayón in Tlalpujahua on October 24, 1810, by José María Morelos through the Bando del Aguacatillo on November 17, 1810, and by Miguel Hidalgo through a pamphlet published in Guadalajara on November 29, 1810, who also published and ordered to print the Decreto contra la esclavitud, las gabelas y el papel sellado on December 6, 1810, in the same square. When Hidalgo died, the abolition of slavery was ratified by López Rayón in the Constitutional Elements in April 1812 and by José María Morelos in the Sentiments of the Nation in September 1813. Once Mexico gained independence, former insurgents Guadalupe Victoria and Vicente Guerrero ratified the abolition of slavery through presidential decrees, respectively during their terms of office, on September 16, 1825, and September 15, 1829.

== See also ==
- Afro-Mexicans
- Slavery in Brazil
- Slavery in Colombia
- Slavery in the United States
- New Laws
- Gaspar Yanga

== Bibliography ==
- Carbajal Huerta, Elizabeth "History 2" Third grade. Larousse.
- Esquivel, Gloria (1996). History of Mexico. Oxford: Harla.
- Moreno, Salvador (1995). History of Mexico. Mexico: Ediciones Pedagógicas.
- Villar, Ernesto de la Torre (2000). Temas de la insurgencia (in Spanish). UNAM. ISBN 978-968-36-7804-1.
- Zavala, Silvio (1981). Indian Slaves in New Spain. Edition of the National College. Mexico
- "Africans and descendants in Mexico City in the 17th century" in Rina Cáceres (compiler). Rutas de la esclavitud en América Latina, Costa Rica, Editorial de la Universidad de Costa Rica, 2001
