= Wells of Baján =

Wells of Baján Norias de Baján, Acatita de Baján
- Location in Mexico
- Coordinates: 26.499°N 101.212°W
- Country: Mexico
- State: Coahuila
- Elevation: 840 m (2,760 ft)

Population (2010)
  - Total: 23

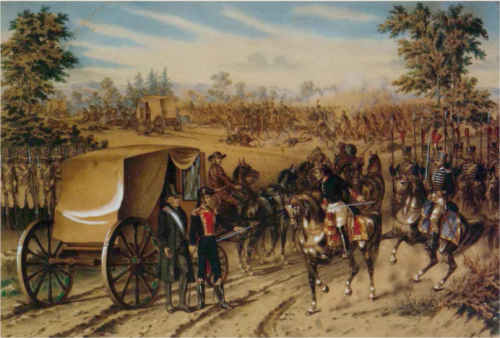
The capture of revolutionary leaders Miguel Hidalgo and Ignacio Allende by Ignacio Elizondo.

Wells of Baján (Spanish: Norias de Baján) are water wells located between Saltillo and Monclova in the northern Mexican state of Coahuila. The small community near the wells is called Acatita de Baján. In the first phase of the Mexican War of Independence, revolutionary leaders Miguel Hidalgo, Ignacio Allende, José Mariano Jiménez, and Juan Aldama, plus nearly 900 men in the rebel army were captured here on March 21, 1811, by 150 soldiers commanded by Ignacio Elizondo. Elizondo pretended to be a supporter of the struggle to overthrow Spanish rule, lured the rebels into a trap, and captured them with little resistance. The four leaders and many of their followers were tried and executed.

== Background ==
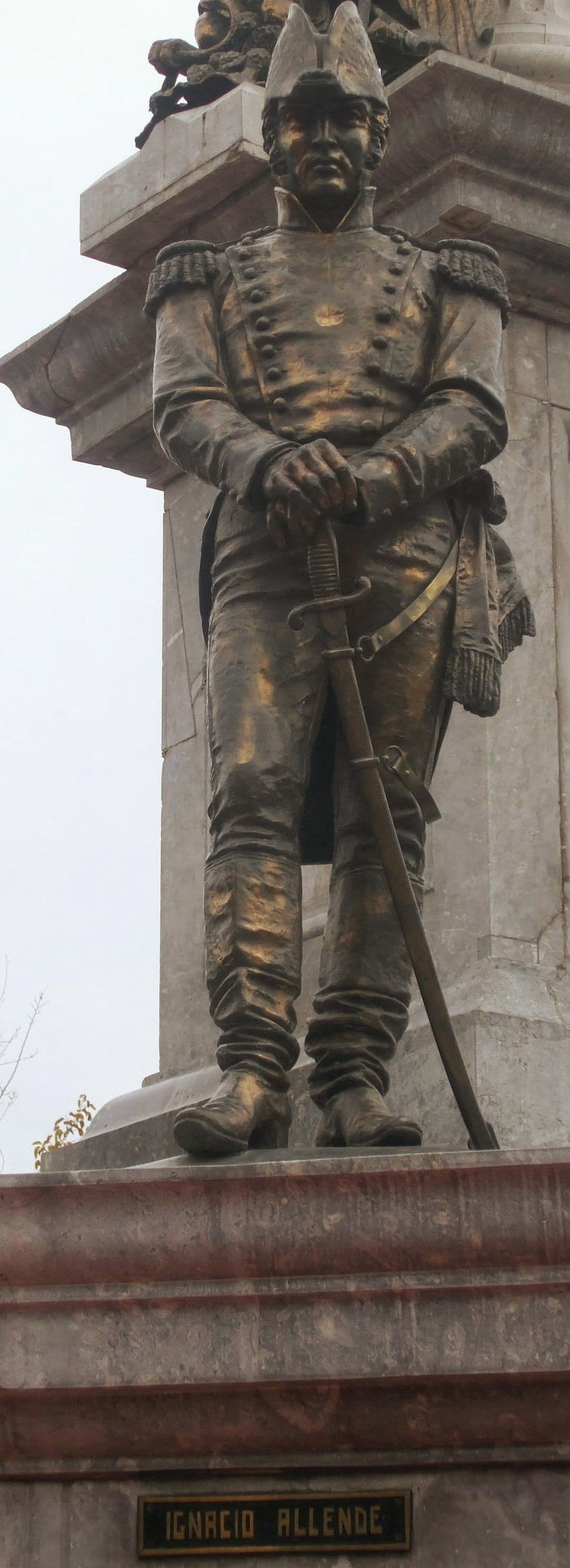
Ignacio Allende.

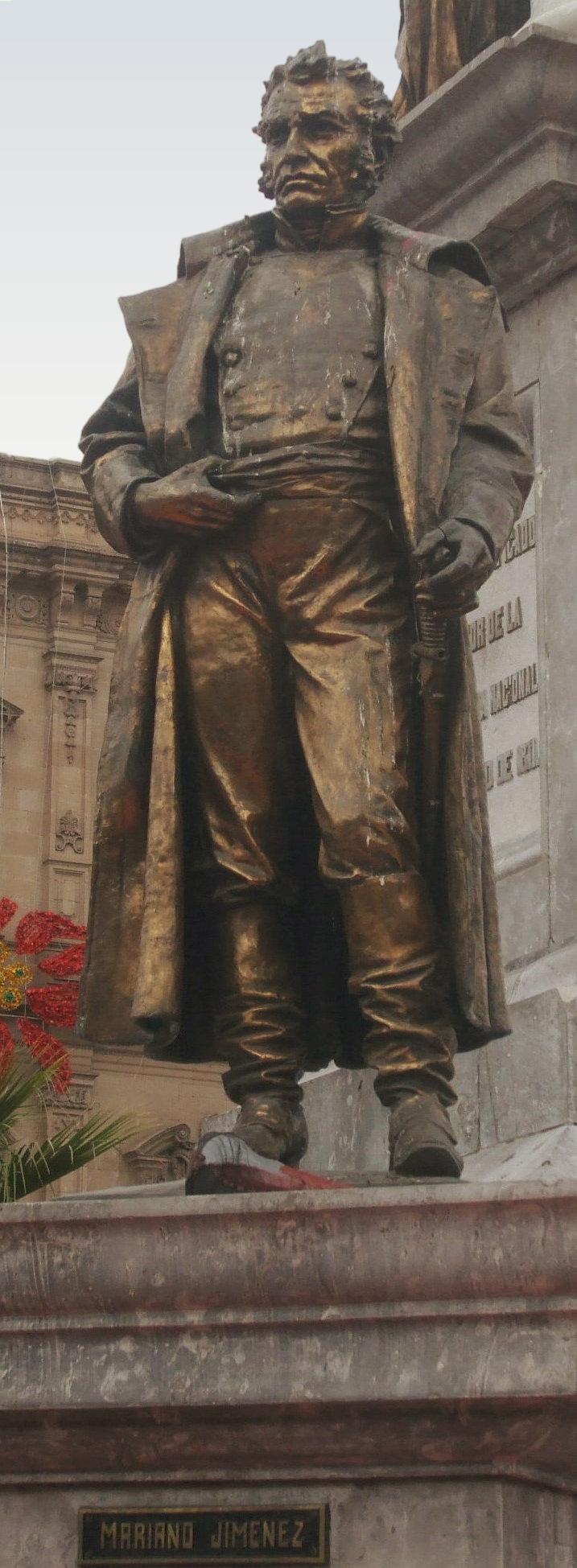
José Mariano Jiménez.

In 1810 Mexico was ruled by Spain and called New Spain. On September 16, Miguel Hidalgo y Costilla, a Roman Catholic priest, triggered the Mexican War of Independence with his speech, called in Mexico the "grito." Among Padre Hidalgo's followers were Ignacio Allende and Juan Aldama, both captains in the Spanish army. A citizen's army, numerous but poorly equipped and trained, quickly formed around these leaders. On September 22, 1810, Hidalgo, who had no military experience, was named by his followers as captain general of the revolutionary army. Allende was second in command with the rank of lieutenant general. The rebel army under Hidalgo enjoyed early successes but was decisively defeated by the royalist army supporting Spanish rule on January 17, 1811, in the Battle of Calderón Bridge near Guadalajara. Along with the remnants of the rebel army, Allende, Aldama and Hidalgo, and others fled northward with the goal of getting to the United States and hoping that they would receive military and financial support from the U.S. The military leaders blamed Hidalgo for the loss at Calderon Bridge, forced him to resign his command, and threatened to execute him if he resisted. Thereafter, Hidalgo was effectively a prisoner of Allende and the rebel army.

Meanwhile, another rebel general, José Mariano Jiménéz, was leading a separate army of 7,000 men from San Luis Potosi toward Saltillo. A royalist force of 700 men chose to defect to Jiménez rather than fight and on January 8, 1811, he entered the city of Saltillo. Jiménez sent out parts of his army to take control of several northern cities, including Parras, Monterrey, and Monclova. To command in Monclova, Jiménez dispatched Pedro de Aranda, 73 years old and a heavy drinker of alcohol. In Monclova, Aranda chose a retired militia officer, Ignacio Elizondo, to take charge of royalist prisoners. Elizondo was converted to the royalist cause by his prisoners, He was asked to continue to pretend he supported the rebels to gain intelligence about the plans of Allende and Hidalgo. The royalist sympathizers in Monclova included a group of large landowners of the region led by José Melchor Sanchez Navarro.

The remnants of the retreating rebel army under Allende and Aldama joined Jiménez in Saltillo on February 24. Hidalgo arrived with a rear guard on March 4 or 5. As royalist armies were advancing on Saltillo, the rebels made plans to continue their flight toward the United States. The principal route to the U.S. was through Monclova and the best source of water en route to Monclova was the Wells of Baján.

The royalist sympathizers in Monclova sent two prominent citizens as spies to Saltillo to ascertain the plans of the rebels. The spies won the confidence of Allende and the other leaders and volunteered to guide the rebels to Texas. They told Allende that Elizondo would meet them the Wells of Baján and escort them to Monclova. In Monclova, the royalists seized key points in the city, capturing the inebriated Aranda, the rebel commander in the city, and blocking all roads out of Monclova to prevent the news that they had taken control from reaching Allende and Hidalgo. Elizondo, his adherence to the royalists unsuspected by the rebels, was sent with 150 men to the Wells of Bajan to capture the rebel leaders.

== Capture ==
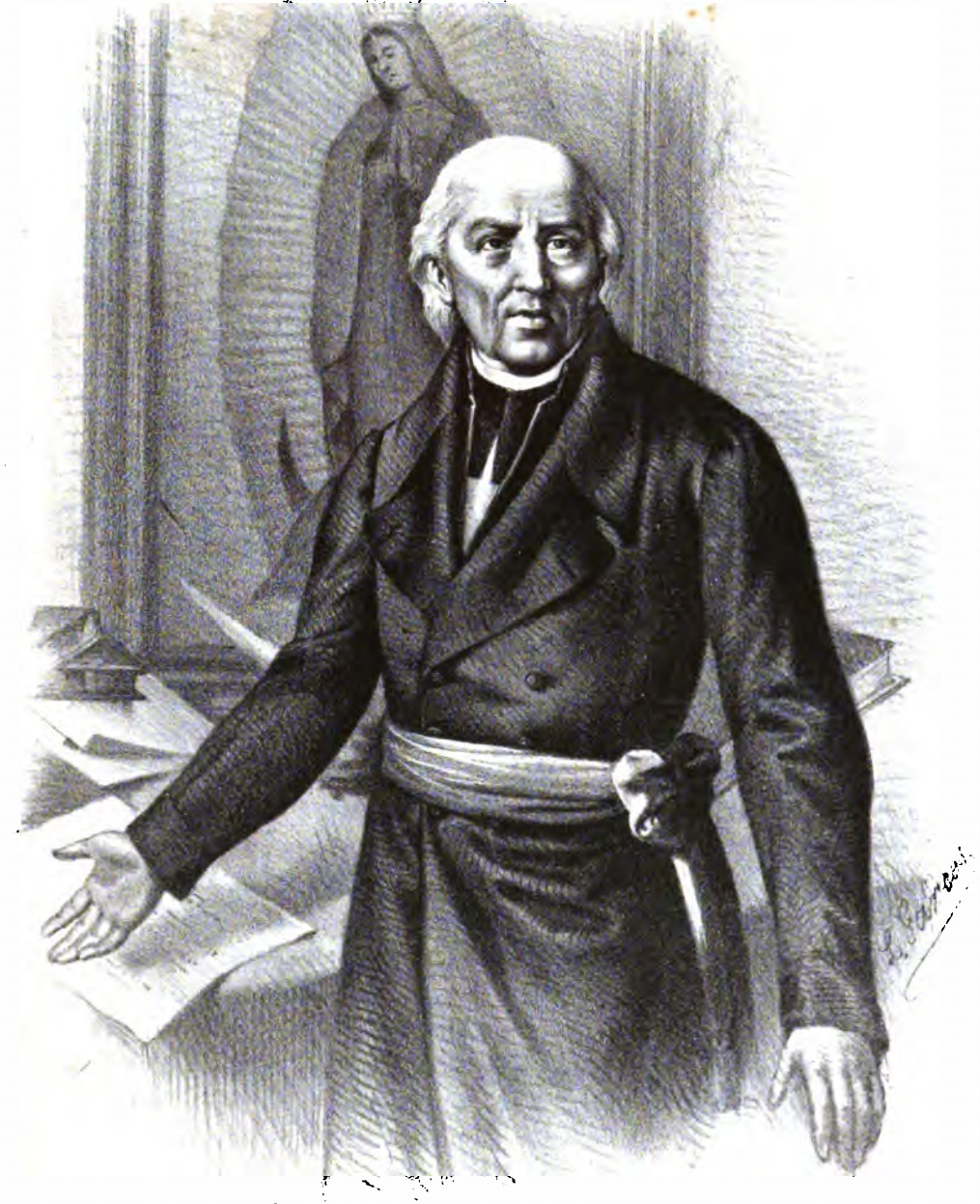
Miguel Hidalgo y Costilla

On March 17, 1811, Generals Allende, Jiménez, and Aldama, Padre Hidalgo, and more than 1,000 soldiers of the rebel army departed Saltillo to march north to Monclova. The caravan was strung out on the road over a distance of 24 kilometres (15 miles). An advance guard led the convoy, followed by more than 20 horse-drawn carriages transporting the rebel leaders. Following the carriages was a mule train with loads of supplies and silver bullion. Next came caissons of artillery, cumbersome ox-drawn carts carrying munitions, and, finally, the bulk of the soldiers and a rearguard. On the evening of March 20, the rebels camped 16 kilometres (9.9 miles) from the Wells of Baján.

At dawn on March 21 a courier arrived with a letter for Jiménez ensuring the unsuspecting rebel general that Elizondo and his soldiers were waiting for them at the Wells of Baján and would welcome the arrival of the rebel army. The courier suggested to Jimenez that, due to shortages of water, the convoy arrive at Baján in stages to allow time for the wells to recharge after each draw down of water. He also suggested that the leaders arrive first so that they could continue rapidly on toward Monclova. Jimenez accepted the suggestion and the convoy set out that morning toward Baján without scouts or outriders and arrived at the Wells of Baján piecemeal.

Elizondo greeted the rebel leaders with an honor guard. He led the carriages behind a nearby hill not visible from the remainder of the rebel convoy. There, his men demanded the surrender of the rebel leaders. Padre Hidalgo, on horseback, drew a pistol but was restrained from firing by a royalist soldier. Allende and Jimenez were in the fifth carriage, and Allende opened fire. In the return fire Allende's son and several rebel soldiers were killed. The royalists tied the hands of the rebel leaders and their escorts and escorted them to a makeshift prison camp. This process of capturing elements of the rebel army continued all day long. As each new element arrived they were taken captive by Elizondo's men. By the end of the day the royalists had 893 prisoners and had killed about 40 of the royalists who resisted. The rear guard was the only contingent in the rebel army which sensed the danger and escaped capture.

The next day Elizondo divided the prisoners into three groups: the leaders of the rebels including Padre Hidalgo; captured rebel clergymen, and the common soldiers. All prisoners were taken to Monclova first and the lesser offenders remained there for trial. Ten captured clergymen were taken to Durango and 27 military leaders and Hidalgo were taken to Chihuahua for trial.

== Trial and executions ==
Allende, Aldama, and Jiménez were tried and found guilty in May 1811 and executed by firing squads and decapitated on July 26, 1811, Another leader, Mariano Abasolo, escaped execution due to his public denouncement of the insurgent cause and the intervention of his wife, María Manuela Rojas Taboada, whose family had connections with aristocrats of the Viceroyalty of New Spain. He was instead sentenced to life in prison in the Santa Catalina Castle at Cádiz, Spain, where he died of pulmonary tuberculosis April 14, 1816. Hidalgo was tried by the Mexican Inquisition by the bishop of Durango, Francisco Gabriel de Olivares, for an official defrocking and excommunication on 27 July 1811. He was then tried by a military court that found him guilty of treason and he was executed on July 30, 1811. There are many theories about how he was executed, the most famous that he was killed by firing squad and then decapitated on July 30 at 7:00 in the morning.

Before his execution, he thanked his jailers, two soldiers, Ortega and Melchor, for their humane treatment. At his execution, Hidalgo stated, "Though I may die, I shall be remembered forever; you all will soon be forgotten." Hidalgo is often called the "Father of Mexican Independence" and September 16, the date of his "grito" is celebrated as Mexico's independence day.

== Aftermath ==
Rafael Iriarte was the only senior rebel leader who escaped the encounter at the Wells of Baján and he delivered the news to Hidalgo's secretary, Ignacio López Rayón, who had remained in Saltillo while the insurgent leaders marched north. Iriarte was subsequently executed according to the previous instructions left by Allende, based on suspicions such as having freed General Felix Maria Calleja's wife. On 26 March 1811, the insurgent army in Saltillo, numbering about 3,500 men with 22 cannons, fled southward. López Rayón would go on to meet with Jose Maria Morelos and other insurgent leaders to establish a prototypical governing body known as the Council of Zitácuaro to continue the struggle for independent against the vice-regal structure.

The four heads of the executed insurgent leaders were hung from the corners of the Grain Exchange Alhóndiga de Granaditas in Guanajuato, to discourage the independence movement. The heads remained hanging for ten years, until Mexico achieved its independence in 1821. Their bodies were then taken to Mexico City and eventually put to rest under el Ángel de la Independencia in 1910.

Of the more than 800 common soldiers and junior leaders captured several hundred were executed in Monclova; others were sentenced to work in mines and on haciendas scattered around Coahuila.
