= Battle of Zacatecas (1811) =

- Part of the Mexican War of Independence
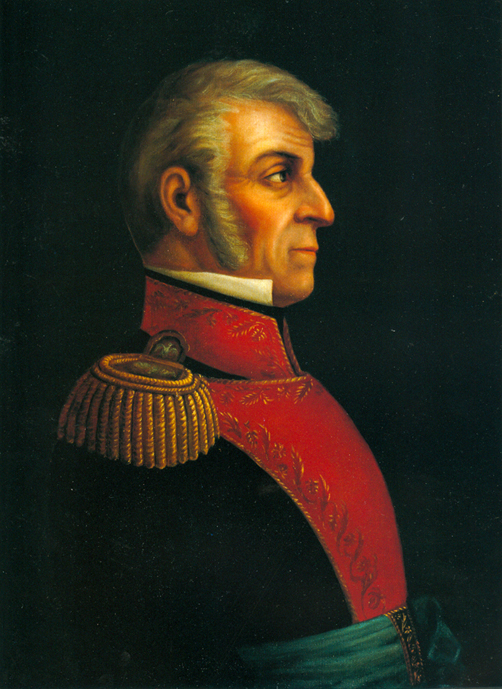
- A portrait of General Ignacio López Rayón who commanded the Mexican insurgents in the battle.
Date	15 April 1811
Location	Zacatecas, Zacatecas, Mexico
Result	Victory for the Mexican insurgents

Belligerents
Mexican Rebels	Spanish Empire

Commanders and leaders
Ignacio López Rayón	José Manuel de Ochoa

The Battle of Zacatecas was a military action of the Mexican War of Independence fought on 15 April 1811 at Zacatecas. The battle was fought between the royalist forces loyal to the Spanish crown and the Mexican rebels fighting for independence from the Spanish Empire. The Mexican insurgents were commanded by General Ignacio López Rayón and the Spanish by José Manuel de Ochoa. The battle resulted in a victory for rebel forces.

== Context ==
Following the retreat of Miguel Hidalgo y Costilla and an army of insurgents to the north of Mexico after their defeat at the Battle of Calderón Bridge on 16 March 1811, a meeting of the rebel leaders was convened in Saltillo, Coahuila. The meeting was convened for the purpose of naming a leader to coordinate the rebel forces from a base in the north with the end goal of achieving Mexican independence. Despite being career soldiers, both Mariano Abasolo and Joaquín Arias turned down nominations for the position. Eventually, Ignacio López Rayón was named supreme chief of insurgent forces and José María Liceaga his second in command.

== The battle ==
After hearing news of the capture of insurgent commanders in Acatita de Baján, López Rayón left Coahuila on 26 March and made way with his forces to Zacatecas. His march to Zacatecas was pursued by the Royalist army of José Manuel Ochoa who López Rayón defeated at the Battle of Puerto de Piñones. The victory was not decisive and the Royalist army continued to harass the insurgents until they were defeated again at Zacatecas on 15 April 1811. López Rayón took the town of Zacatecas and used it as an industrial base to produce artillery, gunpowder, and uniforms for his soldiers.

== Aftermath ==
After his capture of Zacatecas, López Rayón marched to La Piedad, Michoacán, where he joined his forces together with those of José Antonio Torres.

== See also ==
- Mexican War of Independence
- Zacatecas, Zacatecas

== Bibliography ==
- Bustamante, Carlos María de (1846). Cuadro histórico de la revolución mexicana, comenzada en 15 de septiembre de 1810 por el ciudadano Miguel Hidalgo y Costilla, Cura del pueblo de los Dolores (in Spanish). México DF: Impr. de JM Lara.
