= Solemn Act of the Declaration of Independence of Northern America =

Mexican legal document

Territory of Northern America declared independent. (Northern border from later Adams–Onís Treaty.)

The Solemn Act of Northern America's Declaration of Independence (Spanish: Acta Solemne de la Declaración de Independencia de la América Septentrional) is the first Mexican legal historical document which established the separation of Mexico from Spanish rule. It was signed on November 6, 1813, by the deputies of the Congress of Anáhuac, organized by General José María Morelos in the city of Oaxaca in June of that same year, and later installed in the city of Chilpancingo on September 13.

The document gathers some of the main political uprisings contained in "Feelings of the Nation" (Sentimientos de la Nación), a document of the speech Morelos gave to the representatives of the free provinces of southern New Spain on September 14.

This document indicated that given the circumstances in Europe, with the occupation of Spain by the Napoleonic army, made Spanish America recover its sovereignty from the Crown of Castile in 1808, when Ferdinand had been deposed, and therefore, any union between the overseas colonies and the Peninsula had been dissolved. That was a legal concept that was also invoked by the other declarations of independence in Spanish America, such as Venezuela (1811) and Argentina (1816), which were responding to the same events.

The resulting state would be a successor to the Viceroyalty of New Spain and would preserve all of its territory in North America (América Septentrional). The Solemn Act defined penalties for those people who contravene the insurgent war or for those who refused to give their financial support. The Act also recognized Catholicism as the sole official religion of the nation.

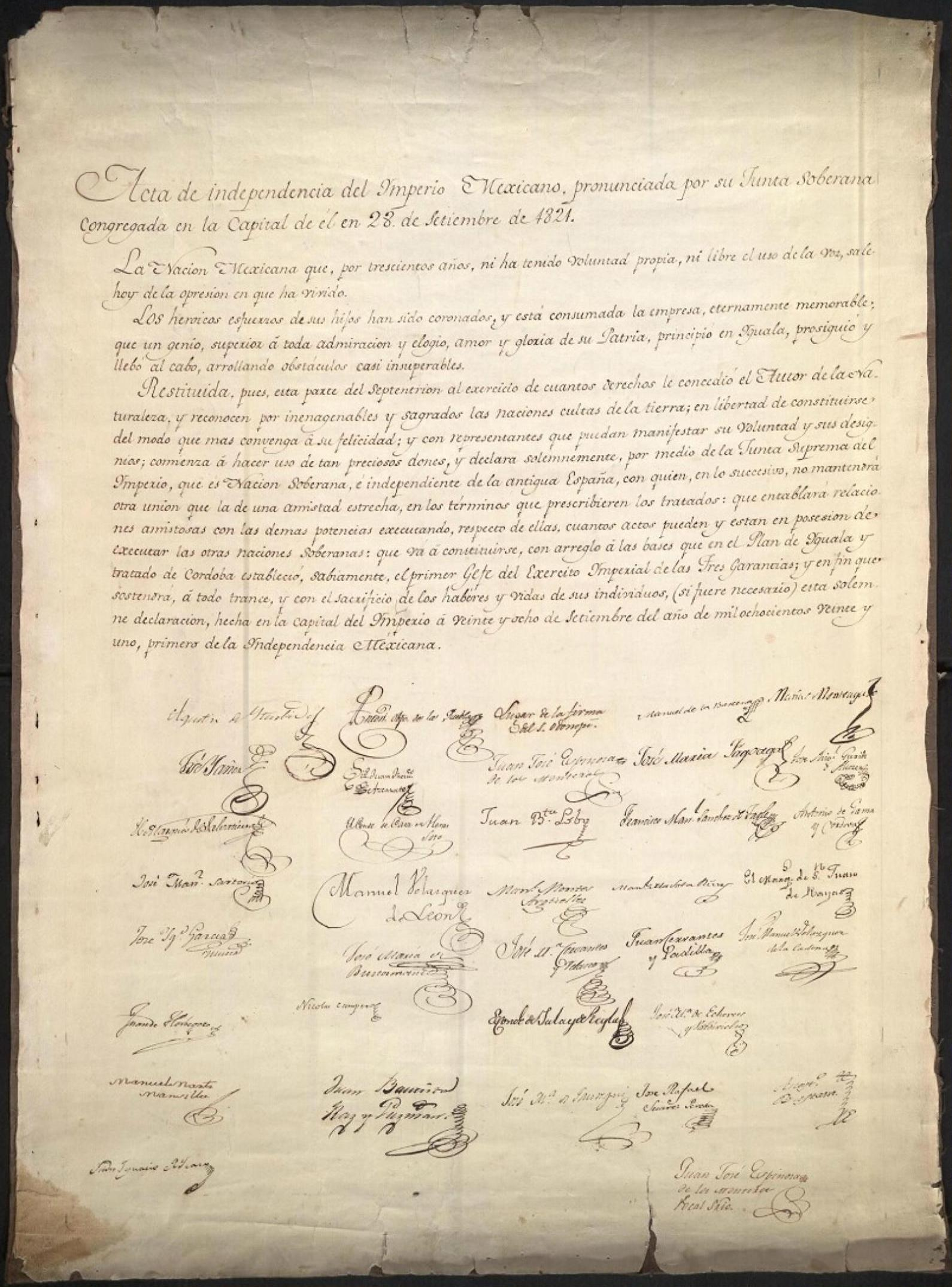
Photograph of the original 1821 Declaration of Independence of the Mexican Empire, the founding document of the Mexican nation.

It was signed by:

- Andrés Quintana Roo
- Ignacio López Rayón
- Carlos María Bustamante
- José Manuel de Herrera
- José Sixto Verduzco
- José María Liceaga
- Cornelio Ortiz de Zárate

== See also ==
- Congress of Chilpancingo
- Sentimientos de la Nación
- Constitution of Apatzingán
- Declaration of Independence of the Mexican Empire
- History of democracy in Mexico
