= Juan Valdivia (insurgent soldier) =

Juan Valdivia was a soldier in the struggle for Mexican independence. He performed the feat of serving as a "human cannon carriage" in battle, becoming El soldado cureña (the carriage soldier).

== Cannon carriage ==
During the Battle of Oaxaca, general Ignacio Rayón led a revolt against the Spanish Royal Forces. Cannons were a valuable weapon as they were an excellent way of attacking bastions or reducing infantry forces. On April 14, 1811 Rayón's insurgent troops assaulted a hacienda in the Cerro del grillo (Cricket Hill), near Zacatecas, where the royal forces had hidden themselves to resist the armies.

Rayón's contingency were armed only with rifles. During the attack, the insurgents found a small cannon whose wooden carriage had been burnt.

Juan Valdivia offered to carry the cannon on his back. Valdivia took position. After placing some rags on his back the cannon was placed on his back and was held while the powder and cannonball were loaded. He turned to point the cannon towards the enemy and the cannon was fired. He fell and suffered multiple back fractures.

The cannon was then reloaded and fired again shattering the enemies' walls and assuring the victory, costing Valdivia his life.

== Sources ==
- "Juan Valdivia - El soldado cureña" (in Spanish). TARATARA.
