= Calera de Víctor Rosales =

Municipality of Calera de Víctor Rosales Calera
- Municipality
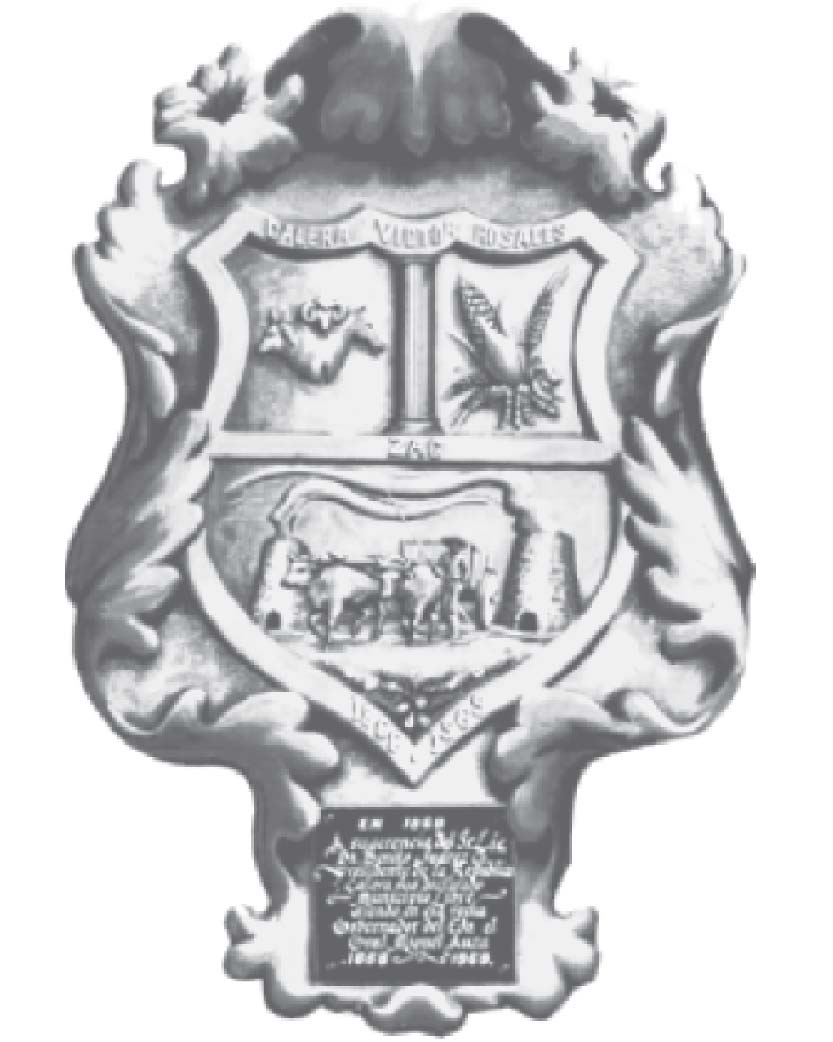
- Coat of arms

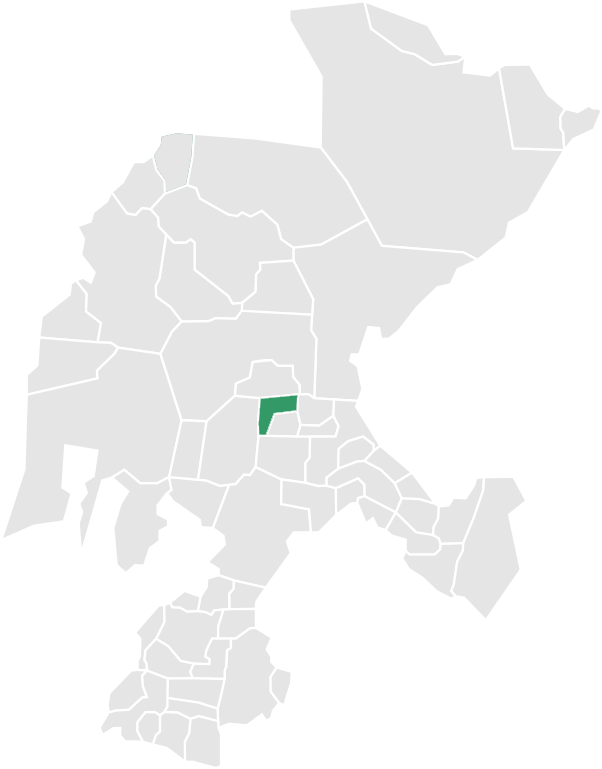
- Location of Calera within Zacatecas and Mexico

- Location within Mexico
- Coordinates: 23°26′02″N 102°55′10″W
- Country: Mexico
- State: Zacatecas
- Municipal seat: Víctor Rosales
- Largest city: Víctor Rosales
- Municipality: 1868

Government
  - Municipal President: L. C. Rodrigo Saucedo Ramirez, PRI

Area
  - Total: 389 km^{2} (150 sq mi)
- Elevation: 2,174 m (7,133 ft)

Population (2005)
  - Total: 36,106
  - Largest city: 29,626 Víctor Rosales
- Time zone: UTC-6 (CST)
- Postal Code: 98500-98508, 98510, 98515, 98520
- Area code: 478
- Website: http://www.calera.gob.mx/

Calera is one of the 58 municipalities in the Mexican state of Zacatecas. It is located on the central part of the state of Zacatecas and it is bounded by the municipalities of General Enrique Estrada, Fresnillo, Villa de Cos, Pánuco, Morelos and Zacatecas. The municipality covers a total surface area of 389 square kilometers (150 sq mi). The municipality comprises 0.5% of the area of the state of Zacatecas.

== History ==
Calera was born as a point of pass from Fresnillo and Zacatecas. It was named in honor of the hero of independence Víctor Rosales.

== Geography ==
Calera is located on the central part of the state of Zacatecas and it is bounded by the municipalities of General Enrique Estrada, Fresnillo, Villa de Cos, Pánuco, Morelos and Zacatecas. The municipality covers a total surface area of 389 square kilometers (150 sq mi).

=== Climate ===
Climate data for Victor Rosales (1951–2010)
Month	Jan	Feb	Mar	Apr	May	Jun	Jul	Aug	Sep	Oct	Nov	Dec	Year
Record high °C (°F)	30.5 (86.9)	29.0 (84.2)	32.5 (90.5)	33.0 (91.4)	37.5 (99.5)	36.0 (96.8)	33.0 (91.4)	34.5 (94.1)	30.5 (86.9)	31.5 (88.7)	29.5 (85.1)	29.0 (84.2)	37.5 (99.5)
Mean daily maximum °C (°F)	19.6 (67.3)	21.1 (70.0)	24.0 (75.2)	26.4 (79.5)	28.2 (82.8)	27.3 (81.1)	25.1 (77.2)	24.7 (76.5)	23.7 (74.7)	23.4 (74.1)	22.1 (71.8)	19.9 (67.8)	23.8 (74.8)
Daily mean °C (°F)	10.4 (50.7)	11.7 (53.1)	14.4 (57.9)	16.8 (62.2)	19.2 (66.6)	19.8 (67.6)	18.6 (65.5)	18.3 (64.9)	17.4 (63.3)	15.6 (60.1)	13.1 (55.6)	11.0 (51.8)	15.5 (59.9)
Mean daily minimum °C (°F)	1.3 (34.3)	2.4 (36.3)	4.9 (40.8)	7.2 (45.0)	10.2 (50.4)	12.3 (54.1)	12.1 (53.8)	11.9 (53.4)	11.0 (51.8)	7.8 (46.0)	4.0 (39.2)	2.1 (35.8)	7.3 (45.1)
Record low °C (°F)	−11.0 (12.2)	−8.5 (16.7)	−7.5 (18.5)	−6.0 (21.2)	2.0 (35.6)	4.0 (39.2)	6.0 (42.8)	7.0 (44.6)	0.5 (32.9)	−2.5 (27.5)	−6.5 (20.3)	−11.0 (12.2)	−11.0 (12.2)
Average precipitation mm (inches)	15.2 (0.60)	9.6 (0.38)	4.3 (0.17)	8.3 (0.33)	15.9 (0.63)	65.1 (2.56)	92.6 (3.65)	90.8 (3.57)	69.3 (2.73)	34.1 (1.34)	11.2 (0.44)	11.7 (0.46)	428.1 (16.85)
Average precipitation days (≥ 0.1 mm)	2.4	1.4	0.8	1.5	3.4	8.0	10.5	10.4	9.1	5.3	1.6	2.6	57.0
Source: Servicio Meteorologico Nacional

== General information ==
Calera is one of the fastest-growing cities in Zacatecas Mx., with more than 38,189 people. It is the only municipality in Zacatecas that has an International Airport, Freeway and Railroad. Calera is the most important industrial area in Zacatecas, making floors. wood furniture, juice, purified water, dry chili processing and seeds. Calera is also home to Corona, the largest brewer in Latin America. 97% of Calera's population is Roman Catholic and 3% is Protestant.

Calera was decreed as a municipality by the recommendation of Benito Juárez; he went through these lands when he was fighting for the Republic. It was in Calera that Pancho Villa slept and planned the taking of Zacatecas (Toma de Zacatecas).

== Population ==
In the 2005 census, Apulco reported a population of 36,106. Of these, 29,626 lived in the municipal seat and the remainder lived in surrounding rural communities.
