= Constitution of Apatzingán =

1814–1815 constitution of Mexico

Constitutional Decree for the Liberty of Mexican America
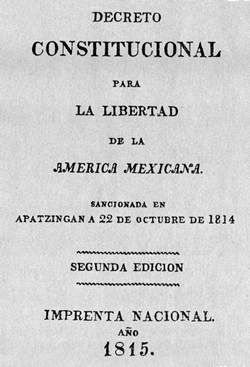
- Original cover of the Constitution of Apatzingán
- Created: 1814
- Ratified: 22 October 1814
- Location: General Archive of the Nation in the Lecumberri Palace
- Author: Congress of Anáhuac
- Signatories: Congress of Anáhuac
- Purpose: Constitution to control the independent territories

The Constitution of Apatzingán (Spanish: Constitución de Apatzingán), formally the Constitutional Decree for the Liberty of Mexican America (Spanish: Decreto Constitucional para la Libertad de la América Mexicana), was promulgated on 22 October 1814 by the Congress of Anáhuac gathered in the city of Apatzingán because of the persecution of the troops of Félix María Calleja. The constitution was valid for insurgent forces in the territories that it controlled during the Mexican War of Independence.

== Background ==
After the death of the Roman Catholic priest and revolutionary leader, Miguel Hidalgo y Costilla, on 28 June 1813, José María Morelos from Acapulco made a call to create a Congress in September in the city of Chilpancingo (now in the state of Guerrero), whose purpose was to create an independent government. Proclaimed as the Supreme National Congress, it was convened on 14 September 1813; that same day Morelos announced to the Assembly a program called Sentimientos de la Nación, in which the independence of Mexican America was declared and a government of popular representation with division of powers, prohibition of slavery and absence of castes was instituted. On 6 November, same year, the Congress signed the first official document of independence, known as the Solemn Act of the Declaration of Independence of Northern America.

== Content ==
The Constitution of Apatzingán comprised 2 titles and 242 articles. It was based on the same principles as the Constitution of Cádiz but in a modified form: as opposed to the Spanish constitution, it provided for the establishment of a republican system of government. The most relevant articles were:

1. The Catholic, apostolic and Roman religion, is the only to be professed by the State
2. The power to make laws and establish the form of government that best serves the interests of society, is the sovereignty.
5. Therefore, the sovereignty resides originally in the people, and its exercise in the national representation composed of deputies elected by the citizens in the form prescribed by the constitution.
12. These three powers, legislative, executive and judicial, must not be exercised not by one person, or by a single corporation.
13. Are deemed citizens of this America all born here.
19. The law must be equal for all...
30. Every citizen is deemed innocent until declared guilty.
42. (The provinces of the Mexican America): Mexico, Puebla, Tlaxcala, Veracruz, Yucatán, Oaxaca, Técpan, Michoacán, Querétaro, Guadalajara, Guanajuato, Potosí, Zacatecas, Durango, Sonora, Coahuila and Nuevo Reino de León.

The Supreme Government (Executive) was composed of three persons with equal authority and responsibility; same as the government would exercise as an alternative every four months. Their most direct authority, in addition to the executive and administrative nature, were to ensure the protection of the rights of citizens: liberty, property, equality and security. The Supreme Government would be exercised by José María Cos, José María Liceaga and José María Morelos.

The Constitution of Apatzingán never really entered into force. Almost a year after it was enacted, José María Morelos y Pavón was imprisoned and was shot on 22 December 1815. So royalist troops temporarily returned to take control of most of the country, but ultimately could not prevent independence of Mexican America from being consummated, first as the Mexican Empire and later as the United Mexican States.

== See also ==
- Congress of Chilpancingo
- Solemn Act of the Declaration of Independence of Northern America
- Constitutions of Mexico
- Federal Constitution of the United Mexican States of 1824
- Federal Constitution of the United Mexican States of 1857
- Political Constitution of the United Mexican States of 1917 (currently in force)
- Mexican War of Independence
- Jose Maria Morelos
- Miguel Hidalgo y Costilla
- History of democracy in Mexico
