= Rafaela López Aguado de Rayón =

Mexican heroine

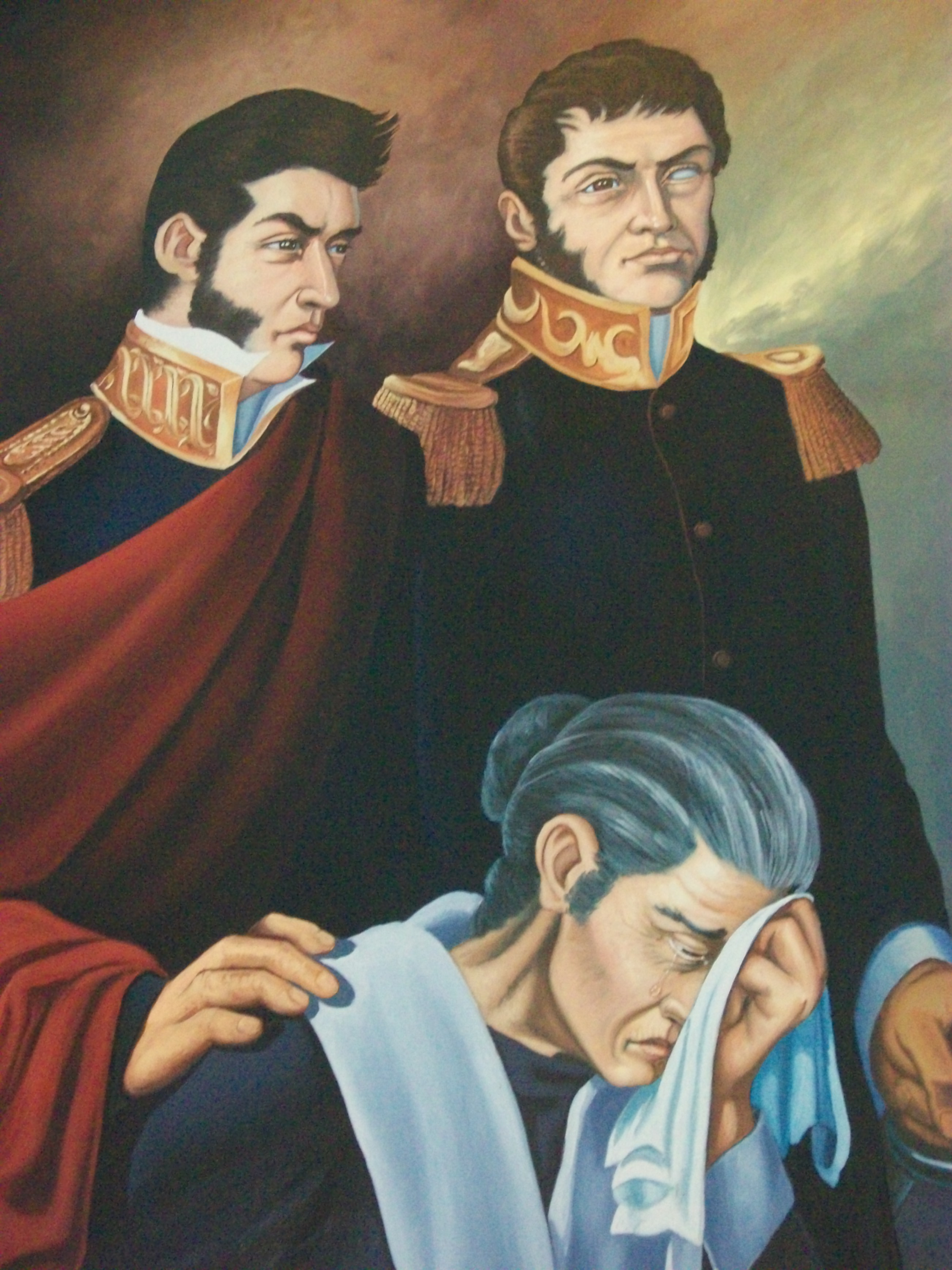
- Rafaela López Aguado de Rayón with her sons Ramon and Ignacio. Painting by Miguel G. Hernández
- Born: María Josefa Rafaela López Aguado; 1754; Province of Michoacan, New Spain
- Died: 1822 (aged 67–68)
- Known for: Support for the Mexican Independence
- Children: Ignacio López Rayón; Ramón López Rayón; José María López Rayón; Rafael López Rayón and Francisco López Rayón

Rafaela López Aguado de Rayón (1754–1822) was a Mexican woman, the mother of the five López Rayón brothers who participated in the Independence War of Mexico, one of which was general Ignacio López Rayón, minister of Miguel Hidalgo. Once her son was captured and sentenced to death, she was offered his life in exchange for her to convince her other sons to lay down their arms. She declined, saying "I prefer a dead son over becoming a traitor to the Homeland."

== Biography ==
Rafaela López Aguado de Rayón was born in 1754 in Michoacán. She descends from an old family, the ancestry of which had roots in Spain. The first settlers of her family in New Spain settled in Michoacán. She moved to Tlalpujahua where she met and married Andrés López Rayón, the father of her sons.

With Andrés López Rayón she had five sons, all of which took part in the Mexican War of Independence. One of them - Ignacio López Rayón had major impact in the liberation as a general. Her impact was to conserve her sons' ideals to join the resistance and join the fight in favor of Mexican liberation. Her older son - Ignacio López Rayón joined the war first in 1810. The others - Ramón, Rafael, José María, and Francisco joined later.

== Capture of Ignacio López Rayón ==
In December 1815, her younger son Francisco López Rayón was captured and sentenced to death. Rafaela López Aguado de Rayón was offered a treaty. If she convinced her other four sons to give up their arms, her son was going to be pardoned. She refused with the words "I prefer a dead son over becoming a traitor to the Homeland."
