= Battle of El Maguey =

- Part of the Mexican War of Independence
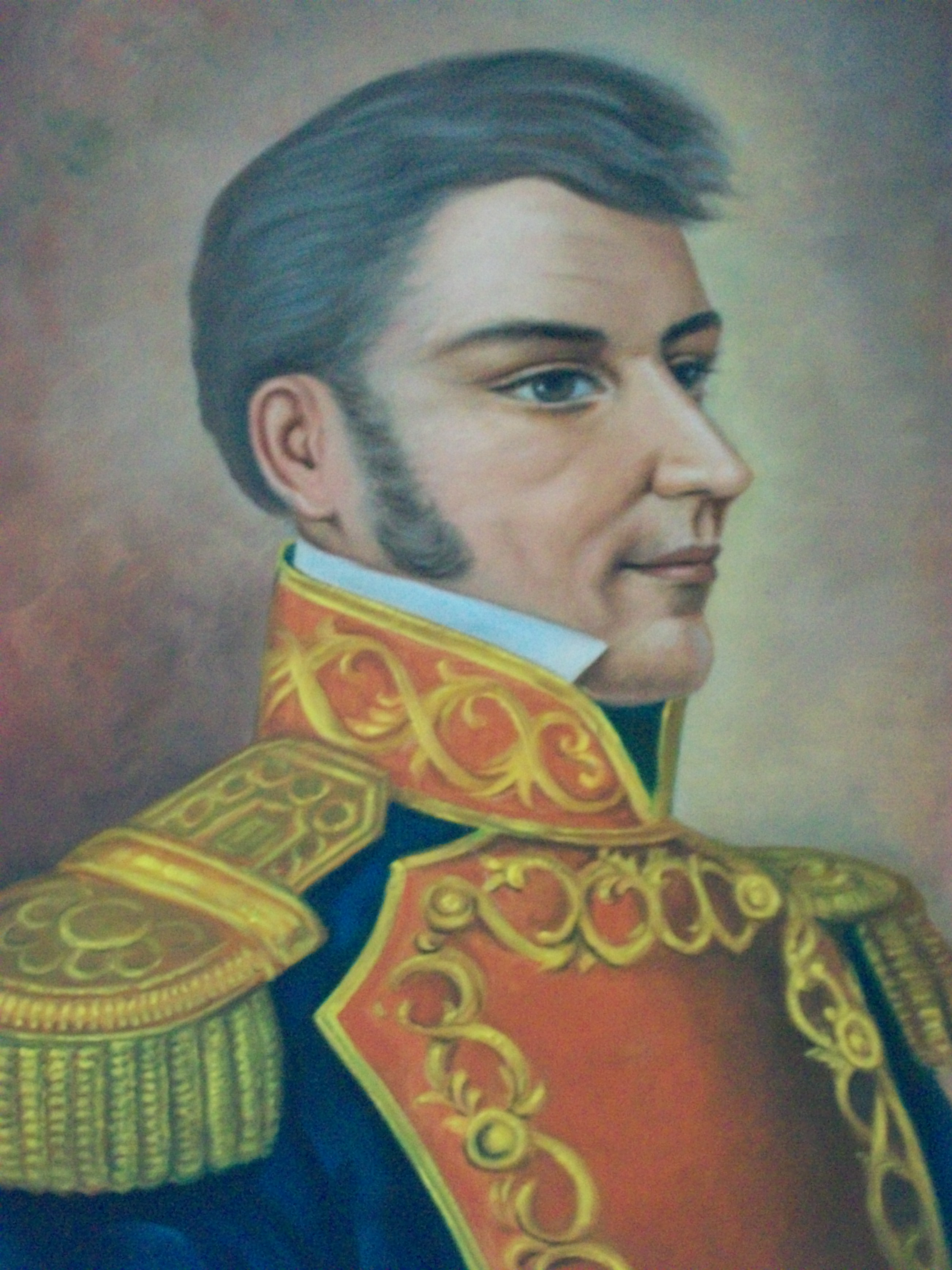
- A portrait of Ignacio López Rayón who commanded the retreating Mexican insurgents at El Maguey.
Date	2 May 1811
Location	El Maguey, Aguascalientes, Mexico
Result	Spanish royalist victory

Belligerents
Mexican Rebels	Spanish Empire

Commanders and leaders
Ignacio López Rayón	Miguel Emparan; Pedro García Conde; Count of Rule

Strength
14 cannon	~3,000 soldiers

The Battle of El Maguey was a battle of the War of Mexican Independence that occurred on 2 May 1811 at El Maguey, in the State of Aguascalientes. The battle was fought between the royalist forces loyal to the Spanish crown, commanded by General Miguel Emparan, and the Mexican rebels fighting for independence from the Spanish Empire, commanded by Ignacio López Rayón. The battle resulted in a victory for the Spanish royalists.

== The battle ==
In early May 1811, the Spanish Brigadier General, Miguel Emparan, at the head of 3,000 men with the colonels Pedro García Conde and the Count of House Rule as his second in command, pursued the army of Ignacio López Rayón through the state of Aguascalientes. The Spanish caught up with the Mexican rebels in the area around the ranch of El Maguey on 3 May.

Rayón sent his infantry, baggage, and supplies to the town of La Piedad de Cavadas, but remained in his position at El Maguey with 14 pieces of artillery and a cavalry picket to fight a rearguard action against the overwhelming advancing Spanish forces. The stand was meant to give his infantry time to escape their pursuers so they could make an organized retreat from the Spanish. General Emparan gave battle and the two armies maneuvered for position around the ranch.

Although the rebels held a ridgeline the royalists were able to make good use of their artillery, particularly targeting Rayón's artillery ammunition wagons. The rebel artillery was captured as were 100 of the rebels (of whom five were executed and the remainder released). A quantity of rebel ammunition was also captured but found to be of low quality which possibly explains the low number of royalist casualties: four men wounded.

Rayón took advantage of the confusion caused by the smoke and dust in the air and fled the action whilst Emparan continued his advance. In the end, the royalists were able to successfully take possession of all the rebel cannon left behind on the battlefield.
