= Víctor Rosales =

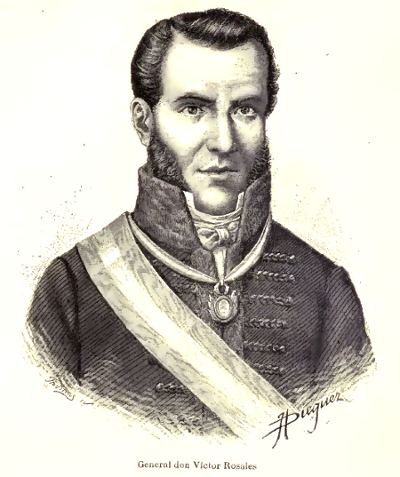
- Born: 1776; Zacatecas, Mexico
- Died: 20 May 1817 (aged 41); Ario, Michoacán
- Burial place: Monumento a la Independencia, Mexico
- Military career
- Allegiance: Mexico
- Branch: Mexican Revolutionary Army
- Rank: Field marshal
- Conflicts: Mexican War of Independence: Battle of Zacatecas (1811)
- Awards: Deserving Citizen in Heroic Degree by the Congress of the Union

Víctor Rosales (1776 – 20 May 1817) was a Mexican military officer born in Zacatecas, in the central Viceroyalty of New Spain. Rosales was a field marshal in the Mexican War of Independence.

In the Mexican War of Independence, Rosales served as commander in the Mexican Revolutionary Army under Ignacio López Rayón. He served with distinction in the Battle of Zacatecas. In 1817 Rosales was named commander-in-chief of the Mexican Revolutionary Army in Michoacán. He was killed in action on 20 May 1817, during the Battle of Ario, Michoacán against the Spanish royalists. For his actions he was posthumously awarded as Deserving Citizen in Heroic Degree by the Mexican Congress. His name is displayed in golden letters at the Honour Wall of the Palacio Legislativo de San Lázaro in Mexico City, Mexico.

Víctor Rosales is buried in a mausoleum at the base of the Monument to the Independence in Mexico, next to the remains of the other thirteen founding fathers of Mexico.
