= Battle of Zitácuaro =

1812 battle in the Mexican War of Independence

- Part of the Mexican War of Independence
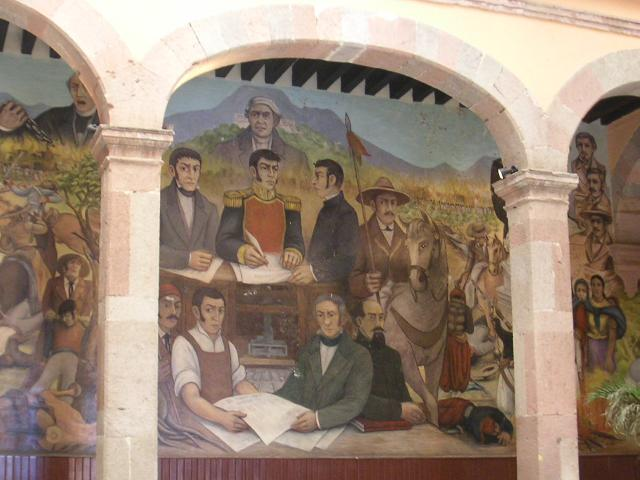
- The banner of Miguel Hidalgo, carried by the rebel forces even after his execution
Date	2 January 1812
Location	Heroica Zitácuaro, Michoacán de Ocampo, Mexico
Result	Spanish Royalist victory

Belligerents
Mexican Rebels	Spanish Empire

Commanders and leaders
Ignacio López Rayón; Ramón López Rayón	Félix María Calleja

Strength
22,000 soldiers	6,000 soldiers

Casualties and losses
300 dead	Unknown

The Battle of Zitácuaro took place during the War of Mexican Independence on 2 January 1812 in the area around Zitácuaro, Michoacán. The battle was fought between the royalist forces loyal to the Spanish crown and the Mexican rebels fighting for independence from the Spanish Empire. The Mexican insurgents were commanded by General Ignacio López Rayón and the Spanish by Félix María Calleja. The battle resulted in a victory for the Spanish Royalists even in the face of overwhelming odds.

== Context ==
The viceroy of New Spain, Francisco Javier Venegas, ordered the retaking of the city of Heroica Zitácuaro as it was the contemporary site of the Zitacuaro Council, the headquarters for the direction of the entire insurgency against the Spanish crown.

== The battle ==
The two armies came to blows in and around the city of Zitácuaro. During the battle, Ramón López Rayón, the younger brother of the supreme insurgent commander, Ignacio López Rayón, lost his eye. After many hours of battle, the city eventually fell to Spanish forces despite the numerical superiority of the rebel forces.

== Aftermath ==
In the wake of the rebel defeat at Zitácuaro, the members of the Zitacuaro Council were made to flee the city and relocated to the towns of Tlalchapa and Sultepec.

== See also ==
- 1808 political crisis of Mexico
- Mexican War of Independence
- Timeline of Mexican War of Independence
