= Battle of Tenango del Valle =

- Part of the Mexican War of Independence
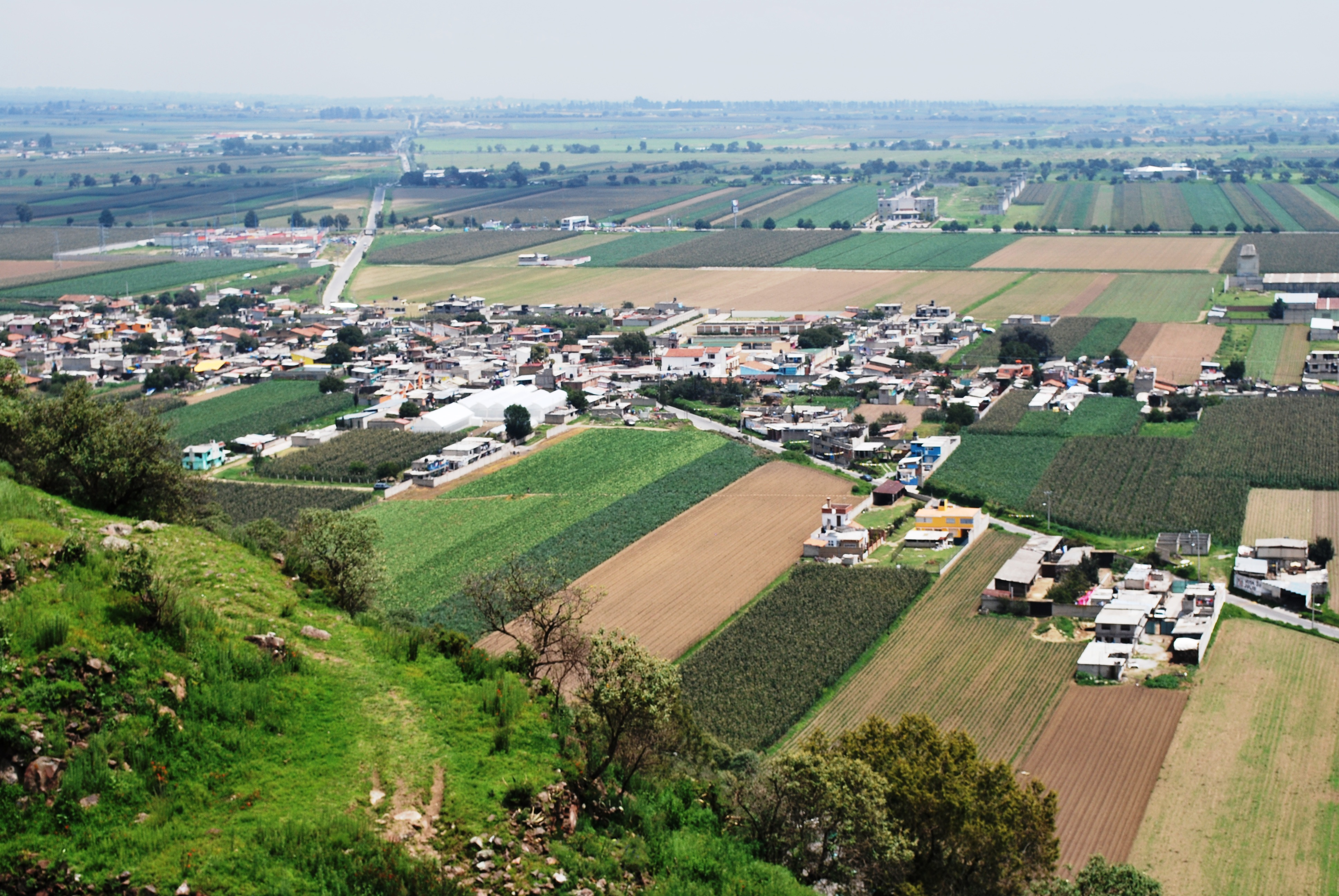
- An areal view of Tenango del Valle where the battle occurred.
Date	May, 1812
Location	Tenango del Valle, State of Mexico, Mexico
Result	Mexican rebel victory

Belligerents
Mexican Rebels	Spanish Empire

Commanders and leaders
Ignacio López Rayón	Unknown

The Battle of Tenango del Valle took place during the War of Mexican Independence in May 1812 on the outskirts of Tenango del Valle, State of Mexico. The battle was fought between the royalist forces loyal to the Spanish crown, and the Mexican rebels fighting for independence from the Spanish Empire.

The forces of the Mexican insurgents under the command of Ignacio López Rayón were able to successfully rout the forces loyal to the Spanish crown.

== See also ==
- Mexican War of Independence
