= José María Liceaga =

Mexican soldier and politician (1780–1818)

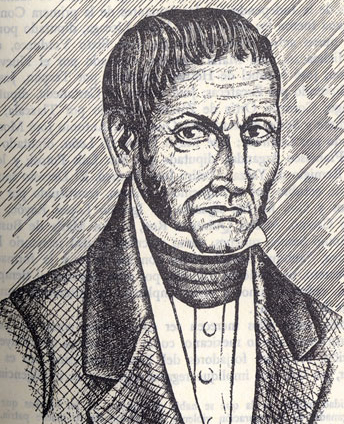
- Portrait of Liceaga

Member of the Zitacuaro Council

Member of the Congress of Anáhuac

Personal details
- Born: February 26, 1780 Romita, Guanajuato, Viceroyalty of New Spain
- Died: January 2, 1818 (aged 37) Romita, Guanajuato, Viceroyalty of New Spain
- Cause of death: Assassination
- Parents: Manuel de Liceaga; María Josefa Reyna
- Education: Colegio de la Purísima Concepción
- Profession: Hacendado, Insurgent Fighter, Politician
- Military career
- Allegiance: Mexican Insurgency
- Branch: Insurgent Army
- Service years: 1810–1817
- Rank: Lieutenant colonel
- Battles/wars: Mexican War of Independence; Battle of Monte de las Cruces; Battle of Aculco; Battle of Calderón Bridge; Capture of Valladolid

José María Liceaga (February 26, 1780 – January 2, 1818) was a soldier, medical doctor and landowner from New Spain who was a key figure in the Mexican War of Independence.

Born in 1780 in Romita, Guanajuato, he saw rising tensions between Mexico and Spain. He was the representative of the province of Guadalajara, and was one of the signatories of the Solemn Act of the Declaration of Independence of Northern America and the Constitutional Decree for the Freedom of Mexican America. He was also one of the signatories of the Declaration of Independence for Mexico. In 1818, he was assassinated over a loan that he had failed to repay.

== Early life ==
Liceaga was born on February 26, 1780 in Romita, Guanajuato. He was the son of Manuel de Liceaga and María Josefa Reyna. He studied medicine in hopes of becoming a doctor. After finishing his studies, he decided to join the army.

== Military career ==
In 1810, after the outbreak of the Mexican War of Independence, he joined Miguel Hidalgo and was appointed lieutenant colonel. On October 30, 1810, he took part in a battle at Monte de las Cruces, known as the Battle of Calderón Bridge. Hidalgo's troops confronted and defeated the royalist soldiers. After Hidalgo's execution, Liceaga took command and continued through northwestern Mexico. In 1817, he retired from the military.

== Political career ==
Liceaga was appointed a member of the Zitacuaro Council. In 1813, he served as the representative of Guadalajara in the Congress of Chilpancingo.

== Assassination ==
On January 2, 1818, Liceaga was assassinated by Captain Juan Ríos, who at the time was under the command of insurgent commander Miguel Borja. Historians later determined that the assassination was motivated by a loan of 1,000 pesos that Ríos had made to Liceaga and that Liceaga had failed to repay.

== Legacy ==
A statue in his honor was built in Romita at the initiative of the mayor.
