= Calderón River =

Coordinates: 20.6752°N 103.0108°W

The Calderón River is a tributary of the Lerma Santiago River that flows westward from the Altos region of Jalisco to its junction with the Lerma Santiago River in Tonalá.

The River contains a number of dams, including the Elías González Chávez Dam built in 1991 located in the municipality of Acatic and La Red Dam built in 1967 in the municipality of Tepatitlán de Morelos.

One of the oldest bridges over the river in the municipality of Zapotlanejo, the Calderón Bridge, was the site of a decisive battle in the Mexican War of Independence.
