= Constitutional Elements (Mexico) =

Draft constitution for Mexico, 1812

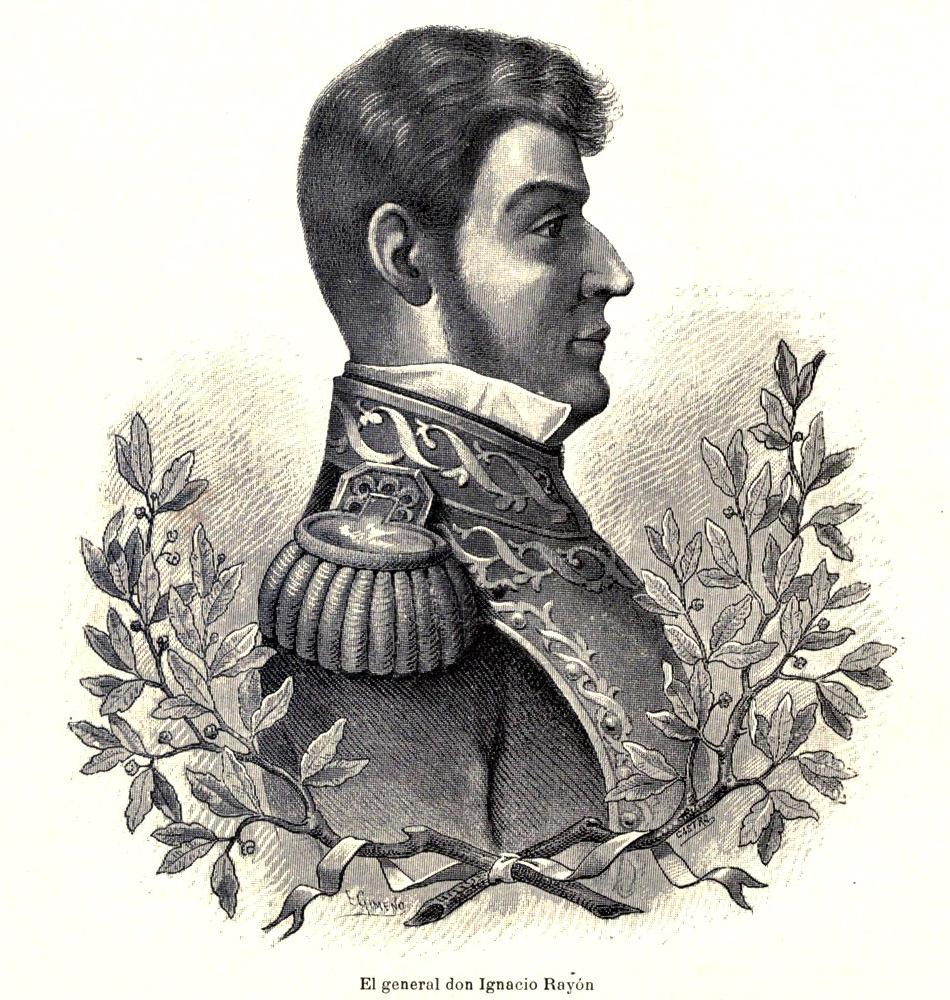
Ignacio López Rayón, creator of the Constitutional Elements.

The Constitutional Elements (Spanish: Elementos Constitucionales) were a set of guidelines in the form of a draft constitution for Mexico (then still the Viceroyalty of New Spain), written in April 1812, during the Mexican War of Independence by General Ignacio López Rayón, and circulated on September 4, 1812, in Zinacantepec, State of Mexico, with the purpose of constituting a nation independent from Spain. They are considered the direct antecedent and source of creation of the Sentimientos de la Nación of José María Morelos and, therefore, of the subsequent Constitution of 1824. Therefore, it is the oldest antecedent of Mexican constitutionalism.

== History ==
Once the struggle for independence began, and given the power vacuum left by Ferdinand VII when he was deposed by Napoleon Bonaparte in 1808, it was in the interest of the insurgents to try to base their struggle for independence from the Viceroyalty of New Spain on legal principles that would legitimize their actions and serve as a basis for uniting the people around common ideals.

In this sense, and following the revolutionary experiences of France and the United States, as well as the constitution drawn up by the latter country in 1787, the insurgents were driven to draw up a document containing the basic rights and principles of a new State and to establish authority even in the absence of the monarch. However, this was not a sentiment particular to the American continent, as evidenced by the constitutional movement in Spain that culminated in the Cadiz Constitution of 1812.

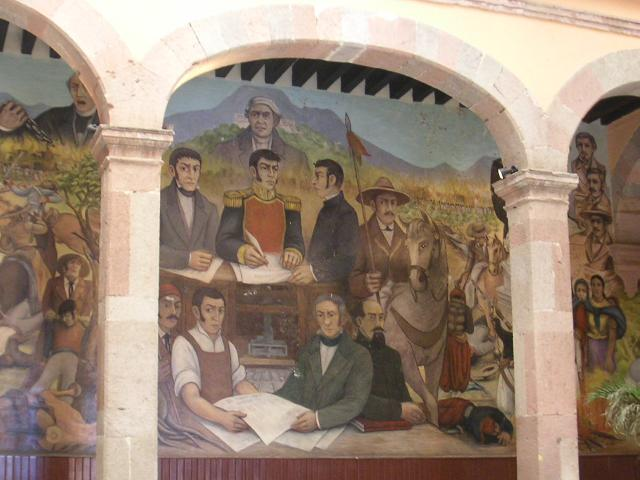
The Junta de Zitácuaro in whose context the Constitutional Elements were written. Mural in Zitácuaro, Michoacán.

In the context of the Independence, and since the viceroyalty authorities of New Spain were not recognized in the absence of Ferdinand VII, on August 19, 1811, the Supreme National American Meeting, known as the Junta de Zitácuaro, was established in the town of the same name in Michoacán, as the governing body for what would soon become the Mexican nation, made up of the main leaders of the insurgency at that time, among them José María Morelos and Ignacio López Rayón. Both would be appointed members of the Junta and, the latter, as Universal Minister of the Nation. The Junta would later move to Sultepec, currently in the State of Mexico.

López Rayón set about the task of writing a draft constitution, to be considered for later approval by the Junta, which he titled Elementos Constitucionales (Constitutional Elements). The exact date of their drafting is unknown, however, from the missive sent to Morelos, it is established that they were created on April 30, 1812, and by the summer of that same year they were in circulation. Apparently, the document was signed in Zinacantepec.

Rayón sent a first draft of the Elements to Morelos — who was in Puebla — on April 30, 1812. However, the reply did not arrive until November 7 of the same year, apparently due to a delay Morelos claimed. In this letter Morelos points out a series of corrections to the Elements in which he proposes to exclude all reference to the authority of Ferdinand VII:

[...]as regards the sovereignty of Ferdinand VII, as the fate that has befallen this great man is so public and notorious, it is necessary to exclude him to give the public the Constitution.

— Letter from Morelos to Rayón, November 7, 1812.

Before receiving the Elements, Morelos had pronounced his position regarding Ferdinand VII, in a letter sent to Rayón in previous days:

This is my opinion, salvo meliori, and that the mask be removed from Independence, because everyone knows the fate of our Ferdinand VII.

— Letter from Morelos to Rayón, November 2, 1812.

He also proposed that instead of a single National Protector, as Rayón proposed, there should be one for each bishopric to be elected every four years, and other observations on the distribution and organization of the militia.

These corrections did not amend the text, but were added as a colophon, at the foot of the document, indicating Morelos's authorship.

The content of the Constitutional Elements — which transcended to other later texts due to the knowledge that Morelos had of them — could have had repercussions in the final draft of the Sentimientos de la Nación of 1813, to later be included in the Constitution of Apatzingán of 1814, in which Rayón would also participate and which contains many parallels with the rights pointed out in the Elements.

== Contents ==
The document consists of a preamble which exalts the legitimacy and justice of the "Independence of America" and outlines that the deposit of sovereignty resides in the people:

We, therefore, have the unspeakable satisfaction and the high honor of having merited the free peoples of our country to compose the Supreme Court of the Nation and to represent the Majesty that resides only in them.

— Constitutional Elements circulated by Ignacio Rayón.

The body of the Constitutional Elements is made up of 38 statements in the form of articles, and contains the main ideas for the creation of an independent state proclaimed by the insurgency:

- The Catholic religion as the official and only religion (Articles 1, 2 and 3).
- Independence of America (Article 4).
- Sovereignty emanates from the people but presides in the figure of the monarch Ferdinand VII (Article 5).
- The exercise of sovereignty must tend towards the independence and happiness of the nation (Article 6).
- The exercise of sovereignty resides in a Supreme National Congress (Articles 5, 7 to 16).
- Appointment of a "National Protector" as Executive Power (Article 17).
- Existence of three powers: Executive, Legislature and Judiciary (Article 21).
- Proscription of slavery and castes (Articles 24 and 25).
- Civil rights (Articles 29 to 32).
- September 16 as a national holiday (Article 33).
- Military organization (Articles 33 to 38).

The draft ends with a reflection on the past of the American people "forgotten by some, pitied by others and despised by the majority" and on its more hopeful future, with full equality and equity among men, where "cowardice and idleness will be the only thing that infames the citizen", and also with a religious exhortation: "bless the God of destinies who has deigned to look with compassion on his people".

In a later draft this final reflection appears as a harangue, followed by the corrections made by Morelos.

== Ideology ==
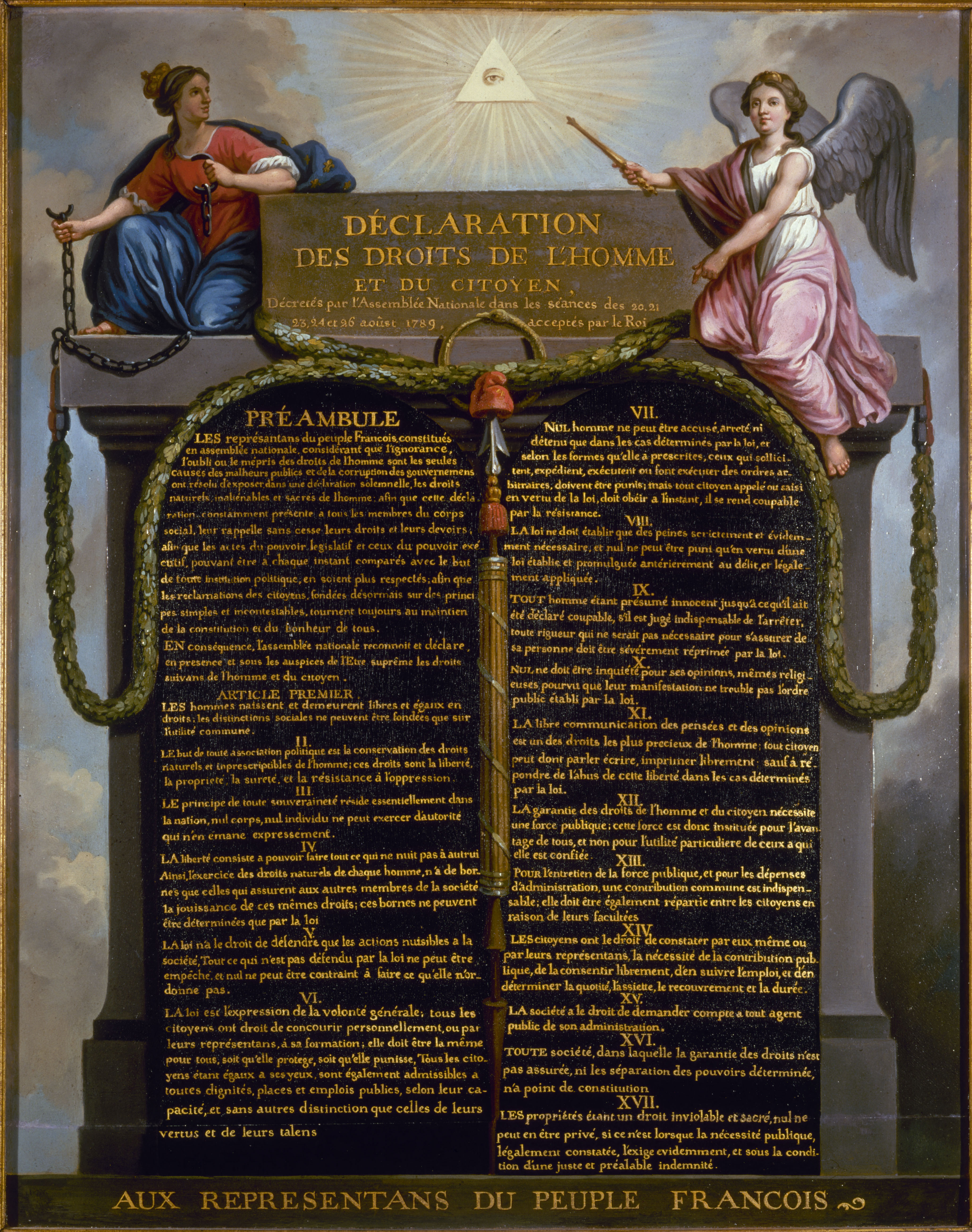
The "Declaration of the Rights of Man and of the Citizen", adopted by the French National Constituent Assembly in 1789, which influenced the contents of the Constitutional Elements, mainly in relation to civil rights.

Within the Constitutional Elements, the philosophical and cultural background of Novo-Hispanic liberalism is noteworthy, from classic European representatives such as Locke, Hobbes, Montesquieu, Voltaire, Rousseau, Suárez and Vitoria, to thinkers from the American continent such as Francisco Javier Clavijero, Fray Servando Teresa de Mier and Francisco Javier Alegre, among others. The works of both authors circulated in the Viceroyalty of New Spain during the 18th century. Likewise, there is no doubt that the influence of French Revolutionary and American constitutionalist ideas had a profound effect on the Novo-Hispanic sentiment.

In America, during the independence period, some specific political ideas were distinguished as guidelines:

1. Enlightened absolutism.
2. Constitutionalism, with the recognition of individual rights.
3. Democracy.
4. Jeremy Bentham's utilitarianism.

These contents can be found in the Constitutional Elements inherited from Rayón's pen, coming from his legal training. However, it is very likely that its basic contents can be attributed to Miguel Hidalgo y Costilla himself, whose lieutenant and secretary he was. At least this is evident in the reference Morelos makes to it in the letter in which he acknowledges receipt of the first draft of the Elements, dated November 7, 1812:

Until now I had not received the Constitutional Elements: I have seen them and, with little difference, they are the same as the ones we discussed with Mr. Hidalgo.

Among the ideas held by the Elements, it is worth mentioning the loyalty to the figure of Ferdinand VII held by Rayón in Article 5, which earned him some ideological differences with Morelos who held the absolute emancipation of America. But at the same time he affirmed the ideas of Rousseau on the sovereignty of the people, which would later be taken up by the Constitution of Apatzingán and has remained until the current Constitution of 1917, which in its Article 39 states:

National sovereignty resides essentially and originally in the people. All public power emanates from the people and is instituted for their benefit. The people have at all times the inalienable right to alter or modify the form of their government.

— Political Constitution of the United Mexican States of 1917

Nevertheless, Rayón upheld the democratic idea that the exercise of power concerns a congress, in this case the Supreme American National Congress.

Likewise, in its article 31, the Constitutional Elements offers, speaking of the inviolability of the home, the guarantees of «the celebrated Corpus huves Act of England», referring to the Habeas Corpus Act 1640, which contained the protection of individual liberty from non-jurisdictional detention, including the Crown, when such detention did not originate from a judicial authority. This reveals Rayón's knowledge of English law, and places the Constitutional Elements, according to Soberanes Fernández, as the earliest antecedent of the Mexican amparo trial.

A certain religious intolerance is also present (Articles 1 and 2), since it exalts Catholicism as the State religion. This outlawed freedom of creeds, which would find a place in the Mexican constitutional ideology until the Constitution of 1857.

Likewise, the liberty and equality of all citizens was a main concept of French liberalism. The first was realized by pointing out the proscription of slavery (art. 24); the second was expressed in the Elements in attention to the elimination of lineages, in its article 25.

Whoever was born after the happy independence of our Nation, will only be hindered by personal defects, without the class of his lineage being able to oppose him. [...]

Lastly, the freedom of the press established in Article 29, which would constitute the antecedent for the freedom of expression, thought and press that would later be granted in Article 40 of the Constitution of Apatzingán.

== See also ==
- List of constitutions of Mexico
- Constitution of Mexico
- Natural law
- Liberalism
- New Spain
