= Ignacio López Rayón =

Mexican revolutionary (1773–1832)

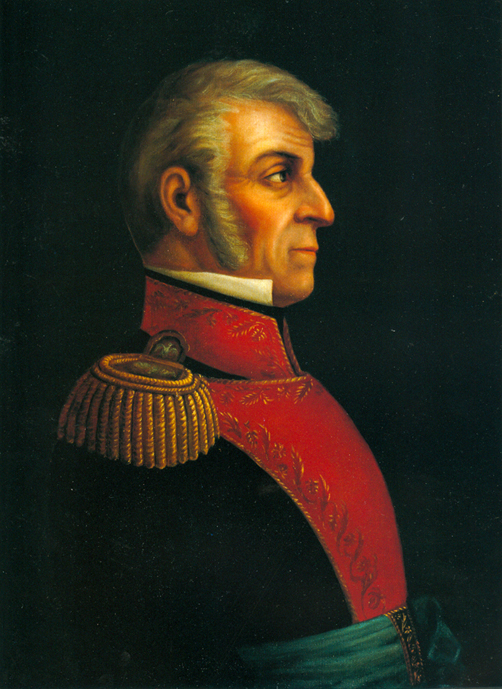
- Ignacio López Rayón

Congress of Chilpancingo Deputy of Nueva Galicia
- In office September 13, 1813 – December 15, 1815

Universal Minister of the Nation and President of the Supreme Council of the Zitacuaro Council
- In office August 21, 1811 – September 13, 1813
- Preceded by: Post established
- Succeeded by: Post abandoned upon creation of the Congress of Chilpancingo

Personal details
- Born: José Ignacio Antonio López-Rayón y López-Aguado; 31 July 1773 Tlalpujahua, Intendancy of Valladolid, Viceroyalty of New Spain (now Michoacán, Mexico)
- Died: 2 February 1832 (aged 58) Mexico City, First Mexican Republic
- Profession: Lawyer

Military service
- Allegiance: Mexico
- Branch/service: Mexican Insurgency
- Years of service: 1810–1813
- Rank: General
- Battles/wars: Mexican War of Independence: Battle of Puerto de Piñones; Battle of Zacatecas; Battle of El Maguey; Battle of Zitacuaro; Battle of Tenango del Valle; Battle of Cerro de Cóporo

Ignacio López Rayón (July 31, 1773 – February 2, 1832) was a general who led the insurgent forces of his country after Miguel Hidalgo's death, during the first years of the Mexican War of Independence. He subsequently established the first government, Zitacuaro Council, and first constitution of the proposed independent nation, called Constitutional Elements.

== First years ==
López Rayón was born in Tlalpujahua, Intendancy of Valladolid, the first son of Andrés Mariano López-Rayón Piña (1742–1805) and María Josefa Rafaela López-Aguado y López-Bolaños (1754–1822). He went to the Colegio de San Nicolás in Valladolid (today's Morelia) and in Mexico City's Colegio de San Ildefonso where he became a lawyer in 1796. He lived in Mexico City but when his father got sick he had to go back to Morelia to take control of the family business (agriculture and mining) and the post office in the town. In August 1810 he married María Ana Martínez de Rulfo.

== Mexican War of Independence ==
During the first months of the Mexican War of Independence he got in contact with Antonio Fernández, an independence soldier. Rayón sent him a letter with the idea of creating a group of people to represent the power of Fernando VII to try to stop the waste of resources. Miguel Hidalgo was in agreement with the idea. The Spanish tried to capture Rayón but he escaped and joined Miguel Hidalgo's troops in Maravatío. Later on, he became Hidalgo's private secretary.

=== Miguel Hidalgo ===
In Guadalajara, Hidalgo named him Secretary of State, and as such, he signed the emancipation of slaves on December 6, 1810. He organized the provisional government with José María Chico as president, Pascasio Ortiz de Letona as ambassador and Francisco Severo Maldonado as chief editor of the first newspaper of the rebellion: El Despertador Americano (in English: The American Watchclock).

Miguel Hidalgo's army was defeated in the Battle of Calderon Bridge and Rayón escaped to Aguascalientes to join Rafael Iriarte. They went to Zacatecas to join the rest of the army that had escaped from the Battle of Calderon Bridge.

The army moved to Saltillo, Coahuila. The insurgents' chiefs tried to travel to the United States, while the army remained in Saltillo with Rayón as the army chief; because of this Rayón became general. In this travel Miguel Hidalgo, Ignacio Allende and the others were captured in Wells of Baján and sentenced to death.

=== Battles after Hidalgo's death ===
On March 26, 1811, Rayón moved out from Saltillo to Zacatecas. At that time his army comprised 3500 soldiers and 22 guns. The Spanish army found Rayón's army in the way of Agua Nueva, and Rayón lost 77 men (prisoners). On April 1, the battle of los Piñones began, which Rayón won after six hours. On April 13 Rayón sent Pedro María de Anaya and Víctor Rosales to scout the Zacatecas army, while he took position in the "Los Misioneros de Guadalupe college". On April 15, 1811, the battle for Zacatecas began. Patriot general José Antonio Torres (nicknamed "el Amo Torres") conquered the "Cerro del Grillo" hill where all the artillery, ammunition, food and silver was. With these actions Rayón's army won the battle. Once in Zacatecas, Rayón spent most of the time with his army, training, getting uniforms and improving his war techniques.

Rayón chose to move to Aguascalientes because a big Spanish army was coming to Zacatecas. While Rayón's army was traveling, Colonel Miguel Emparan intercepted them, but Rayón won and kept moving toward the Intendancy of Valladolid. On May 3, close to La Piedad, the Battle of El Maguey took place. Rayón lost the battle and his resources. In La Piedad he tried to get more resources and move out to Zamora. Here he organized some troops and sent them with Torres to Pátzcuaro. Torres was attacked in the Tinaja Hill. Rayón went to help him and they both won the battle against the Spanish army.

Rayón tried to attack Valladolid (today's Morelia) but because the Spanish received reinforcements he ceased the attack. He went to Tiripetío to change the course of the war. Here he distributed his forces, starting a guerrilla war. He sent Torres to Pátzcuaro and Uruapan, Navarrete to Zacapu, Mariano Caneiga to Panindícuaro and Manuel Muñiz to Tacámbaro. Rayón went to Zitacuaro to prepare the defense. Emparan left Maravatío to attack Zitacuaro on June 22. Rayón had fewer men than Emparan but better artillery. Rayón's army attracted the attackers to town. Close to the artillery range, the battle lasted the whole day. The Spanish could not take the town, with heavy losses for both armies.

=== Zitacuaro Council and the Constitutional Elements ===
Rayón conceived the idea of creating a central government to unify the independence leaders. He wrote a letter to Jose Maria Morelos y Pavon; Morelos agreed to become a member of the group and sent José Sixto Verduzco in his representation.

From August 19 to 21, Rayón, José María Liceaga, Joaquín López, José Sixto Verduzco and others created the Supreme National American Meeting. Rayón was the president. They created the first revolutionary newspaper, the El Ilustrador Nacional edited by Andrés Quintana Roo and José María Cos. Because the importance of Rayón, the Spanish sent an assassin J. Arnoldo but he failed and was killed. On January 1, 1812, Zitacuaro was attacked by general Félix María Calleja. The revolutionary army resisted a long time. Finally Calleja saw that taking the city was hard and changed his plan and left it. While Calleja was leaving the revolutionary army also left Zitacuaro. Calleja was now too far from Zitacuaro to intercept the revolutionary leaders. When Calleja knew that the city was open, he occupied it.

After the Zitacuaro events, Rayón took part with José María Morelos in the first National Congress at Chilpancingo.

Four years later, he was arrested by Nicolás Bravo and sent to prison until 1820.

== After the war ==
After the war, he became the state treasurer of San Luis Potosí.

In 1828, he ran for President but lost to Manuel Gomez Pedraza.

López Rayón died on February 2, 1832, in Mexico City.

== Bibliography ==
- Herrejón Peredo, Carlos (1985). Secretaría de Educación Pública (ed.). La Independencia según Ignacio Rayón. Cien de México. Biblioteca Digital Bicentenario (1ª ed.). México. ISBN 9682905338. Archived from the original (PDF) on January 19, 2010.
- Ansures, Rafael (1909). Oficina tipográfica del gobierno (ed.). Los héroes de la Independencia. Biblioteca Digital Bicentenario. México. Archived from the original (PDF) on December 22, 2010.
- Villaseñor y Villaseñor, Alejandro (1910). "Ignacio Rayón". In Imprenta "El Tiempo" de Victoriano Agüeros (ed.). Biografías de los héroes y caudillos de la Independencia. Biblioteca Digital Bicentenario. México. Archived from the original (PDF) on June 25, 2009.
- Villoro, Luis (2006). "La revolución de independencia". In El Colegio de México (ed.). Historia General de México (1ª ed.). México. ISBN 9681209699.
- Zárate, Julio (1880). "La Guerra de Independencia". In Riva Palacio, Vicente; Ballescá y Compañía (eds.). México a través de los siglos. Vol. III. México.

== See also ==
- History of Mexico
