= Sentimientos de la Nación =

Mexican political text, read in 1813

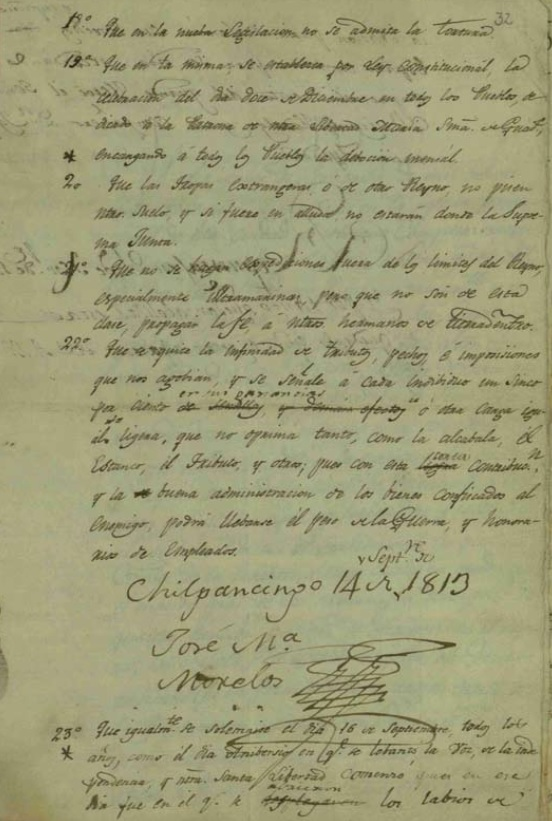
Sentimientos de la Nación, página 3

Sentimientos de la Nación ("Feelings of the Nation"; occasionally rendered as "Sentiments of the Nation") was a document presented by José María Morelos y Pavón, leader of the insurgents in the Mexican War of Independence, to the National Constituent Congress in Chilpancingo (modern-day Guerrero) on 14 September 1813.

The document set out, in 23 points, Morelos's vision of the future nation of Mexico.

1. America is free and independent of Spain and all other nations, governments, or monarchies.
2. The Catholic faith is the sole religion, and no others will be tolerated.
3. Ministers of religion to survive on tithes and first fruits, with the people owing only devotion and offerings.
4. Dogma as established by Church hierarchy: Pope, bishops, and priests.
5. Sovereignty emanates from the people and is placed in a Supreme National American Congress, made up of representatives from the provinces in equal numbers.
6. Division of powers into appropriate executive, legislative, and judicial branches.
7. Representatives to serve rotating four year terms.
8. Adequate remuneration for representatives, not exceeding 8000 pesos.
9. Jobs to be reserved for Americans only.
10. No foreigners to be admitted, unless they are artisans capable of sharing their skills and free of all suspicion.
11. Liberal government to replace tyranny, with the expulsion of the Spaniards.
12. Laws should promote patriotism and industry, moderate opulence and idleness, and improve the lot and the education of the poor.
13. Laws should apply to all, with no privileges.
14. Laws to be drafted and discussed by as many wise men as possible.
15. That prohibit slavery forever, as the distinction of caste, being all equal and only vice and virtue distinguish an American from the other.
16. Some of the nation's ports to be open to friendly foreign ships, subject to a 10% levy.
17. Homes and property to be inviolable.
18. Torture shall not be permitted.
19. 12 December to be dedicated to the Virgin of Guadalupe, and celebrated.
20. Foreign troops should not enter the country and, if they do so to render assistance, may not approach the seat of government.
21. No expeditions beyond the nation's borders to be permitted, particularly overseas expeditions; expeditions in the interior to spread the faith are allowed.
22. An end to the payment of tributes; a tax of 5% or similar light amount to be levied.
23. 16 September to be consecrated as the anniversary of Independence.

== See also ==
- Solemn Act of the Declaration of Independence of Northern America
- History of democracy in Mexico
- Constitutional Elements
