= Félix María Calleja del Rey =

Spanish military officer and colonial official during the Mexican War of Independence

The Most Excellent The Count of Calderón
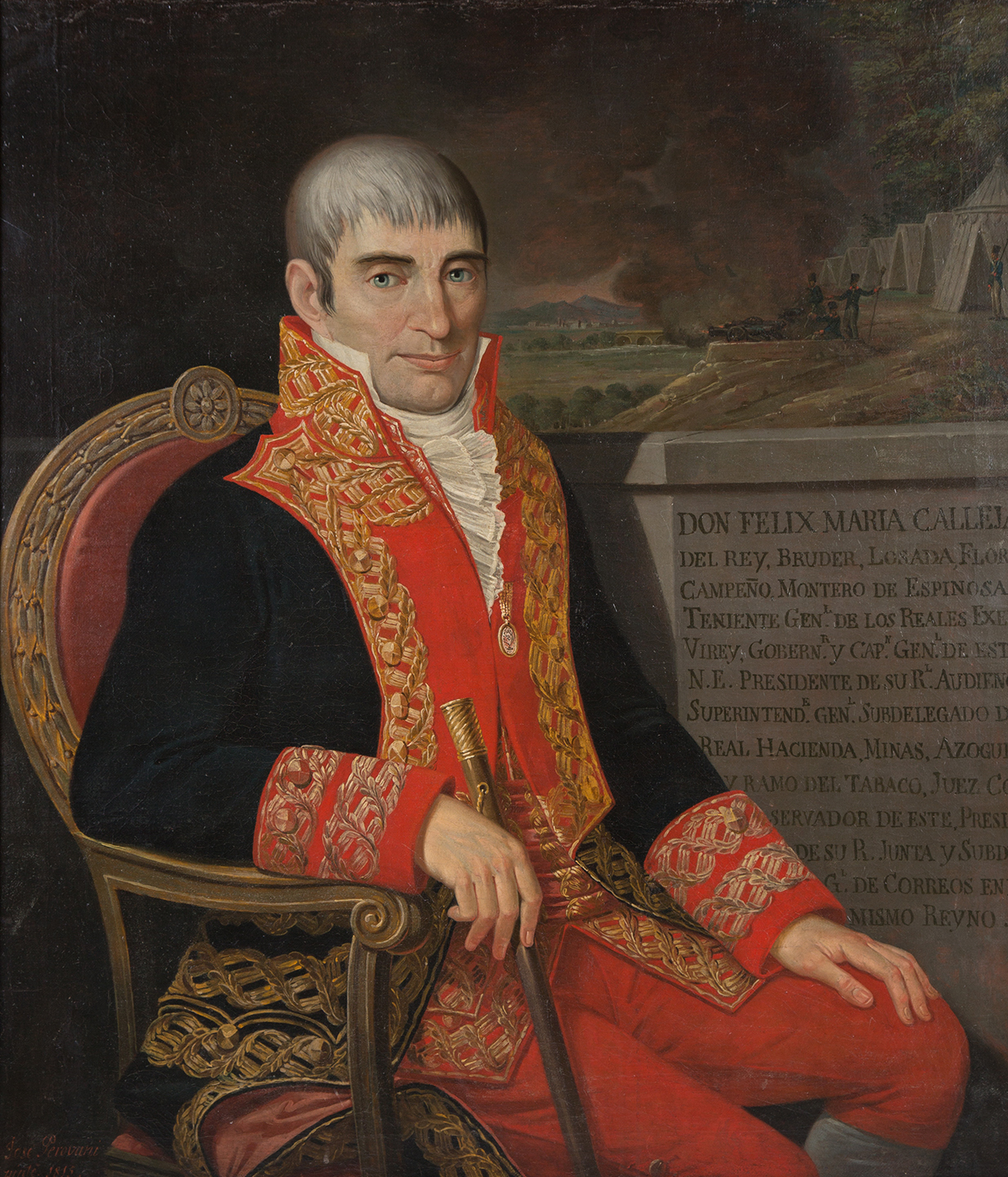

60th Viceroy of New Spain
- In office March 4, 1813 – September 20, 1816
- Monarch: Ferdinand VII of Spain
- Preceded by: Francisco Javier Venegas
- Succeeded by: Juan Ruiz de Apodaca

Personal details
- Born: Félix María Calleja del Rey Bruder Losada Campaño y Montero de Espinosa; November 1, 1753 Medina del Campo, Spain
- Died: July 24, 1828 (aged 74) Valencia, Spain
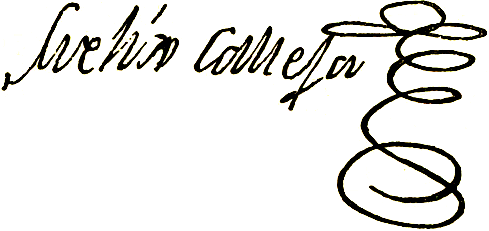
- Signature

Military service
- Allegiance: Spain
- Branch/service: Spanish Army
- Rank: General
- Commands: Army of the Center
- Battles/wars: Mexican War of Independence • Battle of Calderón Bridge

Félix María Calleja del Rey y de la Gándara, primer conde de Calderón (November 1, 1753, Medina del Campo, Spain – July 24, 1828, Valencia, Spain) was a Spanish military officer and viceroy of New Spain from March 4, 1813, to September 20, 1816, during Mexico's War of Independence. For his service in New Spain, Calleja was awarded with the title Count of Calderon.

== Before the insurrection of 1810 ==
Captain Calleja del Rey accompanied the Count of Revillagigedo to New Spain in 1789, when Revillagigedo took up the position of viceroy. Calleja became commander of an infantry brigade in the intendancy of San Luis Potosí. Under the government of Viceroy Miguel José de Azanza he fought with severity and cruelty to subdue the Indians of the area. He also fought against Anglo-American filibusters who were encroaching on the underpopulated Spanish territory of Texas. Among the officers under his command was Ignacio Allende, who was later to become a hero of Mexican independence. Calleja is famous for his finishing of the biggest insurrections in his time, the 1811 and the 1813 insurrections. He succeeded in killing the three famous leaders of these revolts, Hidalgo, Allende, and Morelos.

Calleja married Francisca de la Gándara, a very rich Criolla and owner of the hacienda of Bledos.

== General in the royalist army ==
Calleja is regarded by some historians as one of the greatest military commanders that have ever fought in Mexico, because of his astute yet sometimes barbaric methods. With the Grito de Dolores of Miguel Hidalgo on September 16, 1810, supporters of independence rose in many places in New Spain. Within a month many large cities in the central part of the country fell to the rebels — Celaya (September 21), Guanajuato (September 28), Zacatecas (October 7), Valladolid (October 17), and Guadalajara (November 11) among them.

At Monte de las Cruces, at the gates of Mexico City, 80,000 insurgents under Hidalgo and Ignacio Allende defeated the royalists on October 30, 1810. There was panic in Mexico City. However, in a moment of apparent indecision, Father Hidalgo ordered a retreat toward Valladolid. The reason for this has never been adequately explained.

After the retreat of the insurgents, Viceroy Francisco Javier Venegas ordered Calleja, now a brigadier in command of a cavalry division, to march from San Luis Potosí to the aid of the capital. On the march between Querétaro and Mexico City, Calleja met the insurgents in the plains of San Jerónimo Aculco, where he decimated them on November 7, 1810. He then retook Guanajuato on November 25 and Guadalajara on January 21, 1811.

Calleja defeated the insurgents again, decisively, in the Battle of the Bridge of Calderón on January 17, 1811. The insurgents were on the point of victory when a grenade ignited a munitions wagon in their camp, sowing confusion. The royalists took advantage, and routed the insurgents. A remnant of the rebel forces, including Hidalgo and other leaders, began retreating toward the United States. The leaders were captured by the royalists and executed.

Calleja's 4,000 troops became the basis of the royalist Army of the Center that fought Hidalgo, Ignacio López Rayón and Father José María Morelos.

Calleja retreated to Mexico City after an unsuccessful 72-day siege against Morelos in Cuautla. In his home in Mexico City he received royalists who were discontented with Viceroy Venegas's inability to suppress the insurrection. The Audiencia and other officials resolved to complain about the viceroy to Regency in Cádiz.

== Viceroy of New Spain ==
Calleja received his appointment as Venegas's replacement on January 28, 1813, but did not actually take up the post until March 4. His initial assessment of the state of affairs was not encouraging. The government coffers were empty, and the government was floating a large debt. More than two million pesos were owed to the troops. Whole units lacked adequate uniforms and boots. Armament was in a bad state and there was a shortage of horses.

With his characteristic energy, he threw himself into remedying the situation. He confiscated the property of the Inquisition, which had been abolished by the Spanish Constitution of 1812. He solicited a loan of two million pesos from the commercial sector. He farmed out the alcabala (sales tax) to improve its collection. He reorganized the public treasury and required strict accounting of the viceroyalty's income and expenses. He reestablished commerce and the postal service, which had been interrupted by the war with the insurgents. With the money he raised he formed a powerful army, well equipped, paid, armed and disciplined.

In late 1813 an epidemic of fever killed tens of thousands of people. Morelos captured Acapulco on April 20, 1813. On November 6, 1813 the rebel Congress of Anáhuac, meeting in Chilpancingo, proclaimed the independence of Mexico. On October 22, 1814 the rebel Congress of Apatzingán promulgated a constitution.

Meanwhile, in Spain, Ferdinand VII had returned to the throne. He abrogated the Spanish Constitution on May 14, 1814, and reestablished government institutions as they had been in 1808. By a decree of July 21, 1814, he reestablished the Inquisition. On May 19, 1816 he authorized the Jesuits to return to Mexico, who had been expelled in the late eighteenth century.

Calleja had been exiling many insurgents to Cuba, and now he began exiling them to the Philippines. With the capture and subsequent execution of Morelos on December 22, 1815, the insurrection once again seemed to be at an end. But it soon broke out anew with the revolt of Vicente Guerrero in the south. Calleja's rule became more dictatorial.

Calleja was a determined, unscrupulous, cruel ruler who tolerated the numerous abuses of his commanders; he was someone to be feared. He was feared, and also hated, even by some of the more liberal royalists. They blamed his brutal methods for causing more rebellion after the death of Morelos. Their complaints against his dictatorial methods were received in the Spanish court and on September 20, 1816, he was relieved of his position.

== Return to Spain ==
He returned to Spain, where he was given the title of Conde de Calderón and the grand crosses of Isabel the Catholic and San Hermenegildo. He was appointed military commander in Andalucía and governor of Cádiz. He was charged with organizing an expeditionary army to America. He was taken prisoner by Rafael Riego, whose uprising against Ferdinand VII initiated the Liberal Restoration of 1820, and remained incarcerated on Mallorca until the collapse of the uprising, whereupon he was freed and restored to his former rank and positions.

He was commander in Valencia at the time of his death in 1828.
