= Battle of Calderón Bridge =

Part of the Mexican War of Independence

- Part of the Mexican War of Independence
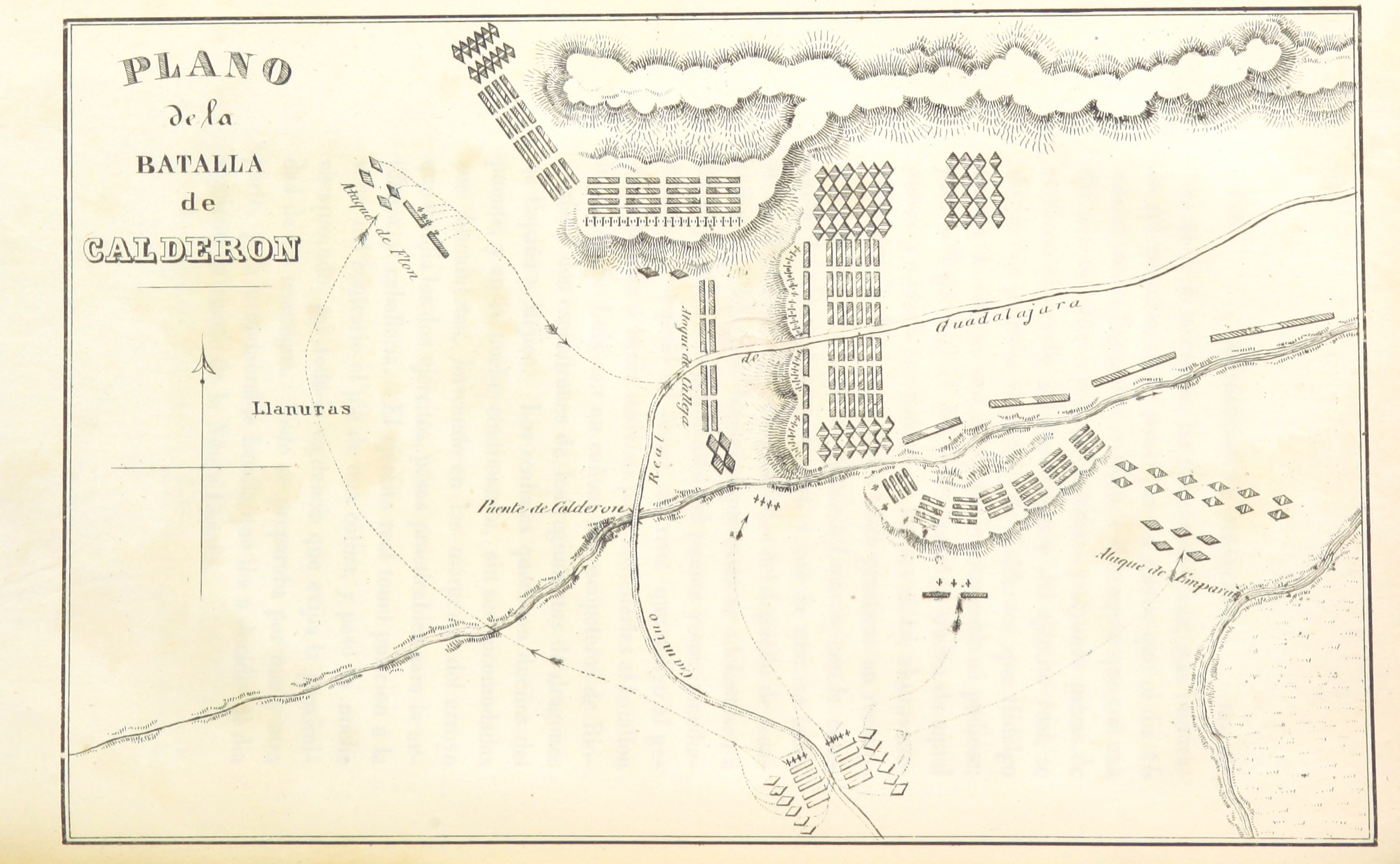
- Plan of the Battle of Calderón Bridge; Note: The south is at the top, indicated by the arrow
Date	17 January 1811
Location	Zapotlanejo, Nueva Galicia, New Spain 20°40′27″N 103°00′43″W
Result	Spanish victory: Insurgent army is diminished and flees north; Ignacio Allende assumes control of the remaining forces; End of the first phase of the Mexican War of Independence

Belligerents
Mexican Insurgents	Kingdom of Spain and the Indies (the Spains); New Spain

Commanders and leaders
Miguel Hidalgo (POW) (executed); Ignacio Allende; Juan Aldama; Mariano Abasolo; Jose Antonio Torres	Félix María Calleja del Rey; Manuel de Flon †; Jose de la Cruz

Strength
35,000 – 90/100,000 irregulars; 20,000 light cavalry); (3,000 armed with muskets); (60,000 armed with primitive weapons); 95 cannons	5,000 – 8,000 regulars; 10 cannons

Casualties and losses
1,200 – 13,000	183 (10 MIA) – 1,000
- Location within Jalisco Battle of Calderón Bridge (Mexico)

The Battle of Calderón Bridge (Spanish: Batalla del Puente de Calderón) was a decisive battle in the Mexican War of Independence. It was fought in January 1811 on the banks of the Calderón River 60 km (37 mi) east of Guadalajara in present-day Zapotlanejo, Jalisco.

Almost 100,000 Mexican revolutionaries contributed to the attack, commanded by Miguel Hidalgo, Ignacio Allende, Juan Aldama and Mariano Abasolo. The Royalist forces of New Spain, made up of between 5,000 and 8,000 professional soldiers fighting for the King of Spain, were led by Félix María Calleja del Rey, a Spanish military officer and (later) viceroy of New Spain. He was also later given the title of conde de Calderón for the Spanish victory.

The battle owes its name to the adjoining bridge, and the combattants' objective. The Battle of Calderón Bridge was the last militant episode of the first stage of the War of Independence. Assuming that the highest estimates of casualties are correct, it was the bloodiest battle in any war of independence fought in the western hemisphere.

== Overview ==
Following Hidalgo's failed attempt to take Mexico City in October 1810, insurgent troops retreated toward Guanajuato, pursued by Royalist forces led by General Félix María Calleja. Unable to defend positions at Aculco, where Calleja's army intercepted the insurgents, Hidalgo decided to continue his army's retreat towards Guadalajara.

The insurgent army, numbering approximately 100,000, took up a defensive position at the Bridge of Calderón, where the road from Guanajuato to Guadalajara crossed the Calderón River. Ignacio Allende commanded the troops at this position.

Among the insurgent forces were 20,000 light cavalry, 3,000 armed with muskets, 60,000 armed with spears, slings, and arrows. Calleja's forces, which numbered between 5,000 and 8,000 but were better equipped than the insurgent forces, arrived at the Bridge on 16 January.

As the battle ensued, Royalist artillery struck an insurgent ammunitions wagon, which caused it to explode. The explosion dispersed much of the insurgent force, giving victory to the much smaller but better disciplined and equipped Royalist forces. Insurgent forces fled northwards after losing the battle with Royalist troops following them.

The insurgents' defeat in this battle effectively was a turning point in the War of Independence and resulted in a ten-year delay before insurgent victory and independence could be achieved.

== Aftermath ==
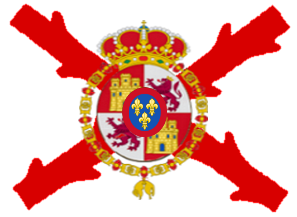
Royal Army

The battle marked the end of the first stage of the war and was noted for the fact that the insurgents fought with more passion than strategy. The insurgent forces were devastated and the events that followed would lead up to the capture and ultimately the executions of Hidalgo, Allende, Aldama and Jiménez.

The insurgents fled north where, in Pabellón de Hidalgo, Hidalgo was divested of his military command in favour of Allende. In March they received an invitation by the New Leonese general Ignacio Elizondo to meet at the Wells of Baján (Norias de Baján) in Coahuila, hoping they would be able to buy weapons in the United States. The first contingent arrived on 21 March with Allende, Aldama, Jiménez and Indalecio, son of Allende. They were welcomed and ambushed, and immediately taken prisoner. When the second contingent arrived with Abasolo, they were also captured and taken prisoner. Hidalgo ultimately arrived on horse and was personally apprehended by Elizondo.

The prisoners were taken to Chihuahua where they were tried. Allende, Aldama and Jiménez were shot on 26 June, Hidalgo on 30 July and Abasolo was sentenced to life in prison in Cádiz, Spain, where he died in 1816.

Calderón Bridge was declared a Mexican historical monument in 1932.

== Bibliography ==
- Benítez, Fernando (1998). Morelos (in Spanish). Fondo de Cultura Económica.
- Alamán, Lucas; Orozco y Berra, Manuel (1853). Diccionario universal de historia y de geografía (in Spanish). Imp. de F. Escalente y c.a.
- Arróniz, Márcos (1857). Manual de biografía mexicana, ó Galería de hombres célebres de México (in Spanish). Librería de Rosa, Bouret y Cia.
- Cumplido, Ignacio (1843). El Museo mexicano, ó, Miscelanea pintoresca de amenidades curiosas é instructivas, Volumen 2 (in Spanish). Lo imprime y publica él mismo.
- Toro, Alfonso (1958). Compendio de historia de México: la revolución de independencia y México independiente (in Spanish). Editorial Patria.
- Clodfelter, Micheal (2017). Warfare and Armed Conflicts: A Statistical Encyclopedia of Casualty and Other Figures, 1492–2015 (4th ed.). McFarland & Company. ISBN 978-0786474707.
- Peña, José Herrera (2003). Hidalgo a la Luz de Sus Escritos: Estudio Preliminar, Cuerpo Documental y Bibliografía (in Spanish). Morelia, Michoacán: Universidad Michoacana de San Nicolás de Hidalgo. ISBN 978-9-70703-217-0.
- Velázquez, Rogelio (2000). Historia de México (in Spanish). Mexico City: Editorial Castillo. ISBN 970-20-0019-X.
- Nieto López, José de Jesús (1998). Historia 3 (in Spanish). Mexico City: Editorial Castillo. ISBN 970-642-214-5.
- Fuentes Mares, José (1984). Historia Ilustrada de México (in Spanish). Mexico City: Editorial Océano. ISBN 968-491-045-2.
- Zárate, Julio (1889). Mécico a Través de Los Siglos (in Spanish). Mexico City: Editorial Cumbre.
- Villalpando, José Manuel (2002). Miguel Hidalgo (in Spanish). Mexico City: Editorial Planeta D'Agostini. ISBN 970-726-050-5.
- Hernández, Maite (2003). Miguel Hidalgo (in Spanish). Madrid: Editorial Dastin. ISBN 978-84-492-0327-5.
- Meyer, Jean (1996). Hidalgo (in Spanish). Mexico: Editorial Clío.
- Young, Philip (1850). History of Mexico, Her Civil Wars, and Colonial and Revolutionary Annals. J.A. & U.P. James.
- Bancroft, Hubert Hugh. History of Mexico, Vol. 4.
