= Manuel de la Concha =

Manuel de la Concha may refer to:

- Manuel de la Concha (officer) (fl. early 19th century), Spanish commissioned officer of the military forces
- Manuel Gutiérrez de la Concha, Marquis of the Duero (1808–1874), Spanish military man
- Manuel Troncoso de la Concha (1878–1955), Dominican politician

== See also ==
- Manuel Concha (disambiguation)
