= Equestrian statue of José María Morelos =

The equestrian statue of José María Morelos may refer to

- Equestrian statue of José María Morelos (Guadalajara), Mexico
- Equestrian statue of José María Morelos (Los Angeles), United States
