= Parque Morelos =

Park in Guadalajara, Jalisco, Mexico

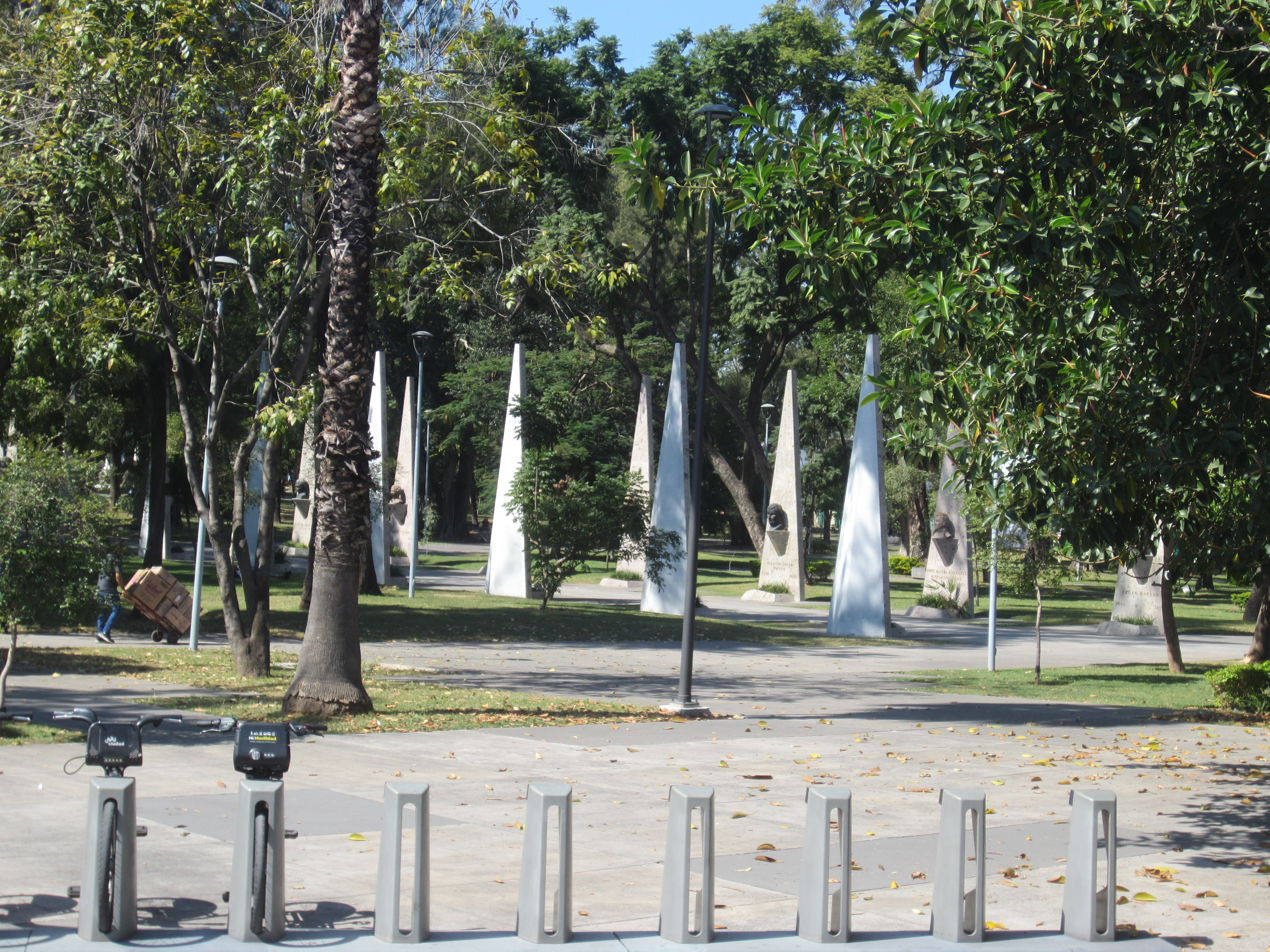
- Monuments in the park in 2021

- Location within Mexico
- Location: Guadalajara, Jalisco, Mexico
- Coordinates: 20°40′49″N 103°20′26″W

Parque Morelos is a public park in Centro, Guadalajara, in the Mexican state of Jalisco.

An equestrian statue of José María Morelos, who led the Mexican War of Independence movement, is installed in the park.
