= Manuel de la Concha (officer) =

Spanish commissioned officer

Manuel de la Concha was a Spanish commissioned officer of the military forces under Félix María Calleja del Rey Bruder Losada Campaño y Montero de Espinosa, Viceroy of New Spain; his rank was Colonel. In 1815 Manuel de la Concha apprehended insurgent General José María Morelos y Pavón.

== See also ==
- Battle of Azcapotzalco
- Battle of Temalaca

== Bibliography ==
- Timmons, Wilbert H.; Morelos: Priest, Soldier, Statesman of Mexico. Texas Western College Press; First Edition (1963). ASIN B0007IU0F0.
