= Siege of Acapulco (1813) =

1813 battle in Mexico

Coordinates: 16°51′46.33″N 99°53′13.24″W

- Part of the Mexican War of Independence
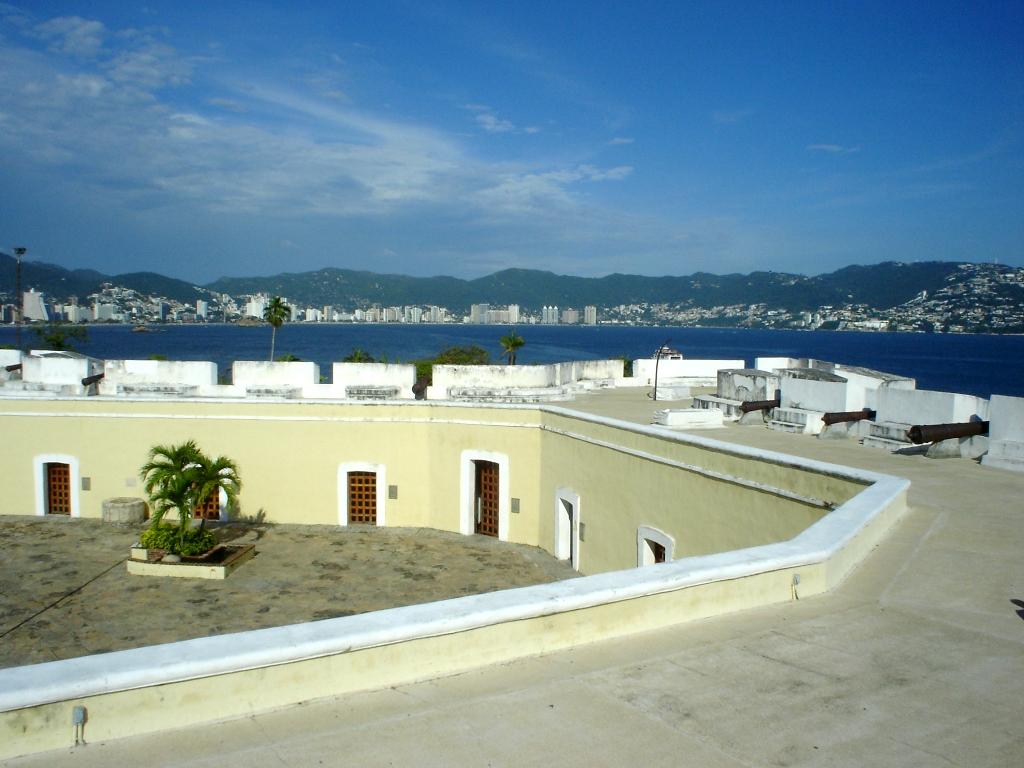
- A view of Acapulco de Juárez from the Fuerte de San Diego where one can see the strategically important high ground of El Valedero in the background.
Date	12 April 1813
Location	Acapulco de Juárez, Guerrero, Mexico
Result	Mexican Rebel victory

Belligerents
Mexican Rebels	Spanish Empire

Commanders and leaders
José María Morelos	Pedro Antonio Vélez

The siege of Acapulco was a battle of the War of Mexican Independence that occurred on 12 April 1813 at Acapulco de Juárez. The battle was fought between the royalist forces loyal to the Spanish crown, commanded by Pedro Antonio Vélez, and the Mexican rebels fighting for independence from the Spanish Empire, commanded by José María Morelos. The prestigious battle resulted in a victory for the Mexican rebels.

== The battle ==
After a series of skirmishes leading up to the actual siege, Mexican rebel forces were finally able to besiege the city and take the plaza of Acapulco on 12 April 1813. The Spanish forces took refuge in the Fuerte de San Diego where they were able to continue to resist the insurgent attacks until August of the same year when a truce was signed between José María Morelos and Pedro Antonio Vélez. The rebel victory was strategically important because the port was one of the largest and most important to the strategic objectives laid out by Morelos at the start of the campaign.
