= Reward offered for Morelos y Pavón's head =

1812 document written by Francisco Xavier Venegas

Reward offered for José María Morelos y Pavón's head is a document written by viceroy Francisco Xavier Venegas and published on 26 March 1812. It contains the policy to suppress military insurrections. It was written during the second stage of the Mexican Independence War comprising the years 1810 to 1815.

== Content of the document ==
For this document Viceroy Francisco Javier Vegas was required to confirm there was a prize for José María Morelos' head. The document was approved three days after its creation on 23 March 1812.
