= Battle of Temalaca =

- Part of the Mexican War of Independence
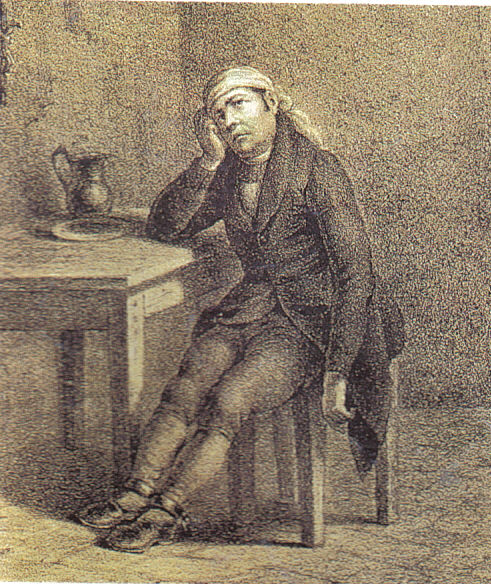
- A painting of José María Morelos in prison at the Cárcel del Arzobispado after his capture at Temalaca.
Date	5 November 1815
Location	Temalaca, Guerrero, Mexico
Result	Spanish Royalist victory

Belligerents
Mexican Rebels	Spanish Empire

Commanders and leaders
José María Morelos (POW) (executed)	Manuel de la Concha

The Battle of Temalaca took place during the War of Mexican Independence on 5 November 1815 in the area around Temalaca, Puebla. The battle was fought between the royalist forces loyal to the Spanish crown and the Mexican rebels fighting for independence from the Spanish Empire. The Mexican insurgents were commanded by José María Morelos and the Spanish by Manuel de la Concha. The battle resulted in a victory for the Spanish Royalists.

At the end of the battle, Morelos was captured by Spanish forces under whose control he was soon after executed ending the second phase of the Mexican War of Independence.

== See also ==
- Mexican War of Independence
- José María Morelos

== Bibliography ==
- Bustamante, Carlos María de (1846). Cuadro histórico de la revolución mexicana, comenzada en 15 de septiembre de 1810 por el ciudadano Miguel Hidalgo y Costilla, Cura del pueblo de los Dolores (in Spanish). México DF: Impr. de JM Lara.
