= Manuel Concha (disambiguation) =

Manuel Concha (born 1980) is a Swedish film director of Chilean descent.

Manuel Concha may also refer to:

- Manuel Concha Martínez (born 1939), Chilean military engineer and political figure, president of the Central Bank of Chile in 1989
- Manuel Concha Pedregal (1881–1939), Chilean police officer, director of the Carabineros in 1931–1932

== See also ==
- Manuel de la Concha (disambiguation)
