= Fort of San Diego =

Bastion fort in Acapulco, Mexico

Fort San Diego
- Fuerte de San Diego
- Acapulco, Guerrero, Mexico
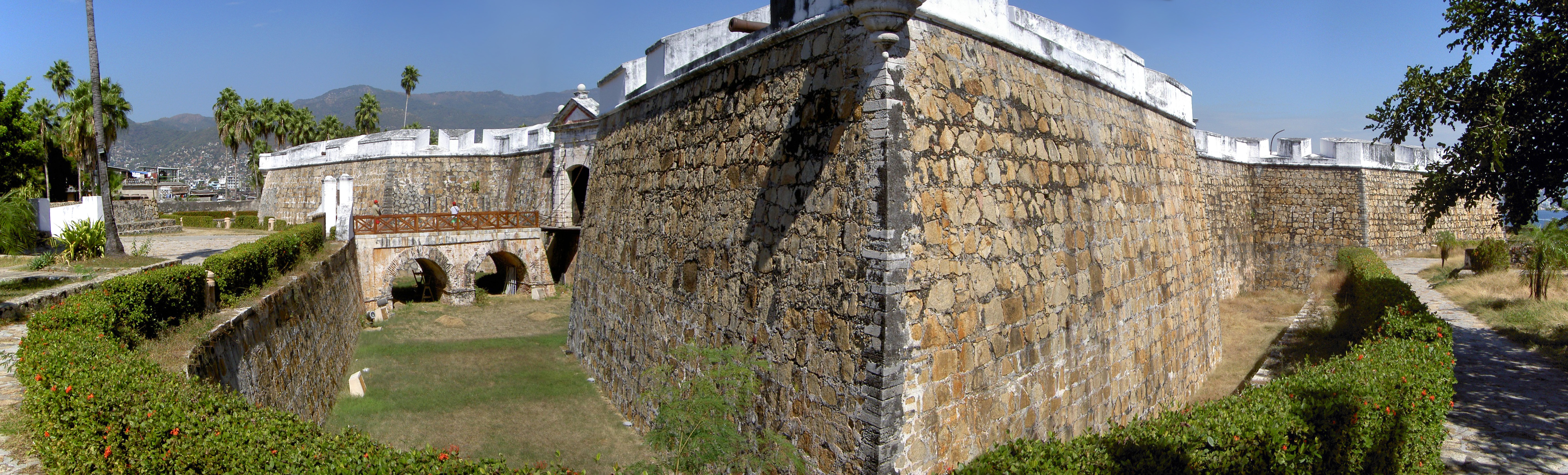
- View of the Fort of San Diego

Site information
- Type: Star fort
- Controlled by: Instituto Nacional de Antropología e Historia
- Open to the public: Yes
- Condition: Intact
- Website: Official website

Location
- Coordinates: 16°51′0″N 99°54′8.6″W

Site history
- Built: 1616–1617 (first fort); 1778–1783 (second fort)
- Built by: Spanish Empire
- Materials: Stone
- Battles/wars: Mexican War of Independence; French intervention in Mexico; Mexican Revolution

Garrison information
- Past commanders: Pedro Antonio Vélez (1813)

The Fort of San Diego (Spanish: Fuerte de San Diego), formerly also known as the Fort of San Carlos (Spanish: Fuerte de San Carlos) is a star fort in Acapulco, Guerrero, Mexico. It was built by the Spanish Empire, and it was one of the most important Spanish fortifications along the Pacific coast. The fort was first built in the 17th century, but was completely rebuilt in the 18th century. Today, it is an important landmark in Acapulco, and it is open to the public as the Acapulco Historic Museum (Spanish: Museo Histórico de Acapulco).

== History ==
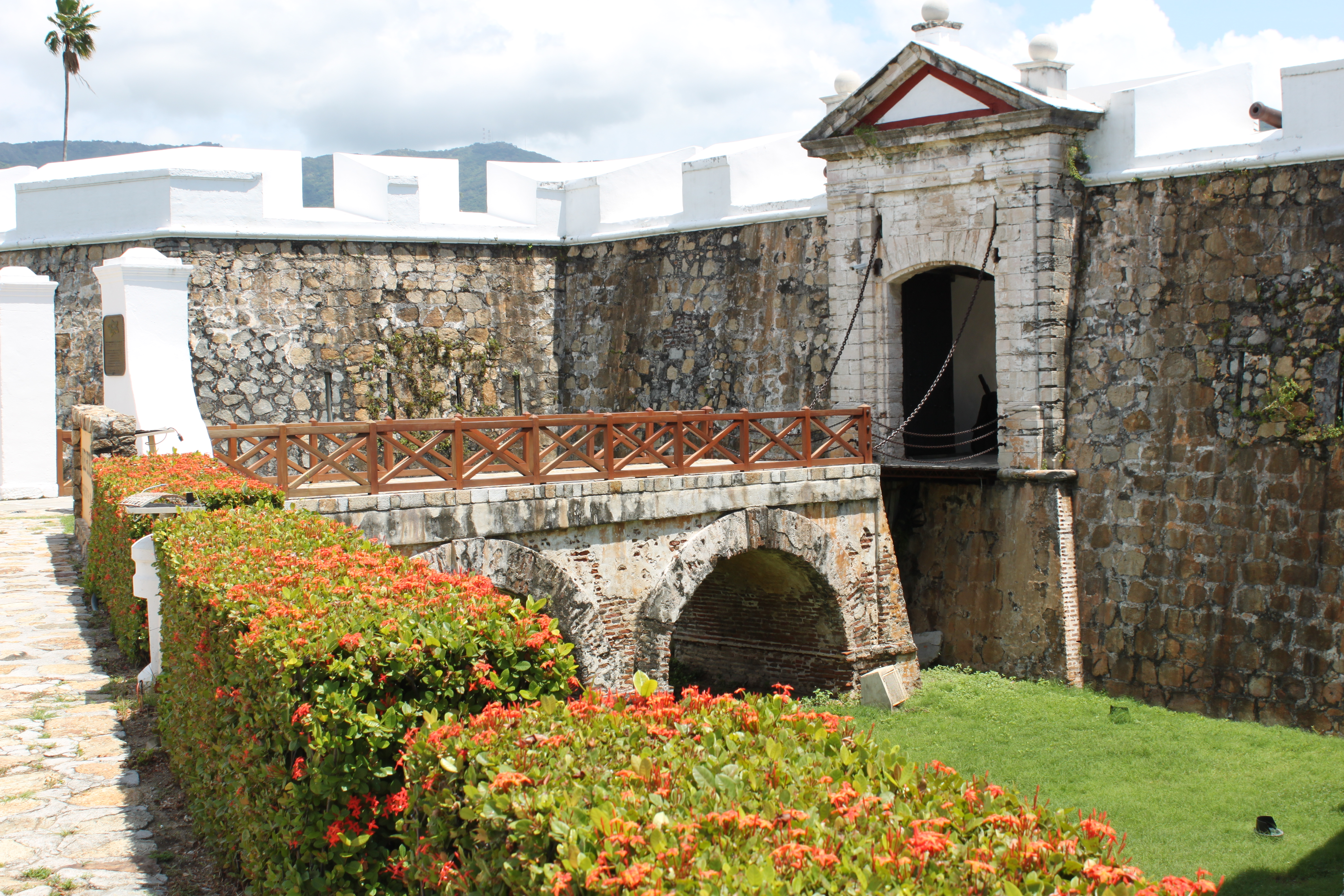
The fort's gate

The Fort of San Diego was built by the Spanish Empire to protect Acapulco from attacks by pirates, since the city was an important trading port, being the point of departure for the Manila galleons. The fort was first built by Viceroy Diego Fernández de Córdoba, Marquis of Guadalcázar, and was completed in 1617 to designs of the Dutch military engineer Adrián Boot.

The fort was extensively damaged in an earthquake in 1776, and it was demolished and rebuilt to designs of Ramón Panón. Construction of the new fort began in 1778, and it was completed in 1783. The new fort was given the name Fuerte de San Carlos in honour of the reigning monarch, King Carlos III, but it was still called Fuerte de San Diego by most people, and the new name eventually fell out of use.

The fort saw use during the Mexican War of Independence, and its Spanish garrison under the command of Pedro Antonio Vélez resisted insurgent attacks for several months until it fell to the Mexicans under José María Morelos on 19 August 1813. The fort remained an active military installation of the Mexican Army, serving the Secretariat of War and Navy in the late 19th century. The fort also saw use during the French intervention in Mexico and the Mexican Revolution.

=== Recent history ===
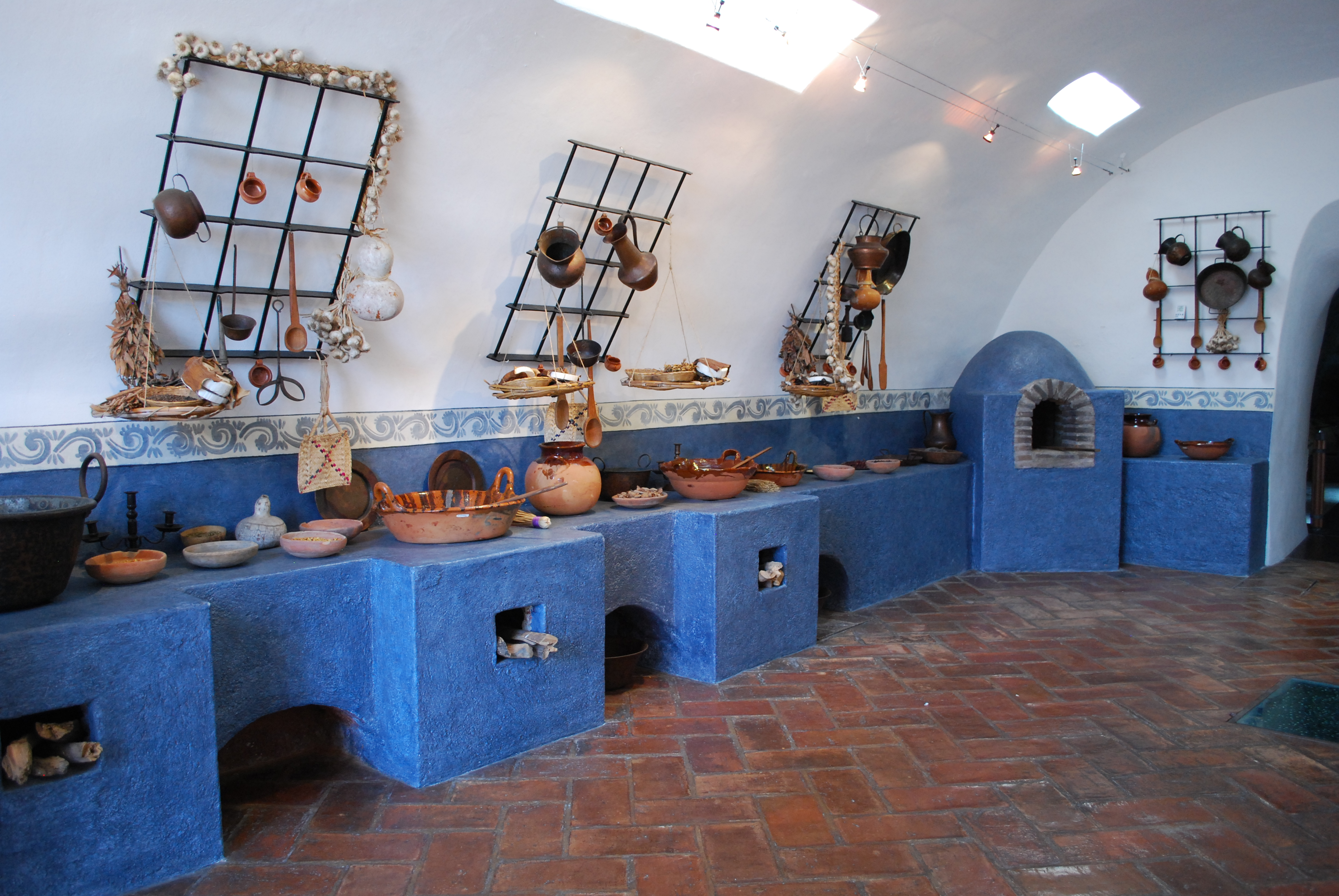
Exhibits of the Acapulco Historic Museum in the fort

It was handed to the Secretaría de Bienes Nacionales e Inspección Administrativa in 1949 in order to be converted into a military museum. It was administered by the Instituto Nacional de Antropología e Historia (INAH) until 1964, when it was handed to the Secretariat of Public Education to be used by the Instituto Nacional de Bellas Artes y Literatura. In 1970, it was handed to the Junta de Mejoras Materiales del Puerto de Acapulco and it was used for cultural and artistic purposes.

The fort was handed back to INAH in 1980, and it was opened to the public as a museum in 1986. The museum is dedicated to the history of Acapulco, and its exhibits include archaeological remains from the Mezcala culture and artifacts relating to the Manila galleons, piracy, the Mexican War of Independence as well as exhibits about the fort itself.

The museum is open to the public on Tuesdays through Sundays. Admission on Sunday is free.

== Layout ==
=== First fort ===
The original fort as designed by Adrián Boot had an irregular pentagonal shape, and its five bastions were called:

- Baluarte del Rey (King's Bastion)
- Baluarte del Príncipe (Prince's Bastion)
- Baluarte del Duque (Duke's Bastion)
- Baluarte del Marqués (Marquis' Bastion)
- Baluarte de Guadalcázar (Guadalcázar Bastion)

=== Second fort ===
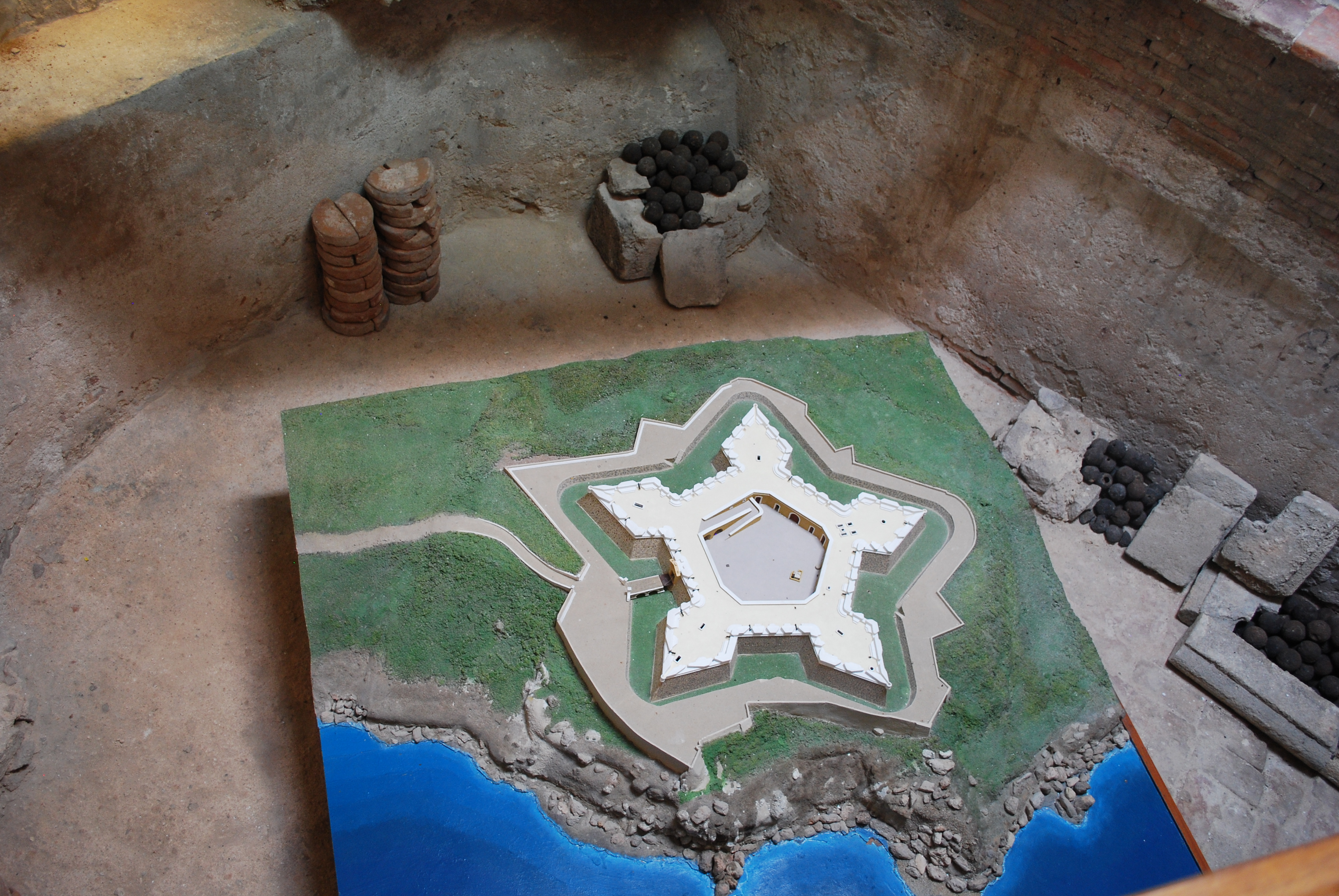
Model of the Fort of San Diego showing its layout

The present fort as designed by Ramón Panón is in the shape of a regular pentagon, and its five bastions are called:

- Baluarte de San José (St. Joseph Bastion)
- Baluarte de San Antonio (St. Anthony Bastion)
- Baluarte de San Luis (St. Louis Bastion)
- Baluarte de Santa Bárbara (St. Barbara Bastion)
- Baluarte de la Concepción (Conception Bastion)

Each bastion had a guerite on its salient, but these were demolished in the 1970s.

== See also ==
- Military of New Spain
