= Military of New Spain =

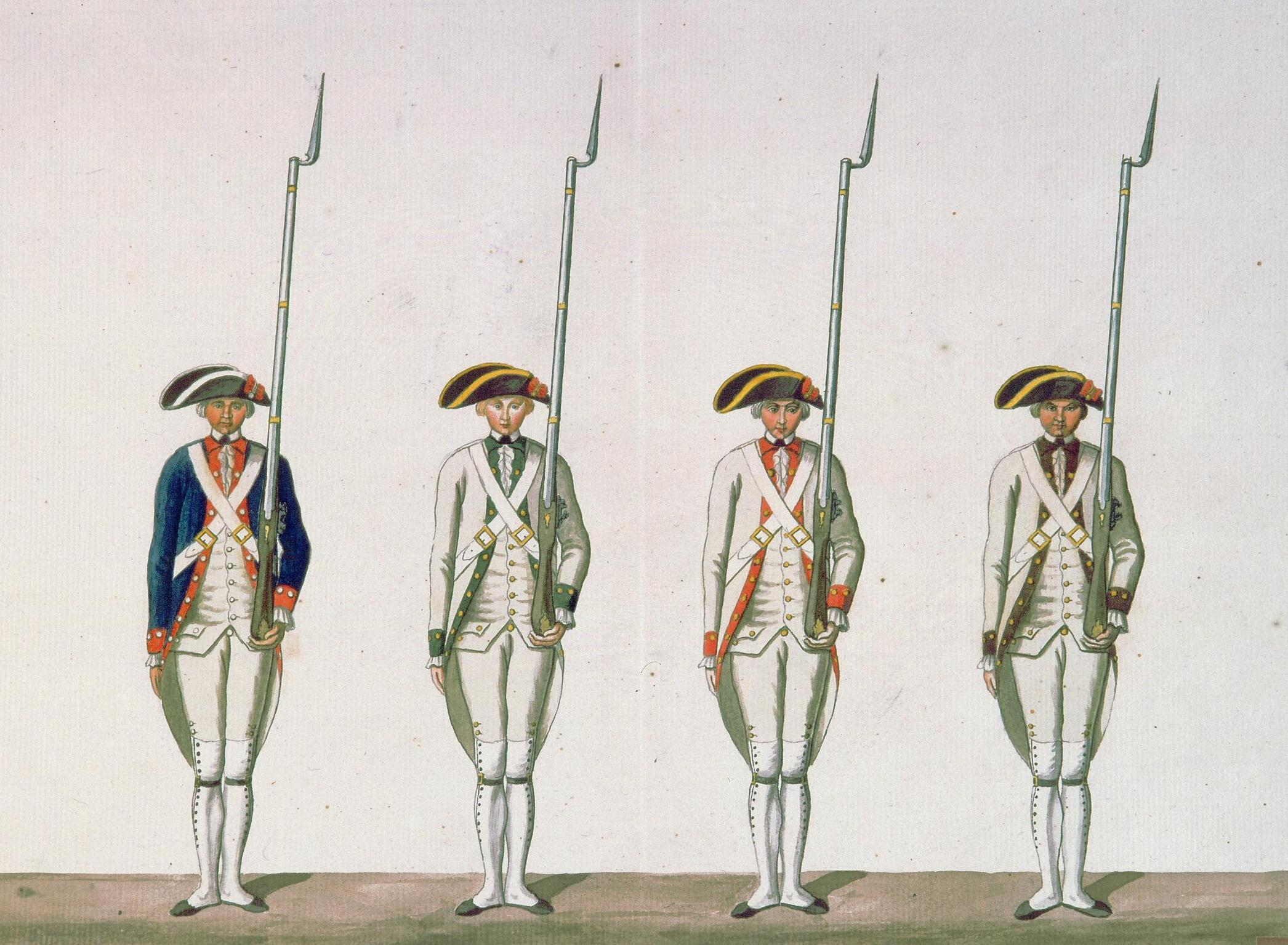
Uniforms of four line infantry regiments raised in New Spain under the Bourbon Reforms in 1788

The military of New Spain played an insignificant role during the 17th century. The new Mexican society growing on the ruins left by the conquest was peaceful. A very limited number of regular troops, a couple of companies, were enough to keep the peace. The defense against external enemies was based on a limited number of fortified port cities. Spanish conflicts with the British Empire during the 18th century changed this. The Bourbon Reforms resulted in the transfer of regular Spanish Army troops from Spain to New Spain, the raising several colonial line infantry regiments, and the creation of a colonial militia which also included former slaves. The northern frontier was the exception to the peacefulness of Mexico, with constant warfare with the nomadic Native Americans.

== Seventeenth century ==
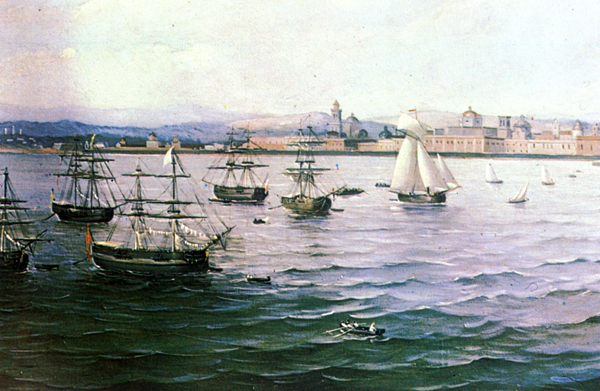
Fort San Juan de Ulúa, the Spanish fortress in Veracruz.

In sharp contrast to New France's militarization, but also in contrast to the experience of the Thirteen Colonies during the French and Indian Wars, the military in New Spain played an insignificant role during the 17th century. The new Mexican society growing on the ruins left by the conquest was peaceful. The indigenous population was unarmed and the few popular uprisings could easily be defeated and posed no serious threat to Spanish power. In the interior of Mexico, there were only a couple of regular companies, which in the event of disruptions could be strengthened with levies from the merchant, haciendados, and artisan classes. The geographical limitations insulated the interior of Mexico from external enemies. The silver mines in the north were secured by the large desert areas that a hostile army could not penetrate. The deadly tropical diseases on the Caribbean coast, the lack of suitable bases on the West Coast, and the long and poor road network, made the coastal regions of the Gulf of Mexico, the only areas in need of defense, against hostile powers, pirates and smugglers.

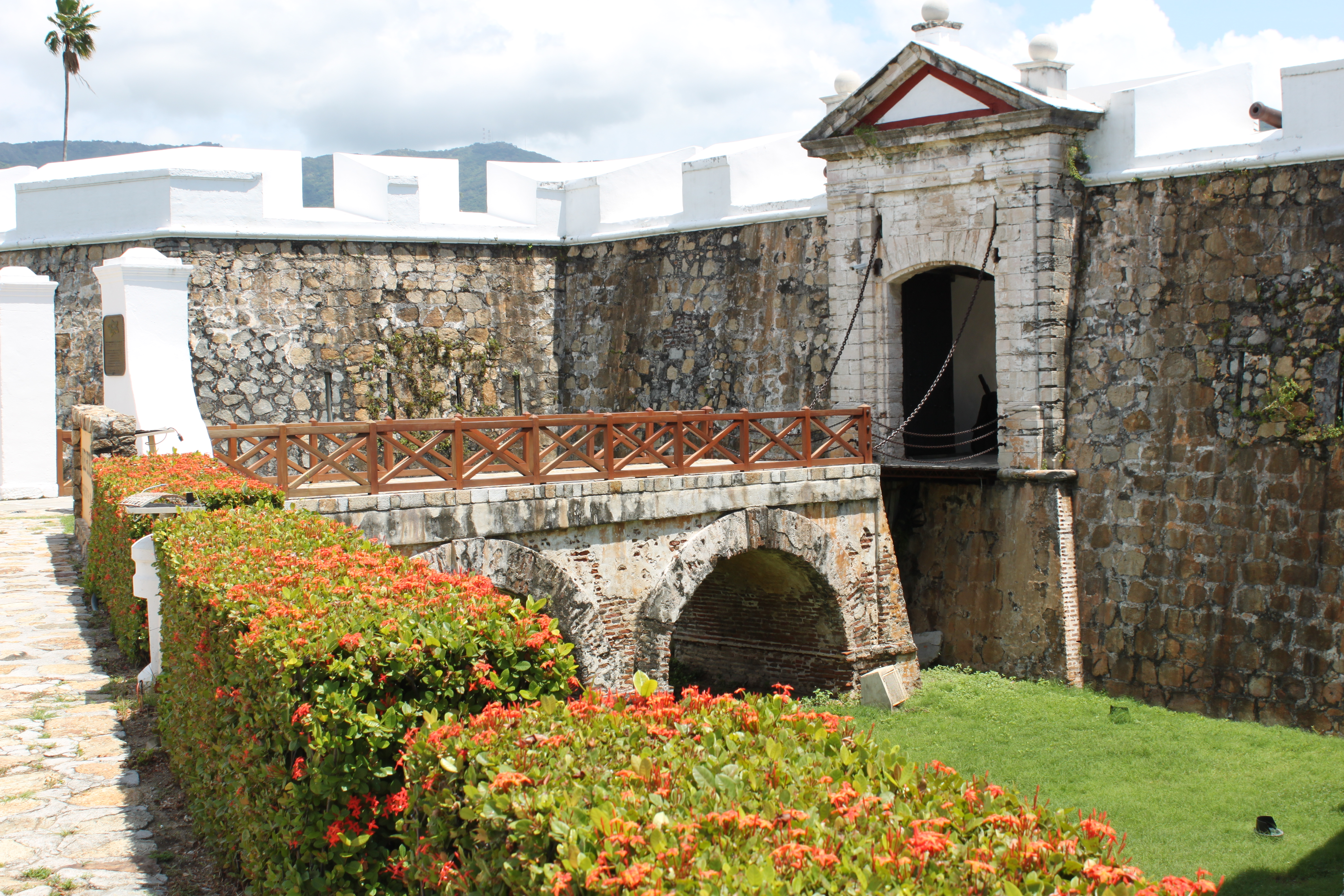
The Fort of San Diego in Acapulco.

The defense of New Spain against external enemies was based on a limited number of fortified port cities. On the west coast, there were no serious threats and the small Fort of San Diego in Acapulco, the port of call for the Manila galleon, was enough to meet all foreseeable contingencies. In the Caribbean, there were stronger fortifications to secure maritime communications with the mother country. The dominant winds led the silver galleons through the Straits of Florida; the fortress city of Havana, and the fortifications of St. Augustine in Florida, protected the only point where New Spain could really be threatened. On the surrounding mainland there were also strong fortress cities with regular garrisons. On the Mexican mainland it was Veracruz; in Yucatan, Campeche; and in the New Granada, Cartagena de Indias. As long as these fortresses could be held or quickly relieved, and as long as the large annual convoys could be assembled, there were no serious threats against New Spain.

== Eighteenth century ==
During the eighteenth century, Spanish conflicts with Britain threatened the strategic position of New Spain. The British government used its naval supremacy to its advantage during its many wars with the Dutch Republic, the Kingdom of France and the Kingdom of Spain. During the Seven Years War, Havana was captured by the British. However, New Spain never came under any significant threat of capture by any foreign nation, and thus continued under Spanish rule until the Mexican War of Independence.

The main goal of the Bourbon reforms in New Spain was to strengthen its defensive capabilities, although it led to significant social and political changes. Militarily, the reform aimed to strengthen the coastal fortifications, increasing the size of local garrisons by raising more colonial troops, and to rotate units between Spain and its colonies on a regular basis. The military reforms in themselves did not alter social relationships, but since the military buildup in Spain proper limited the means available for colonial defense, the reformers decided to arm the colonial population. Hence, a disciplined and organized permanent militia was created. Although mainly consisting of criollos, it was still considered new and dangerous to arm any others than peninsulares. The lack of suitable criollo recruits in some areas led the Spanish military authorities to organize militia units of pardos and morenos. The arming of people of color was an even greater breach with traditional policy than arming white Mexicans.

== Northern frontier ==
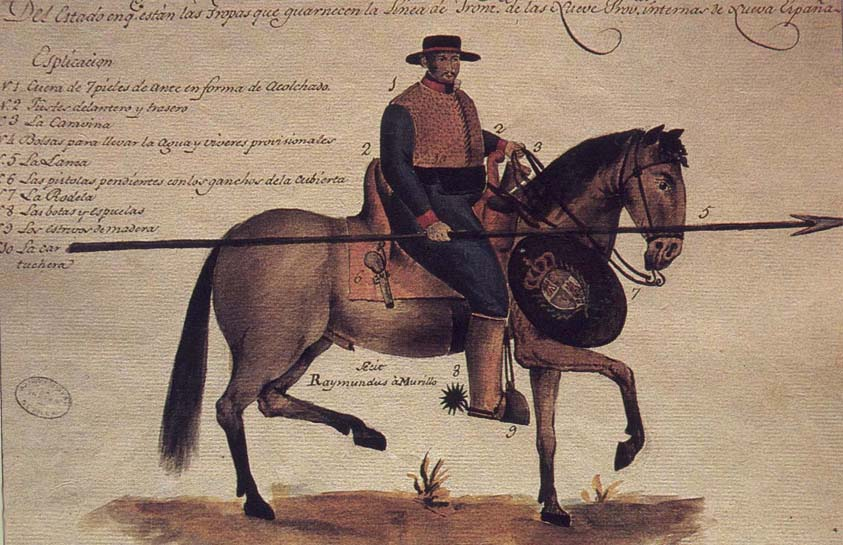
Dragon de cuera from the end of the eighteenth century.

The northern frontier, the Provincias Internas, with its population of nomadic Indians, was the only warlike area in Mexico. Apaches, Navaho, Comanches, and other native peoples not subordinated to the Spanish authorities, attacked the settled population, both the Spanish speakers, living on mission stations and cattle ranches or in mining villages, and the Pueblo Indians living in their prehistoric villages. The frontier area contained a third of Mexico's territory, and only one road, the Camino Real de Tierra Adentro, connected the frontier with Mexico City, 2,000 km away. The defenses of the northern frontier consisted of a series of forts or strongholds, presidios. They were garrisoned by a special type of soldiers, the soldados de cuera, whose equipment was adapted to Native American warfare. They took their name from the heavy leather armor they wore in the field as a protection against Indian arrows. Besides them, and their Indian scouts (Indios exploradores), Indian auxiliaries (Indios auxiliaries) under Spanish command fought against the nomadic Indians. A special form of Indian auxiliaries was the Indios amigos that fought under their own captains.

== Military units of New Spain ==
=== Eighteenth century before the Bourbon Reforms ===
Unit	Companies	Officers	Enlisted
Viceroyal Palace in Ciudad de México
Halberdiers	1	2	23
Infantry	1	4	220
Cavalry	1	4	103
Fort San Juan de Ulúa, Veracruz
Armada de Barlovento, Battalion of Marines	6	18	600
Dragoons of Veracruz	5	?	?
Infantry battalion La Corona	6	23	552
Artillery	1	2	118
Fort of San Diego, Acapulco
Infantry	1	1	51
Artillery	-	-	13
Isla del Carmen
Infantry	1	3	78
Dragoons	1	3	53
Artillery	-	-	25
San Miguel de Panzacola, Pensacola, Florida
Infantry	2	4	160
Artillery	-	-	20
Northern Frontier
Texas	5	12	253
Coahuila	3	7	113
Nuevo México	2	6	125
Nueva Vizcaya	5	15	231
Sonora	5	14	222
California	2	2	58
Milicias Urbanas in Ciudad de México
Infantry	8	..	~1850
Cavalry	4	..	~750

=== Veteran Troops after the Bourbon Reforms (1799) ===
Place	Unit	Strength
Ciudad de México	Compañía de Alabarderos de la Guardia del Virrey	25
Ciudad de México	Regimiento de Infantería fijo de México	979
Ciudad de México	Real Cuerpo de Artillería	1,910
Ciudad de México	Real Cuerpo de Ingenerios	9
Ciudad de México	Regimiento Veterano de Dragones de España (Note: Also in Xalapa and Sonora)	461
Veracruz	Regimiento de Infantería de la Corona, fijo de Nueva España	979
Veracruz	Regimiento de Infantería fijo de Nueva España	979
Veracruz	Batallón de Infantería fijo de Veracruz	1,000
Puebla and Sonora	Regimiento Veterano de Dragones de México	461
Sonora and California	Compañía fija de Infantería Ligera Voluntarios de Cataluña	150
Acapulco	Compañía fija de Infantería de Acapulco	77
Isla del Carmen	Compañía fija de Presidio de Isla del Carmen	100
Isla del Carmen	Compañía de Dragones de Presidio de Isla del Carmen	43
San Blas	Compañía fija de Infantería de San Blas	105
Campeche	Batallón fijo de Infantería de Campeche	550

=== Dragones de cuera ===
==== 1701 ====
Presidio/Unit	Strength
Nueva Vizcaya
Casas Grandes	50
San Francisco de Conchos	50
San Pedro del Gallo	45
Nuestra Señora del Pasaje de Cuencame	45
Cerro Gordo	23
Field companies of Parral and Durango	45
Nuevo México
El Paso	50
Santa Fe	100
Sonora
Flying company	50
Nuveo León
Cerralvo	10
Caldereta	10
Coahuila
San Francisco	25
Other provinces
Sinaloa	41
Tamos	4
Santa Catalina de Tape Huames	9

==== 1717 ====
Presidio/Unit	Strength
Nuevo México	100
Sinaloa	43
Coahuila	25
Paso del Rio del Norte	49
Cerralvo, Calderita y León	20
Cuencalné	40
San Antonio Casas Grandes	50
Sonora	50
Conchos	50
Gallo	43
Pasaje	45
Cerro Gordo	23
Santa Catarina de Tepehuenes	9
Durango	15
Field company	30

==== 1764 ====
Presidios and their strength in the several provinces:

Texas

- Bahía del Espíritu Santo, 51
- Adaes, 61
- San Sabá, 101
- Trinidad, 31

Bejar, 23

- Nuevo México
- Santa Fe, 81
- El Paso, 50

Nayarit

- Nayarit, 43

Nueva Vizcaya

Junta de los Ríos, 50 Janos, 51 Guajoquilla, 51

Coahuila

Rio Grande. 33 San Francisco de Coahuila. 36 Santa Rosa del Sacramento. 52

Nuevo León

San Agustín Ahumada, 27

Sonora

Corodeguachi, 51 Guebavi, 51 Horcasitas, 51 Tubac, 51 Caborca (Altar), 51 Buenavista, 51

California

Loreto, 30 San José del Cabo, 30

Nuevo Santander

- Santa Ana Calnargo, 13
- Villa de San Fernando, 10
- Villa de San Antonio Padilla, 5
- Nuestra Señora De Loreto de Burgos, 12
- Santa Maria de Llera, 12
- San Francisco de Güemes, 8
- San Juan Bautista Horcasitas, 11
- Dulce Nombre de Jesús Escandan, 9
- Soto la Marina, 11
- Cinco Señores de Santander, 22
- Reinosa, 11
- Santa Maria de Aguayo, 1
- San Antonio Padilla, 12
