= Battle of Azcapotzalco =

1821 Mexican War of Independence battle

- Part of Mexican War of Independence
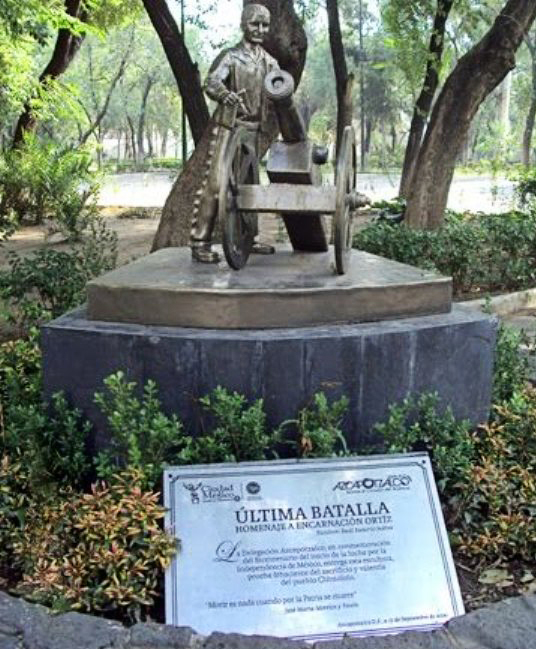
- Memorial of the Battle in Azcapotzalco
Date	August 19, 1821
Location	Azcapotzalco (today Mexico City)
Result	Disputed. Both sides claim victory.

Belligerents
Trigarante Army	Spanish Empire

Commanders and leaders
Luis Quintanar; Anastasio Bustamante	Manuel de la Concha

Strength
16,000	3,000

The Battle of Azcapotzalco, (Spanish: Batalla de Azcapotzalco), was fought on August 19, 1821, in the town of Azcapotzalco, near Mexico City. It was to be one of the last military action of the Mexican War of Independence. The insurgents, commanded by the colonels Anastasio Bustamante and Luis Quintanar, fought the Spanish forces commanded by Manuel de la Concha.

== Prelude ==
By August 1821, The Army of the Three Guarantees, led by Agustin de Iturbide, had control of the majority of towns and important cities of New Spain, leaving only the royalist bastions of Mexico City and the port of Veracruz. Mexico City as capital of the Viceroyalty of New Spain was the key point for ending the 11 year Mexican War of Independence. The Army of the Three Guarantees had surrounded the periphery of the city and the royalist forces were forced into Tacuba (today Miguel Hidalgo) and the old Hacienda of Clavería.

== Battle ==
Before the battle Agustín de Iturbide went to Córdoba to have a meeting with the Political Superior Chief, (Note: The Political Superior Chief (Spanish: Jefe Político Superior) was the name given in the Constitution of Cadiz of 1812, to the highest political and administrative officer of the provinces in which the Spanish territories were divided, both in Europe and overseas. According with the new constitutional system, the Viceroyalty of New Spain and the other kingdoms in the Americas ceased to exist and were divided in juridical equal provinces ruled by a Political Superior Chief appointed by the King of Spain and a provincial council. In the Mexican history the five political chiefs of New Spain are also known as Viceroys.) Juan O'Donojú, he left command of the troops around Mexico City to Luis Quintanar and Anastasio Bustamante. Bustamante successfully occupied the Haciendas of Cristo and Careaga, (today known as Rosario and Molino de la Hacienda Santa Mónica) and from there he took the next step into Mexico City. On 19 August 1821, the insurgent, Nicolas Acosta, entered Azcapotzalco and took over the Rosario bridge with the purpose of attacking the royalist forces. The attack began in the middle of a rainstorm. As soon as the battle began, the royalist general Manuel de la Concha went to his headquarters in Tacubaya for reinforcements.

The insurgents retired to Azcapotzalco, sending troops to the Hacienda of Careaga. General Concha followed and tried to force them to face him in Azcapotzalco. When the royalist forces arrived, the insurgent forces attacked them in the vestibule and the ceilings of the Convent of the Dominicos. The combat continued until 11 am and stopped when the insurgent ammunition ran out.

Anastasio Bustamante ordered a cannon placed at the entrance of the town but it was unfruitful and he decided to retreat. The famous insurgent soldier Encarnación Ortiz also known as El Pachondo tried to rescue the artillery but was shot and killed. The act inflamed the insurgents who assaulted the vestibule, facing the royalist forces hand-to-hand, defeating them and forcing them to flee to the Rosario Bridge.

== Aftermath ==
The victory by the insurgent forces of the Army of the Three Guarantees forced the royalists to leave the Haciendas of Clavería, Tacuba, Popotla and San Jacinto. Days later independence was granted. The victory of the insurgents in the last battle of the war cleared the way to Mexico City which was finally taken by the insurgents on 27 September 1821, ending the long Mexican War of Independence.

Valentin Canalizo also fought in this battle. He, like Anastasio Bustamante, would later become President of Mexico.

== Bibliography ==
- Cosio Villegas, Daniel (1880). "Historia General de Mexico 1". Historia General de Mexico (in Spanish). Vol. III. México: Ballescá y compañía.
- Zárate, Julio (1976). "La Guerra de Independencia". In Vicente Riva Palacio (ed.). México a través de los siglos (in Spanish). Vol. I. México: El Colegio de Mexico.
