= José María Morelos =

Mexican priest and rebel leader of Mexican War of Independence (1765–1815)

The Reverend José María Morelos
- Posthumous portrait of Morelos by Francisco de Paula Sánchez in 1890

President of the Supreme Mexican Government
- In office 24 October 1814 – 5 November 1815
- Preceded by: Post established
- Succeeded by: Ignacio Alas

Chief of the Congress of Anáhuac
- In office 15 September 1813 – 24 October 1814
- Preceded by: Post established
- Succeeded by: Himself as president under the Constitution of Apatzingan

Member of the Council of Zitacuaro
- In office 19 August 1811 – 15 September 1813

Personal details
- Born: 30 September 1765 Valladolid, Michoacán, New Spain
- Died: 22 December 1815 (aged 50) San Cristóbal Ecatepec, State of Mexico, New Spain
- Cause of death: Execution by firing squad
- Resting place: Angel of Independence, Mexico City
- Children: Juan Nepomuceno Almonte
- Education: Universidad Michoacana de San Nicolás de Hidalgo
- Profession: Arriero, Priest, Military leader, Politician
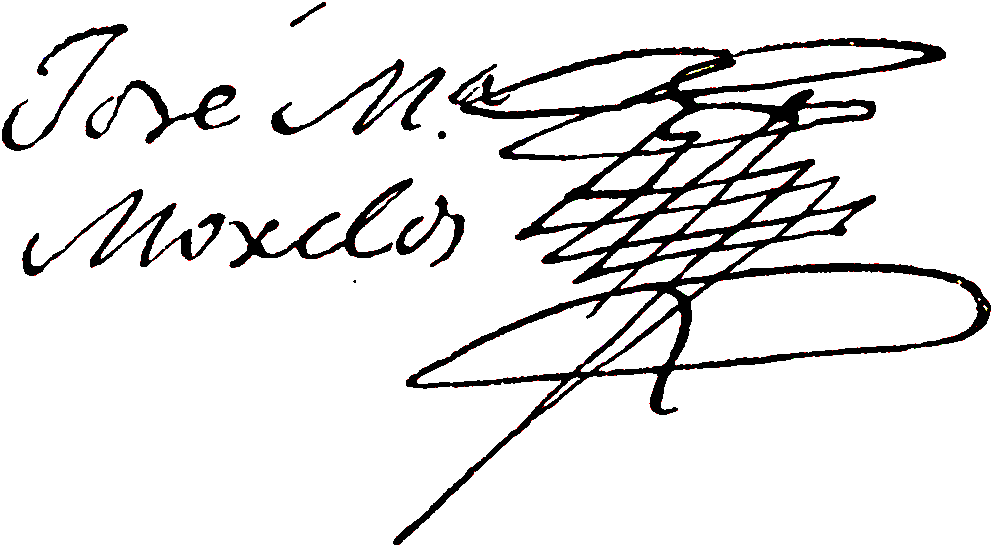
- Signature

Military service
- Allegiance: Mexico
- Branch/service: Mexican Insurgent Army
- Years of service: 1810–1815
- Rank: Generalissimo, Captain General, Colonel
- Battles/wars: Mexican War of Independence; Battle of El Veladero; Battle of Tenancingo; Siege of Cuautla; Siege of Huajuapan de León; Battle of Escamela; Battle of Zitlala; Capture of Orizaba; Capture of Oaxaca; Siege of Acapulco; Battle of Lomas de Santa María; Battle of Temalaca

José María Teclo Morelos Pérez y Pavón (Spanish: [xosemaˈɾi.a ˈteklo moˈɾelos ˈpeɾes i paˈβon]; 30 September 1765 – 22 December 1815) was a Mexican Catholic priest, statesman, and military leader who led the Mexican War of Independence movement, assuming its leadership after the execution of Miguel Hidalgo y Costilla in 1811.

Born in Valladolid, Michoacán, Morelos studied at Colegio de San Nicolás and was appointed priest of Carácuaro in 1799. He joined Miguel Hidalgo's Cry of Dolores, soon becoming an insurgency leader. Aided by local peoples, along with revolutionary leaders Mariano Matamoros and Ignacio López Rayón, Morelos occupied territories in southern and central New Spain, leading the Siege of Cuautla and capturing Acapulco, New Spain's main port in the Pacific Ocean. His campaigns galvanized regional insurgencies against Spanish rule, which made him the royalist army's main rival.

In 1813, Morelos wrote Sentimientos de la Nación, a document influenced by the Constitution of Cádiz where he outlined his program for the Mexican nation. Under his leadership, the Congress of Anáhuac was installed in Chilpancingo, and on 6 November 1813 declared the independence of Mexico. On 22 October 1814, the Constitution of Apatzingán drafted by Congress declared that Mexico would be a Republic.

After a series of defeats, Morelos was captured by the royalist army in Temalaca, Puebla. He was tried by the Inquisition, defrocked as a cleric, and executed by civil authorities in San Cristóbal Ecatepec on 22 December 1815. Morelos is considered a national hero in Mexico, who despite not having a military background became a successful insurgency leader, credited with organizing and bolstering the War of Independence. The Mexican state of Morelos and city of Morelia are named after him.

== Early life ==
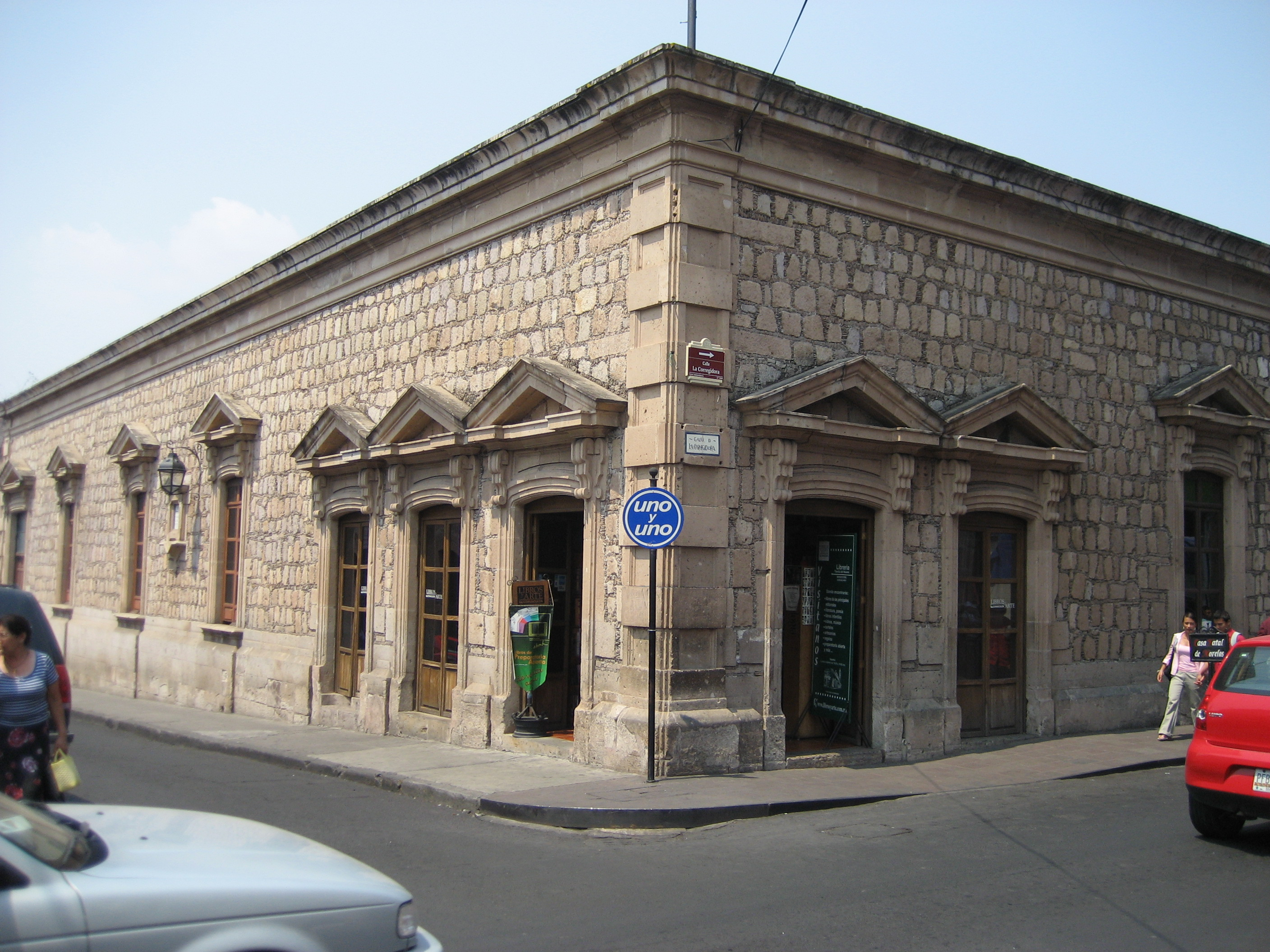
Birthplace and house of Morelos in Morelia, today a museum.

Morelos was born in Valladolid, since renamed Morelia. Although often portrayed as being of "mixed" or "indigenous" descent, Morelos was classified as a Spaniard (español) in his baptismal register, a system in which the Catholic Church kept separate registers for ethnic affiliation. Although ethnic affiliation was fluid in colonial Spanish America, his family was considered as Spaniard according to the social categories of the time. His paternal ancestry included Spaniards, Africans, and Mestizos, whereas his maternal family was fully Spanish.

His father was José Manuel Morelos y Robles, a carpenter originally from Zindurio, a village west of Valladolid. His mother was Juana María Guadalupe Pérez Pavón, originally from San Juan Bautista de Apaseo, also near Valladolid. Valladolid was the seat of a bishop and of the government of the colonial Intendency of Valladolid. It was known as the "Garden of the Viceroyalty of New Spain" because of its prosperity.

Through his paternal line, Morelos was related to Miguel Hidalgo y Costilla. Both insurgents shared a common ancestor, Diego Ruiz de Cortés, who was a descendant of the conquistador Hernán Cortés. Hidalgo was the descendant of Ruiz de Cortés through his mother, Ana María Gallaga.

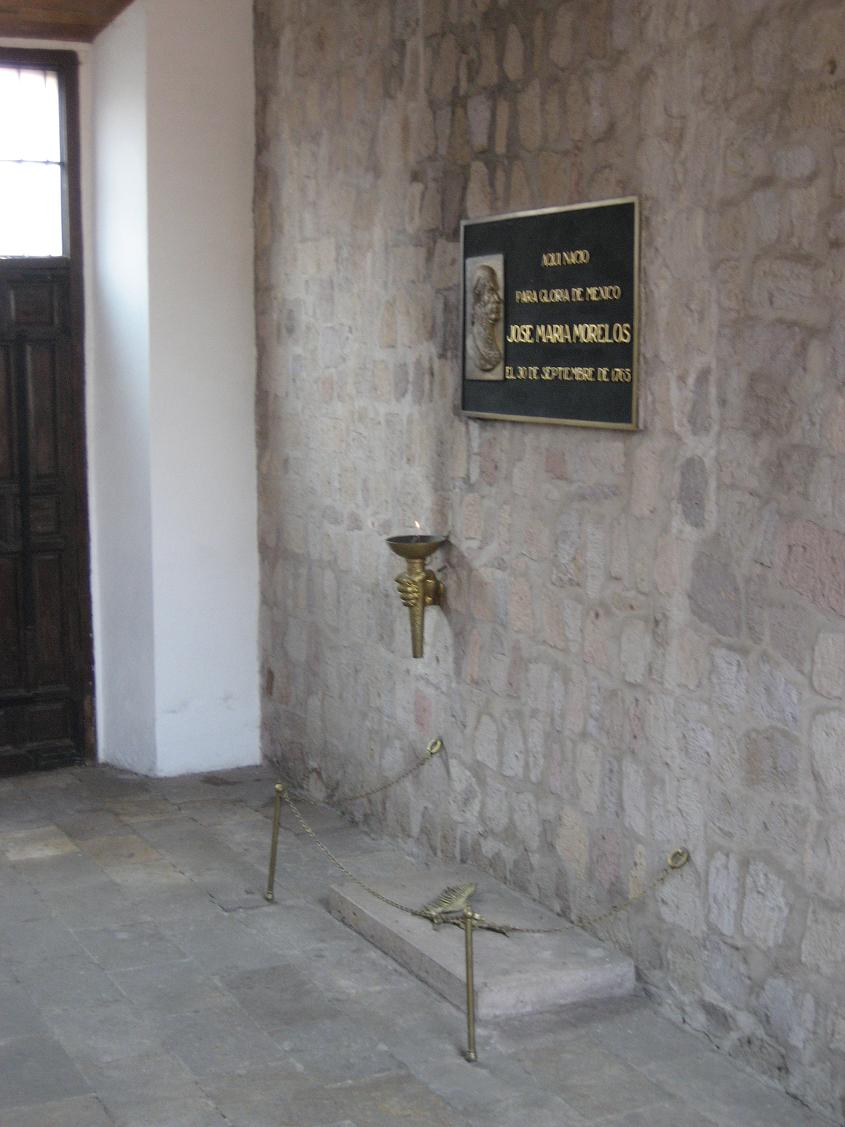
Exact birthplace of José María Morelos.

Morelos worked as a muleteer (arriero) in the area where he fought in the insurgency, on the ground experience of the terrain that would be valuable. He is also said to have worked on a ranch rented by his uncle for nearly ten years.

Morelos had ambitions for something more than working with his hands, and assiduously studied; his maternal grandfather was a school teacher. In 1789, he enrolled in the Colegio de San Nicolás Obispo in Valladolid, where Father Miguel Hidalgo y Costilla was rector. When he was ordained a priest, he, as with many others without connections, had no benefice to guarantee any income as a priest. However, as a secular cleric, he took no vow of poverty and could freely pursue business activities to make a living.

As a priest, he could not marry, but he did form a relationship with at least one woman, Brígida Almonte. He is known to have fathered three children: two sons and a daughter. His first born was Juan Nepomuceno Almonte, who played a significant role in Mexican military history. Lucas Alamán, a fierce nineteenth-century opponent of the insurgency and after independence a conservative politician and historian, asserted that Morelos "fathered various children with anonymous women of the people." This charge of promiscuity might simply be a slur without foundation on the insurgent-priest. At Morelos's trial, the Inquisition accused him of sending his son to the United States. He testified at his trial that "while he had not been completely pristine for a priest, he had not acted in a scandalous manner" and that he had sent his son away for education and for his safety, acknowledging his paternity.

== Insurrection against the Spanish monarchy ==
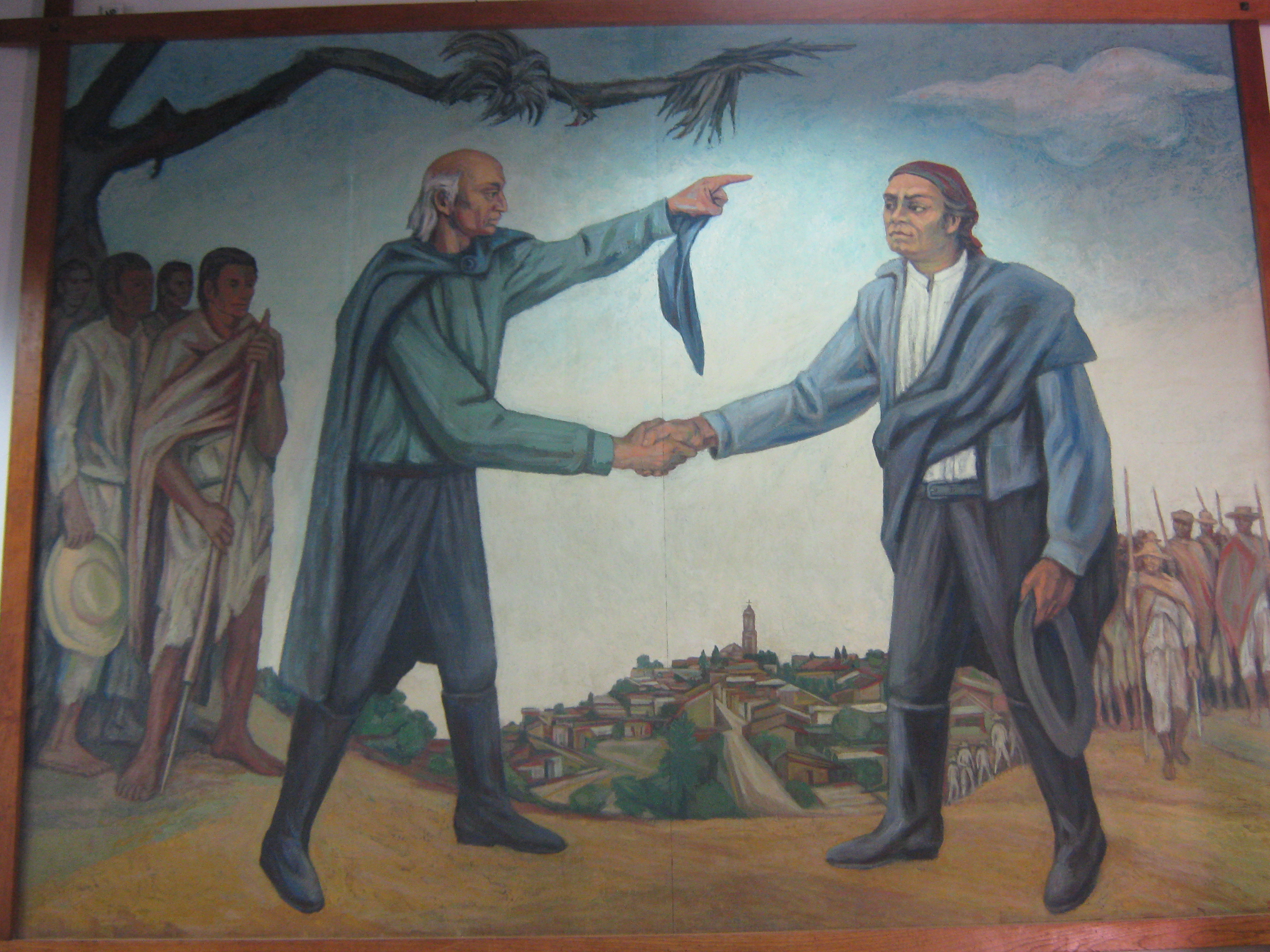
Hidalgo and Morelos, mural in Museo Casa de Morelos

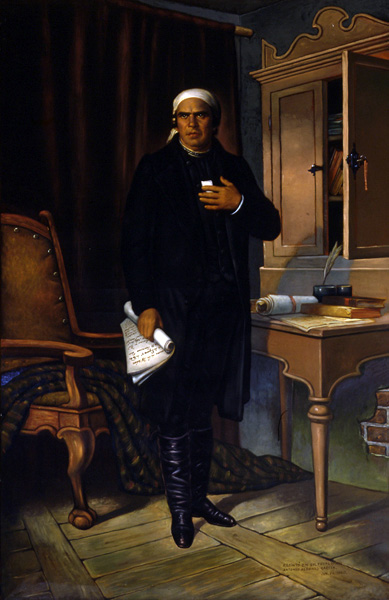
José María Morelos by Petronilo Monroy, 1865.

The former rector of the Colegio de San Nicolás Obispo (where Morelos attended seminary), Miguel Hidalgo y Costilla was planning with others for the independence of New Spain from the Spanish empire. About 6:00 a.m. on 16 September 1810, Hidalgo, then the parish priest of Dolores, Guanajuato (since renamed Dolores Hidalgo in his honor), ordered the church bells to be rung, and gathered his congregation. Flanked by Ignacio Allende and Juan Aldama, Hidalgo addressed the people in front of his church, urging them to take up arms, with the Cry of Dolores (El Grito de Dolores, now celebrated every year on 15 September at 11:00 p.m.) that called for armed revolt after the Spanish colonial authorities had discovered the Conspiracy of Querétaro, a clandestine movement seeking Mexican independence. Like Allende and Aldama, Josefa Ortiz de Domínguez, popularly known as La Corregidora, was one of the famous initial supporters of the revolt. Miguel Hidalgo and his followers rose in open rebellion against the Spanish colonial authorities launching what became the Mexican War of Independence.

With the imperial government taken by surprise, operatives took important cities of the Bajío region without an organized response. The insurgency proclaimed Hidalgo captain general of Mexico in Celaya on 21 September. Hidalgo y Costilla advanced to Guanajuato; and on 28 September, the rebels captured the Alhóndiga de Granaditas in battle, killing at least 400 Spaniards who had taken shelter. Among the dead was the crown's highest official in Guanajuato, Intendant Juan Antonio Riaño, an old friend of Hidalgo y Costilla.

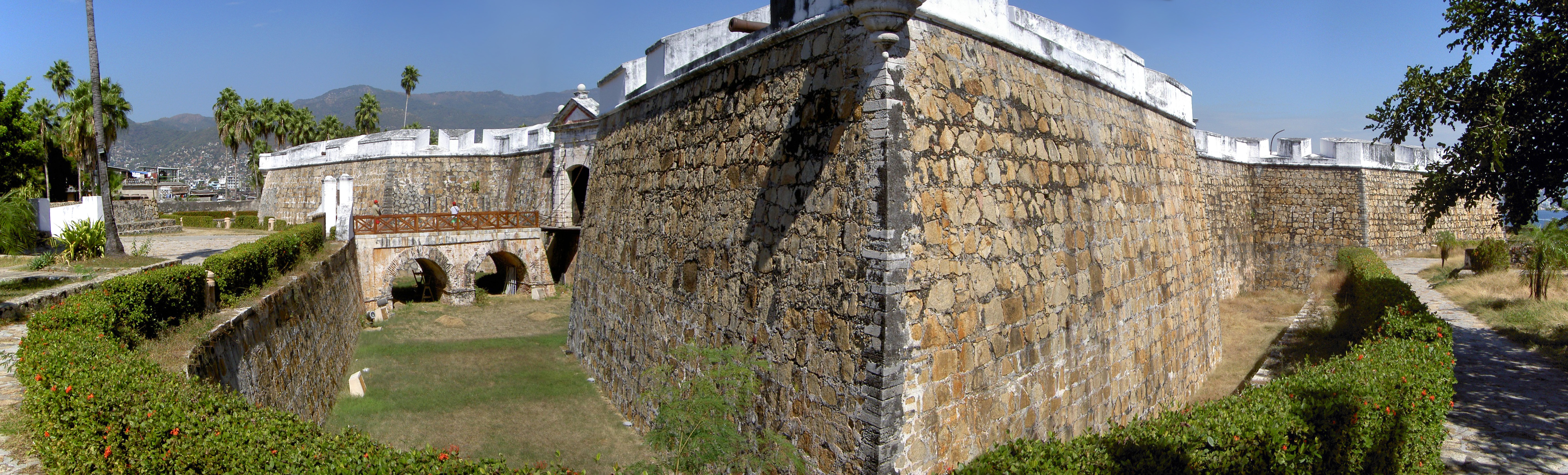
The Fort of San Diego in Acapulco, Guerrero, Mexico. It was originally built between 1615 and 1617, but an earthquake destroyed it in 1776. It was rebuilt in 1783.

The bishop of Michoacán, Manuel Abad y Queipo, excommunicated the insurgents. Hidalgo y Costilla and his army marched on to Valladolid, where the locals feared that the slaughter of Guanajuato would be repeated, prompting many people to abandon the region, particularly elites. Valladolid was taken peacefully on 17 October 1810.

In Tacámbaro, Hidalgo y Costilla was proclaimed general, and Allende captain general. Hidalgo ordered a rest for his troops in Indaparapeo, where a few minutes before their departure, Morelos, who had read about his excommunication and his triumphs, found him. Morelos had heard of the revolt in October 1810 and determined to join it. Hidalgo asked his former student to recruit troops in the south of the colony and capture the port of Acapulco, the west coast port for the Pacific trade to the Philippines, also a Spanish colony. Unlike Hidalgo, who was a poor tactician leading a huge and undisciplined following, Morelos quickly demonstrated military skills, gathering and training a small core of fighters. He sought allies in the region, and obtained cannons and other war materiel.

Morelos's objectives for the rebellion called for the creation of a republican government that "all Mexican people would participate, the abolition of slavery, and the elimination of divisions between races and ethnicities."

=== Campaigns ===
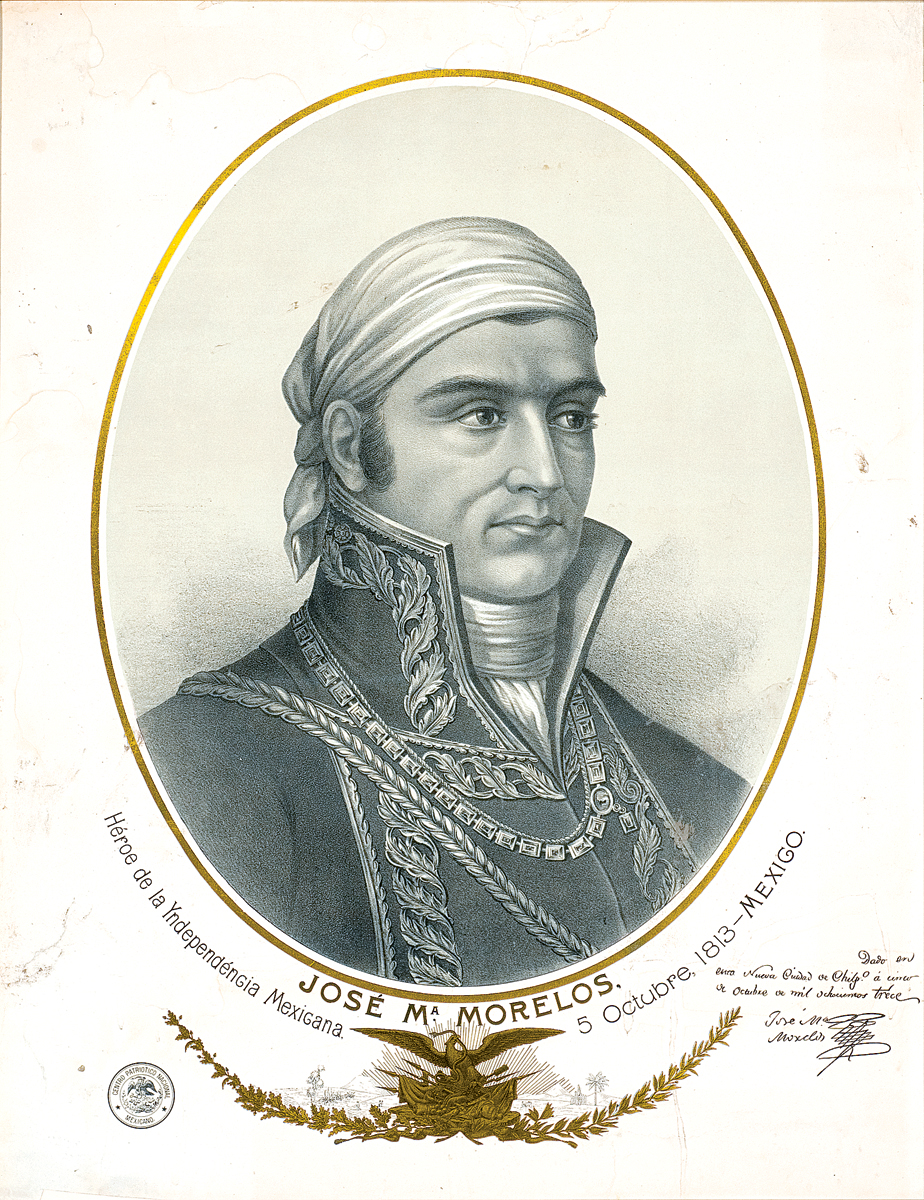
Self-portrait of Morelos in 1813

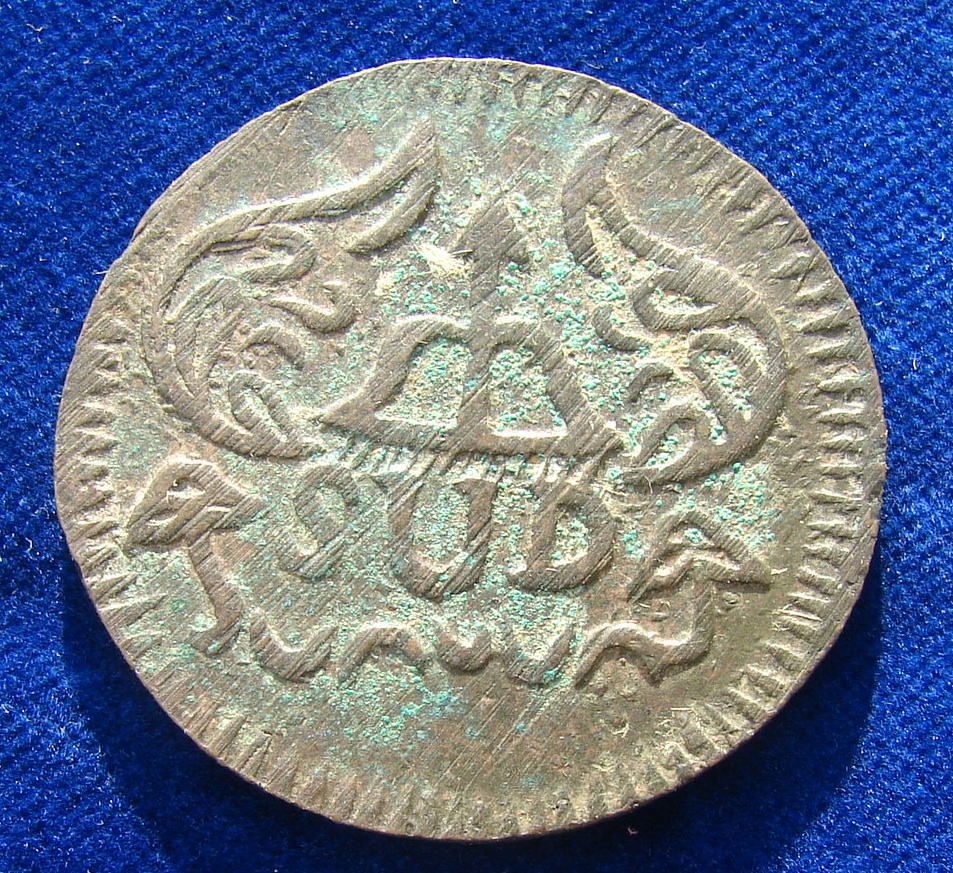
Insurgent coinage: Mexico, Oaxaca, 8 Reales 1814, obverse.

Morelos soon showed himself to be a talented strategist, and became one of the greatest revolutionary military commanders of the war. In his first nine months, he won 22 victories, defeating the armies of three Spanish royalist leaders and capturing almost all of what is now the state of Guerrero. In December, he captured Acapulco for the first time, except for the Fort of San Diego. Spanish reinforcements forced him to raise the siege in January. By quick marches, he was able to capture most of the Spanish possessions on the Pacific coast of what are now Michoacán and Guerrero. On 24 May 1811, he occupied Chilpancingo and on 26 May he took Tixtla.

In his second campaign, Morelos divided his army into three groups. The most important engagement of this campaign was at Cuautla. On Christmas Eve 1811 the townspeople welcomed Morelos to the town. The next year his forces were besieged by the Spanish army under general Félix María Calleja del Rey. On 2 May 1812, after 58 days, Morelos broke through the siege, and started his third campaign.

Major victories on this third campaign were at Citlalli on 8 June 1812, Tehuacán on 10 August 1812, Orizaba, Oaxaca and Acapulco. Morelos arrived at Orizaba with 10,000 soldiers on 28 October 1812. The city was defended by 600 Spanish soldiers. Negotiation led to a surrender without bloodshed. He entered Oaxaca in triumph on 25 November 1812. Acapulco fell on 12 April 1813, forcing the Spanish army to take refuge in the Fort of San Diego.

=== Congress of Chilpancingo ===
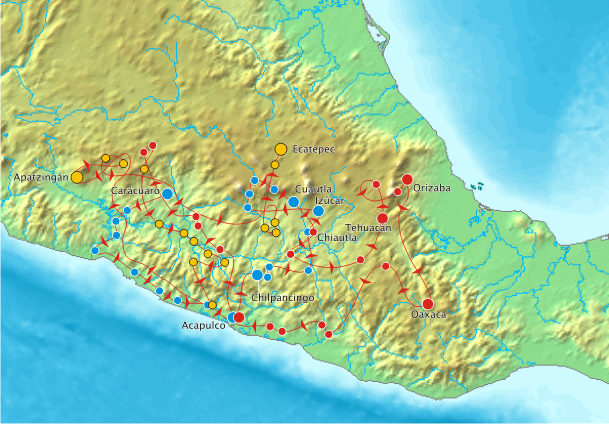
A map of the military campaigns of Morelos.

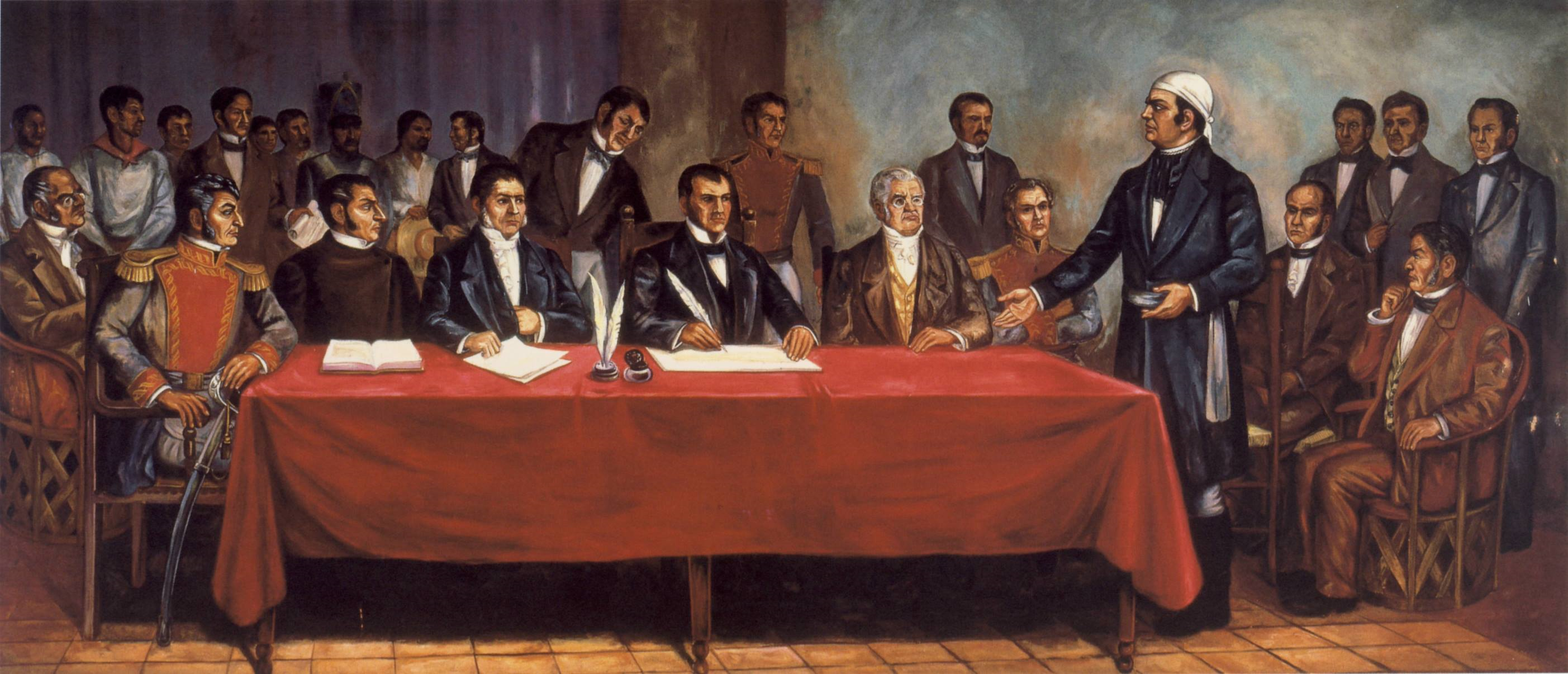
Congress of Anahuac the day of the writing of Solemn Act of the Declaration of Independence of Northern America

In 1813, Morelos called the National Constituent Congress of Chilpancingo, composed of representatives of the provinces under his control, to consider a political and social program which he outlined in a document entitled Sentimientos de la Nación (Sentiments of the Nation). The Congress called itself the Congress of Anáhuac, in reference to the Aztecs.

On 31 September 1813, the Congress, with Morelos present, endorsed Sentiments of the Nation. This document declared Mexican independence from Spain, established Catholicism as official religion and created the legislative, executive and judicial branches of government. It declared respect for property and confiscated the productions of the Spanish colonial government. It abolished slavery and racial categories in favor of the title "American" for all native-born individuals. Torture, colonial monopolies and the system of tributes were also abolished. Morelos was offered the title "Generalissimo" with the style of address "Your Highness", but he refused these and asked to be called "Siervo de la Nación" (Servant of the Nation). On 6 November 1813, the Congress declared independence in the Solemn Act of the Declaration of Independence of Northern America.

After several military defeats, the Congress organized a meeting in Apatzingán, and on 22 October promulgated the "Decreto Constitucional para la Libertad de la América Mexicana" (Constitution of Apatzingán). This established a limited executive and a powerful legislature, the opposite of what Morelos had called for. He nevertheless conceded that it was the best he could hope for under the circumstances.

=== Capture and execution ===
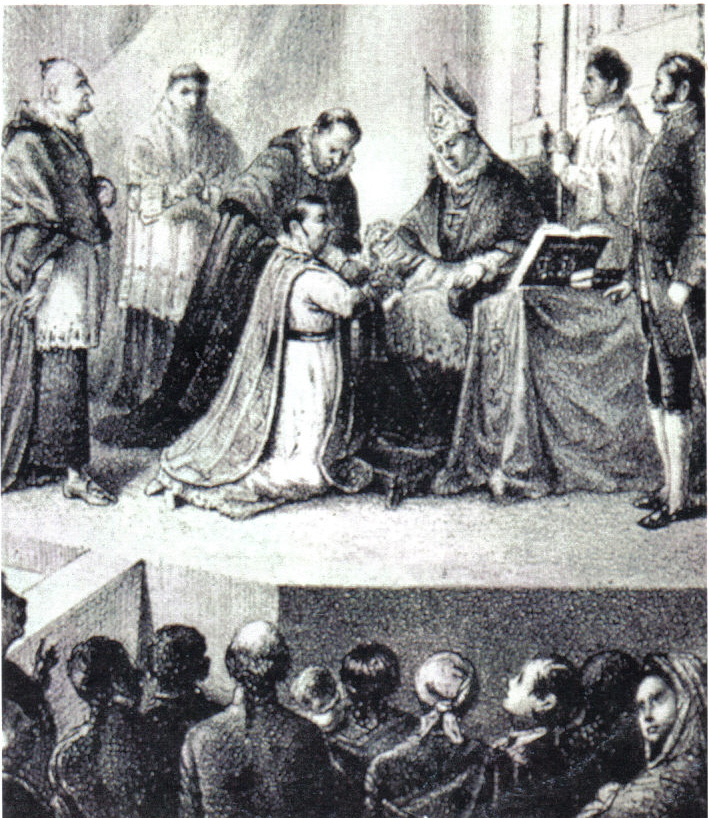
Contemporary engraving depicting the defrocking and degradation of Morelos by church officials before released to civil authorities for execution

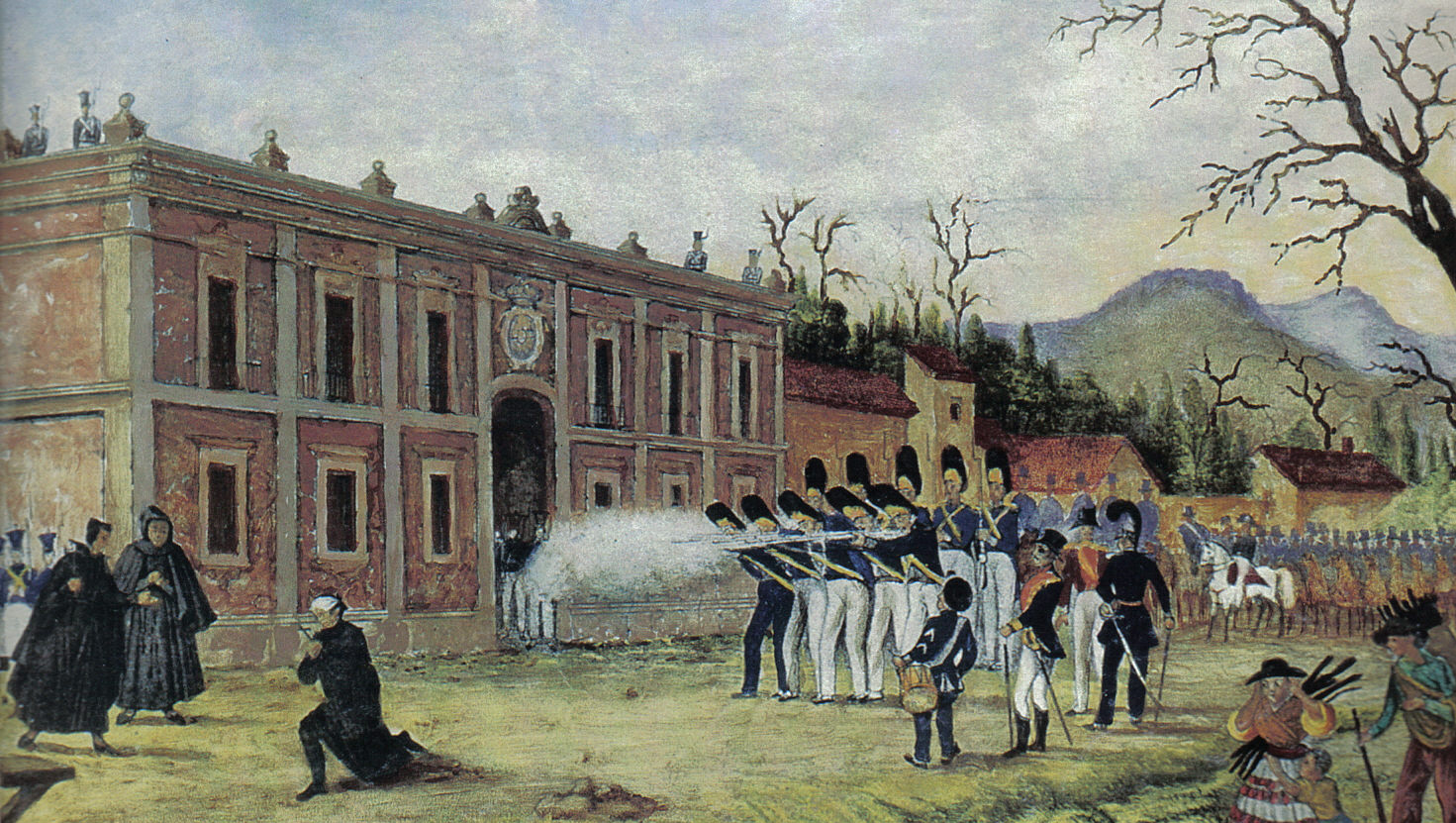
Execution of Morelos

Shortly thereafter, Morelos began his fourth military campaign, a series of defeats beginning at Valladolid in late 1813. While escorting the new insurgent Congress in November 1815, he was defeated in Temalaca by royalist forces. Morelos and his guard were surrounded; rather than have all taken prisoner, Morelos told his men to each save himself. This left Morelos to be captured alone. As a Catholic priest, the church had jurisdiction for his imprisonment and trial; he was jailed in the Inquisition building in Mexico City. Although Morelos was a huge prize for the royal government, the viceroy decided not to make a public spectacle of his journey of incarceration, but rather slipped him into the capital before dawn.

The royal government had experience with the trial and execution of Father Miguel Hidalgo y Costilla, which was done far from the capital and in rushed fashion; but Morelos's trial was conducted in the capital with the highest officials presiding, with the outcome of a guilty verdict and execution by civil officials. Inquisition officials drew up 23 charges against Morelos, and following proper procedure, Morelos had a defense attorney, José Quiles. He was charged with treason, disloyalty to the crown, and transgressions in his personal life, namely, sending his natural sons to the United States for education.

He was tried and sentenced to death for treason. Morelos was executed by firing squad on 22 December 1815, in San Cristóbal Ecatepec, north of Mexico City in order that his execution not provoke a dangerous public reaction. He was later judged to be reconciled to the church, lifting his excommunication, as he was seen praying on his way to his execution. After his death, his lieutenant, Vicente Guerrero, continued the war for independence.

== Legacy ==
Morelos is considered a national hero of Mexico; the state of Morelos and city of Morelia are named after him. Morelos has been portrayed on the 50-peso note since 1997, and on 1-peso coins during the 1940s, 1970s and 1980s. The Estadio Morelos in Morelia, Puerto Morelos in the state of Quintana Roo, the Morelos Station on the Mexico City Metro, the city of Ecatepec de Morelos in Mexico State where he was executed, Insurgente José María Morelos y Pavón National Park in Michoacán, and the Morelos Satellite from the Communications company Satmex are also named after him. His remains were transferred to the Monument to Independence El Ángel in Mexico City, along with those of other heroes of the insurgency. The Presidential aircraft Boeing 787 TP-01 was named José María Morelos y Pavón.

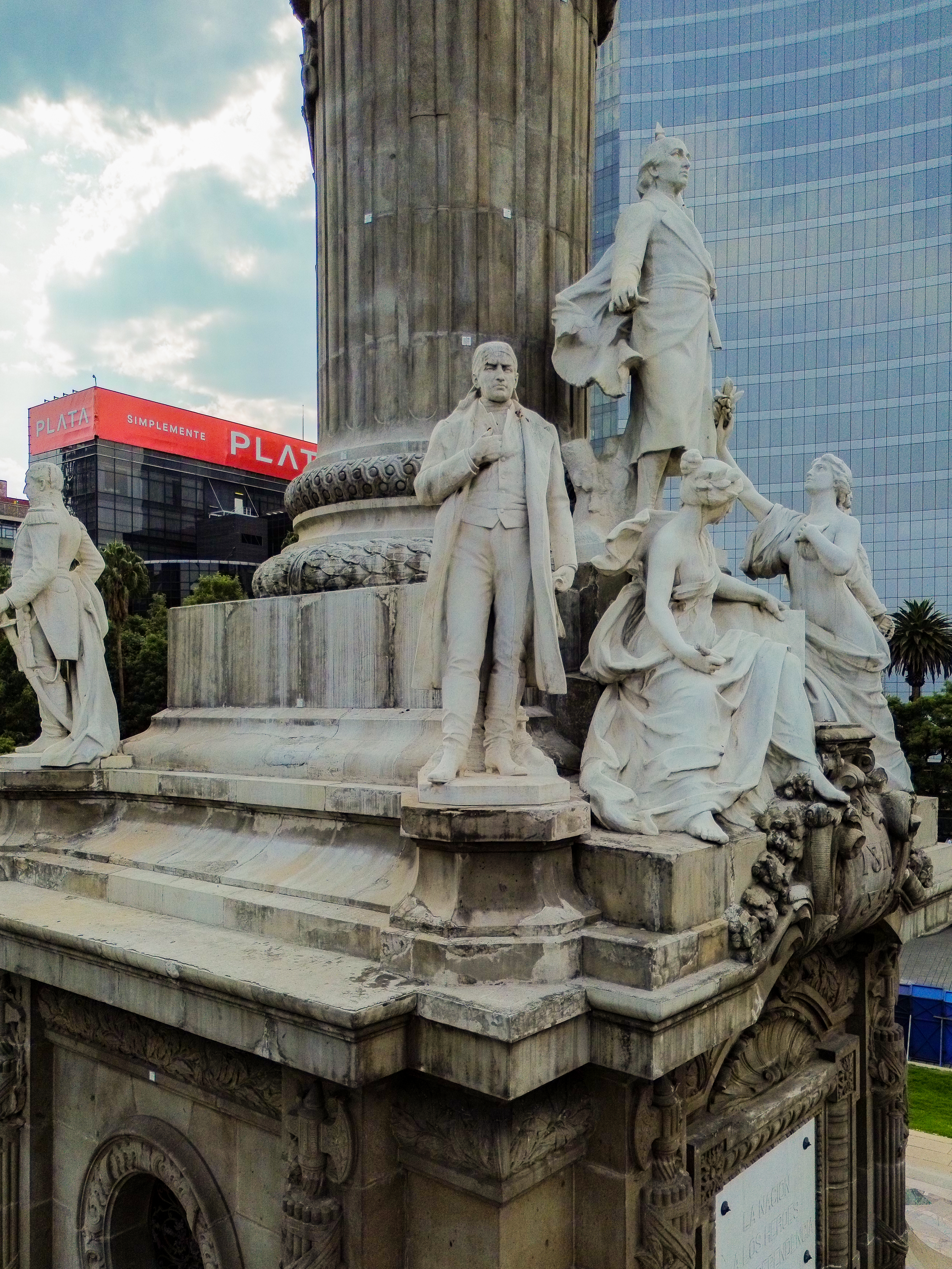
Sculpture of Morelos at the Angel of Independence in Mexico City, where his remains are entombed in the mausoleum at its base.

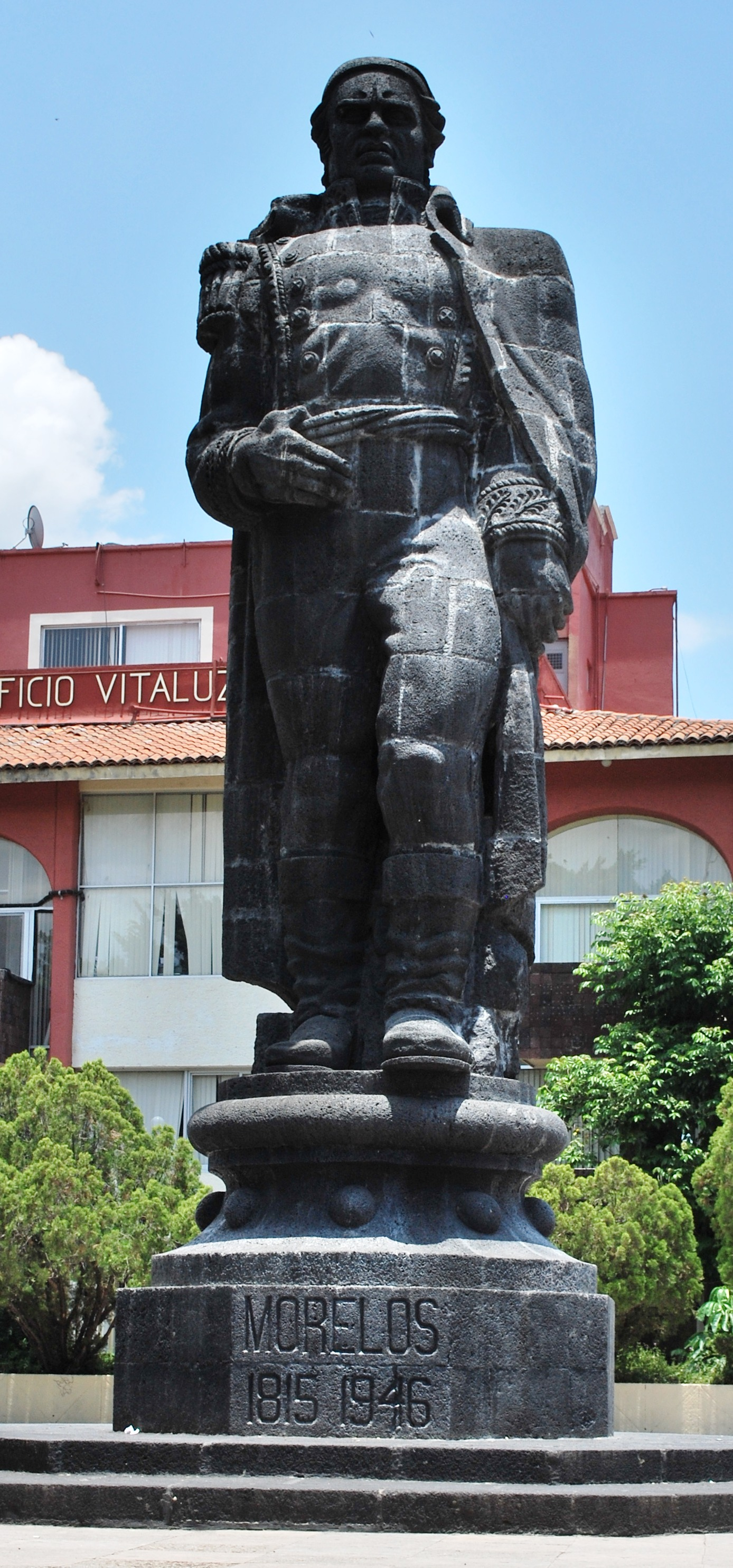
Statue of Morelos in Parque Morelos, central Cuernavaca, Morelos

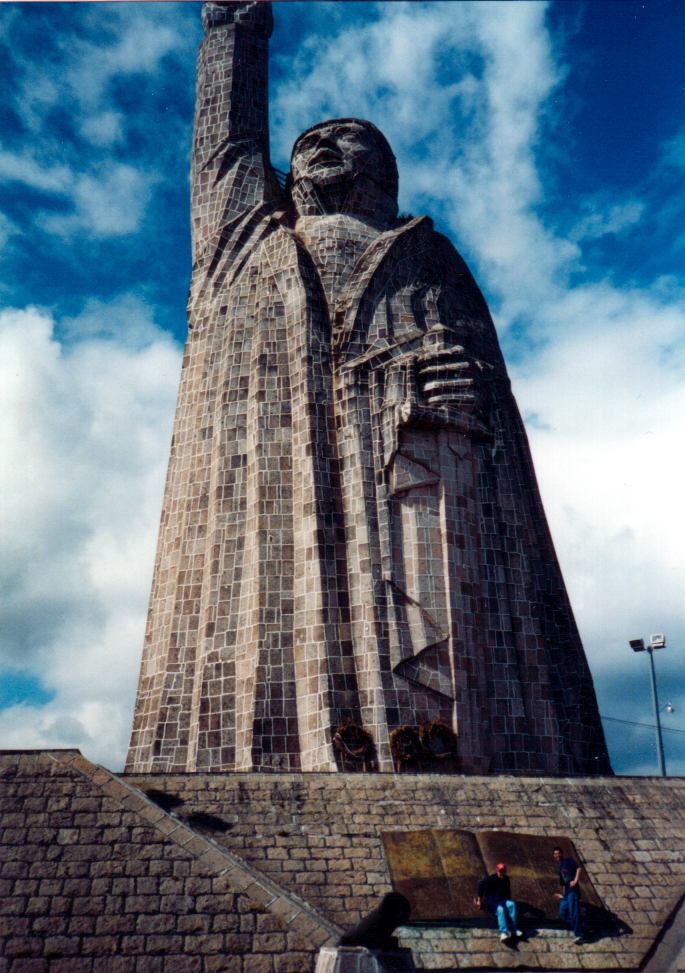
Statue at Janitzio, Michoacán

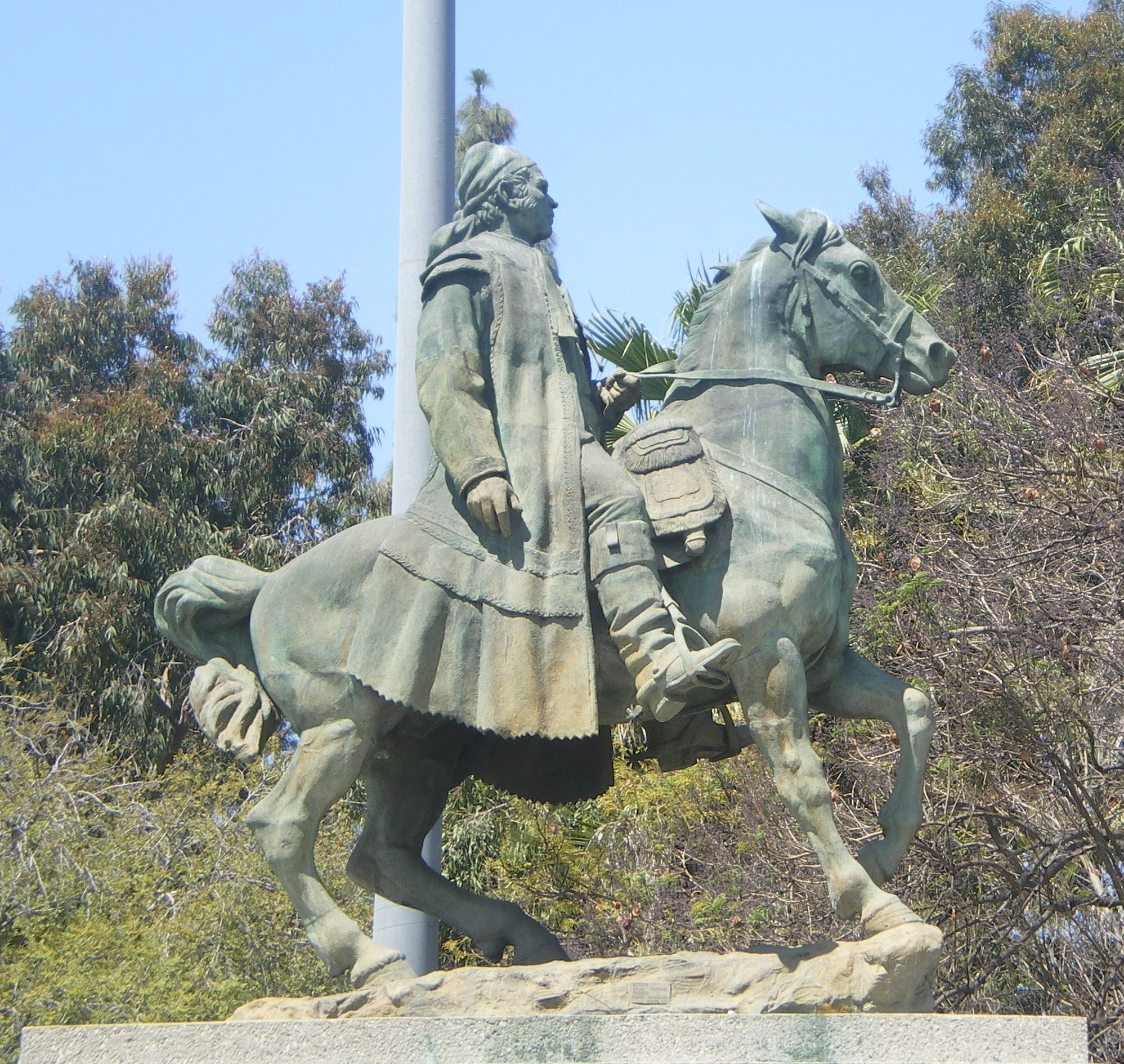
Equestrian statue of José María Morelos, Los Angeles

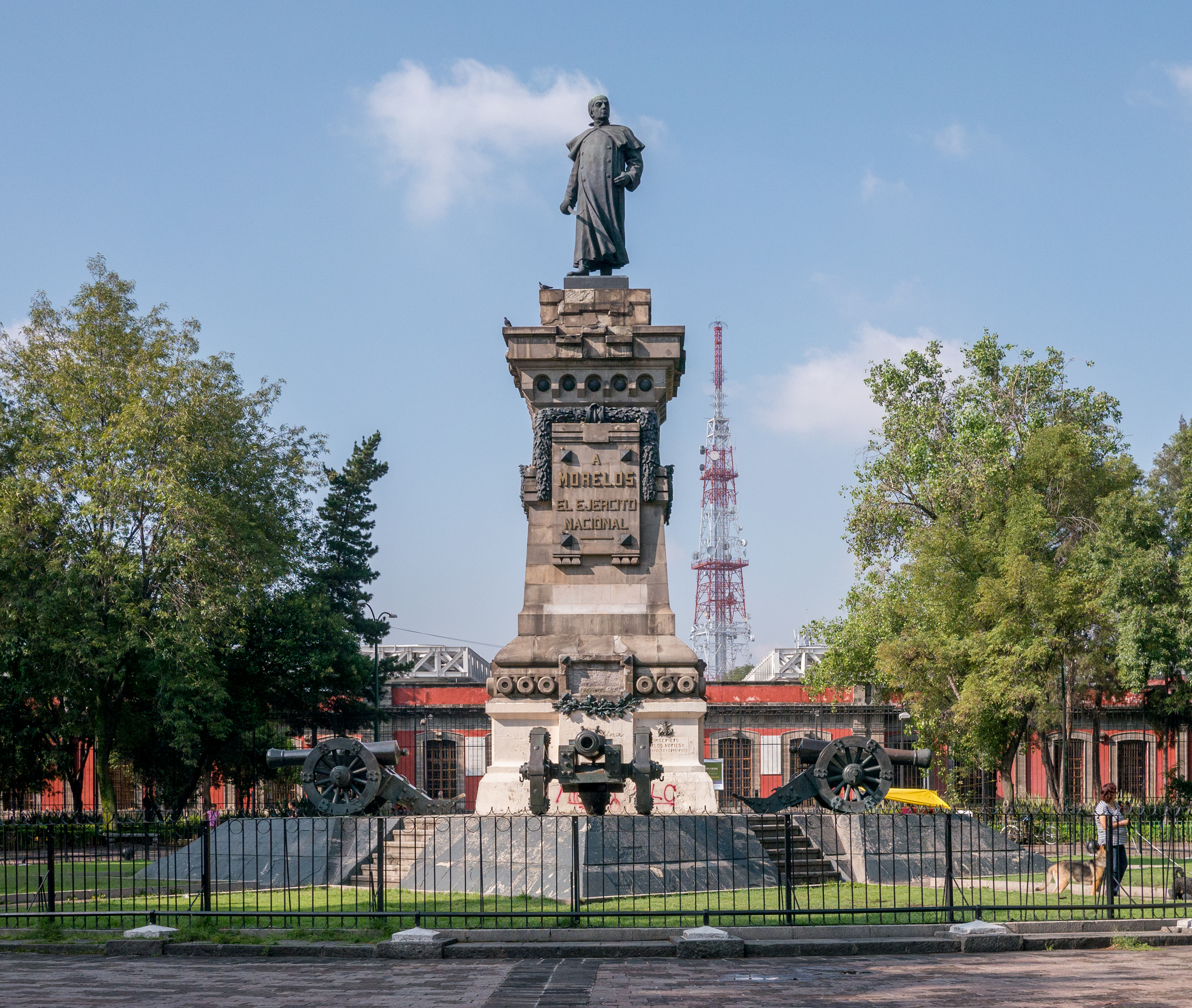
Citadel Square; José María Morelos

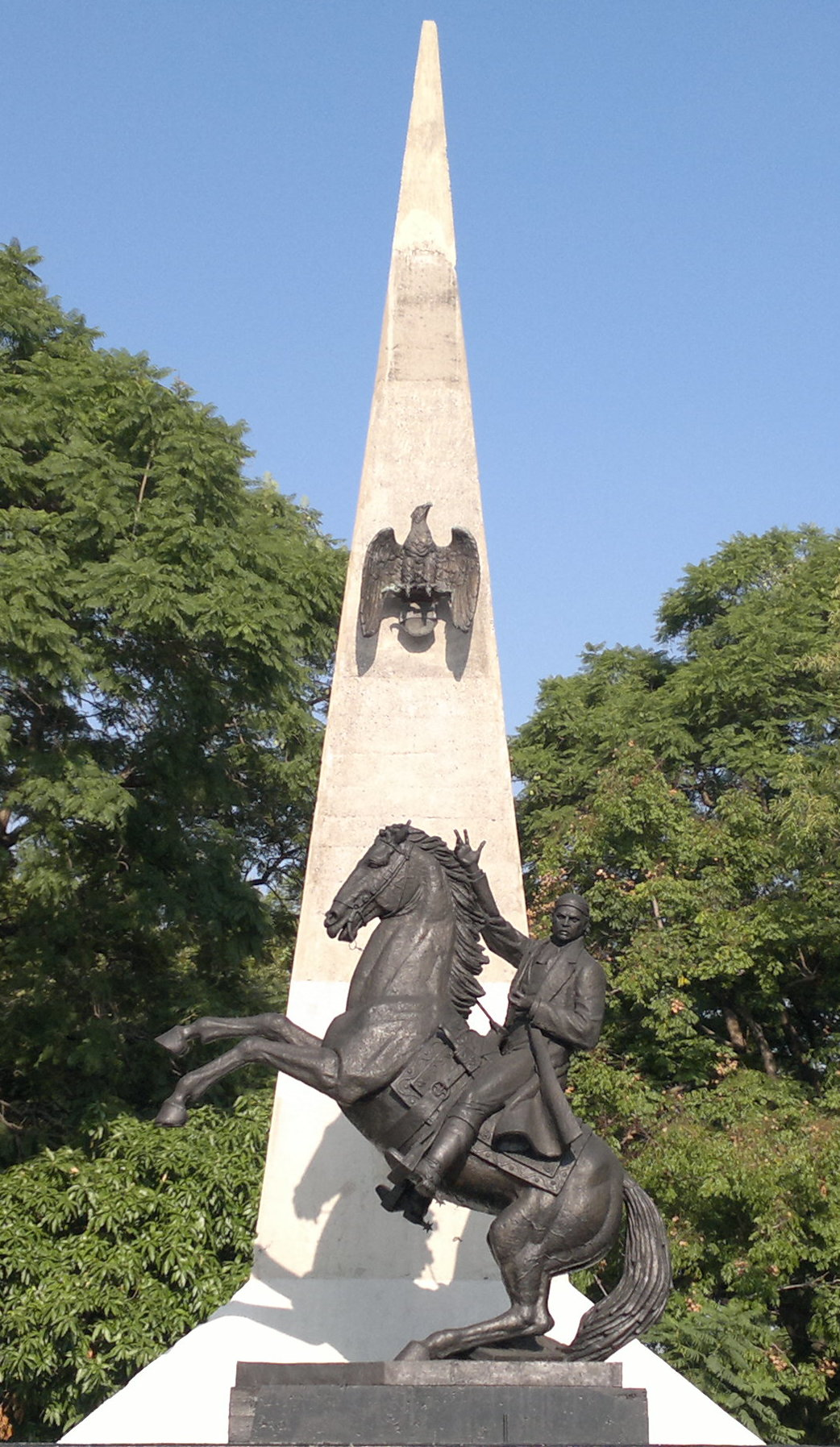
Equestrian statue of José María Morelos, Guadalajara

== See also ==
- Equestrian statue of José María Morelos, Guadalajara, Jalisco, Mexico
- List of people from Morelos
- Reward offered for Morelos y Pavón's head
