= Equestrian statue of José María Morelos (Guadalajara) =

Equestrian statue in Guadalajara, Jalisco, Mexico

- Monumento a Morelos (Spanish)
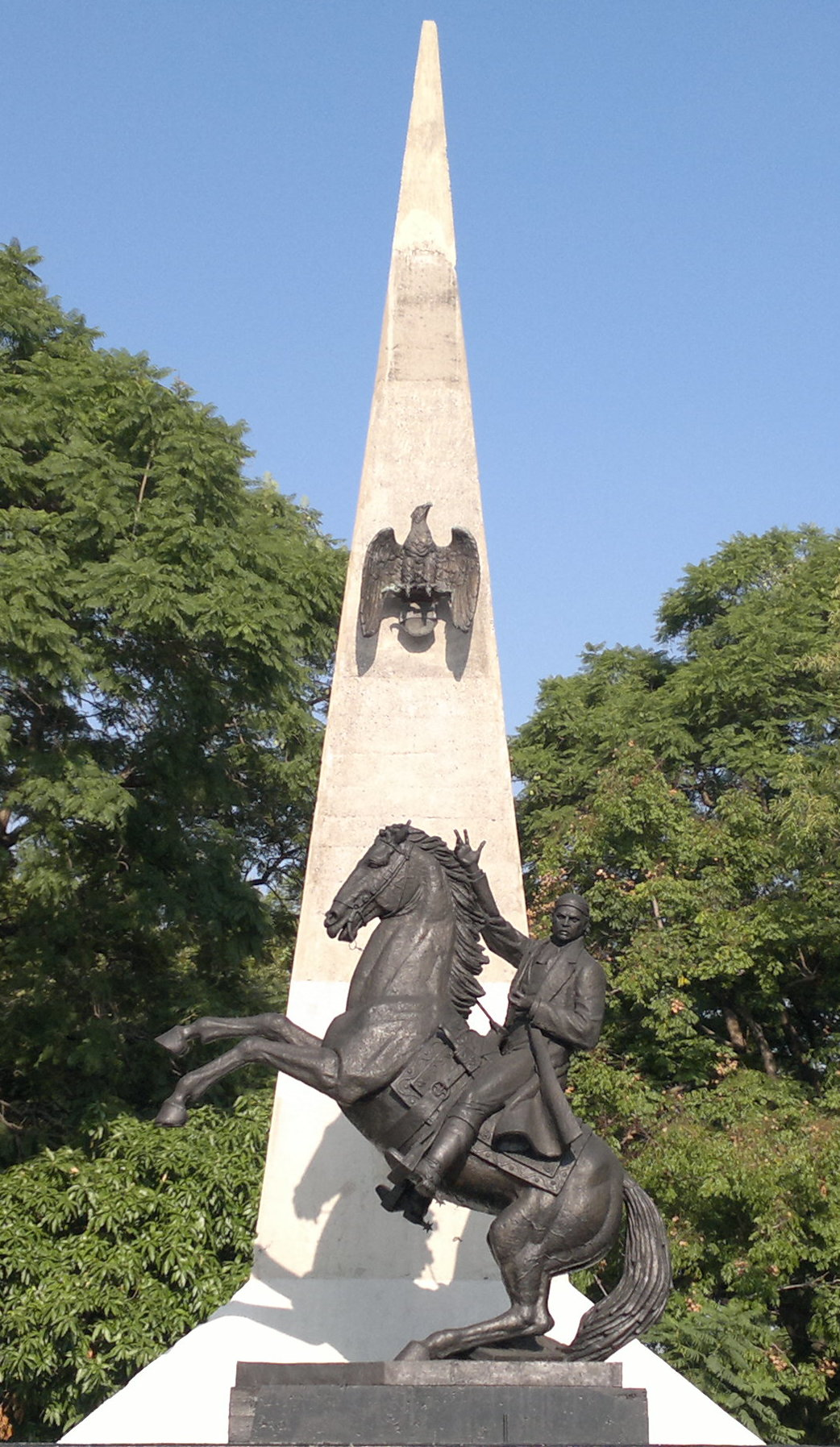
- The statue in 2011
- Artist: Miguel Miramontes
- Year: 1965
- Medium: Bronze sculpture
- Subject: José María Morelos
- Location: Guadalajara, Jalisco, Mexico; 20°40′49.7″N 103°20′22″W

An equestrian statue of José María Morelos, officially named Monumento a Morelos, is installed in Guadalajara, in the Mexican state of Jalisco. It was designed by Miguel Miramontes and it was unveiled in September 1965. It is installed along Parque Morelos, previously named Paseo de la Alameda. The bronze statue is placed in front of a quarry obelisk. Above the main statue, there is a bronze eagle that represents one of the former coats of arms of the country.

== See also ==
- 1965 in art
- List of equestrian statues
