= List of statues on Paseo de la Reforma =

List of statues on Mexico City's Paseo de la Reforma

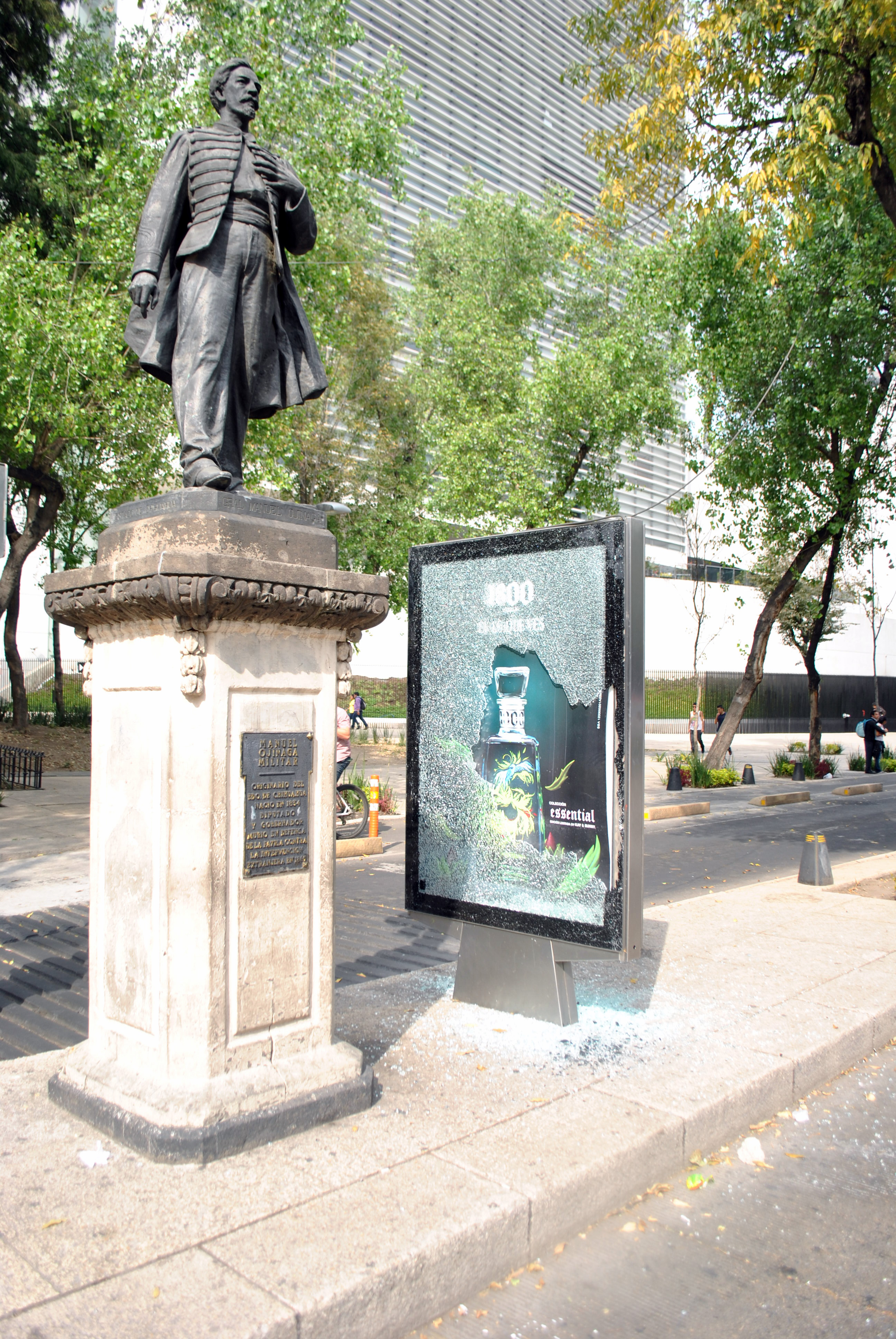
Statue of Manuel Ojinaga in 2012

There are many statues installed along Paseo de la Reforma, in Mexico City, Mexico. Major monuments include the Angel of Independence, the Diana the Huntress Fountain, the Monument to Christopher Columbus, and the Monument to Cuauhtémoc. Other sculptures include El Ángel de la Seguridad Social, El Caballito, How Doth the Little Crocodile, and Puerta 1808, and formerly the statue of Heydar Aliyev.

== List of statues ==
=== Statues from Puerta de los Leones, Chapultepec to the Angel of Independence ===
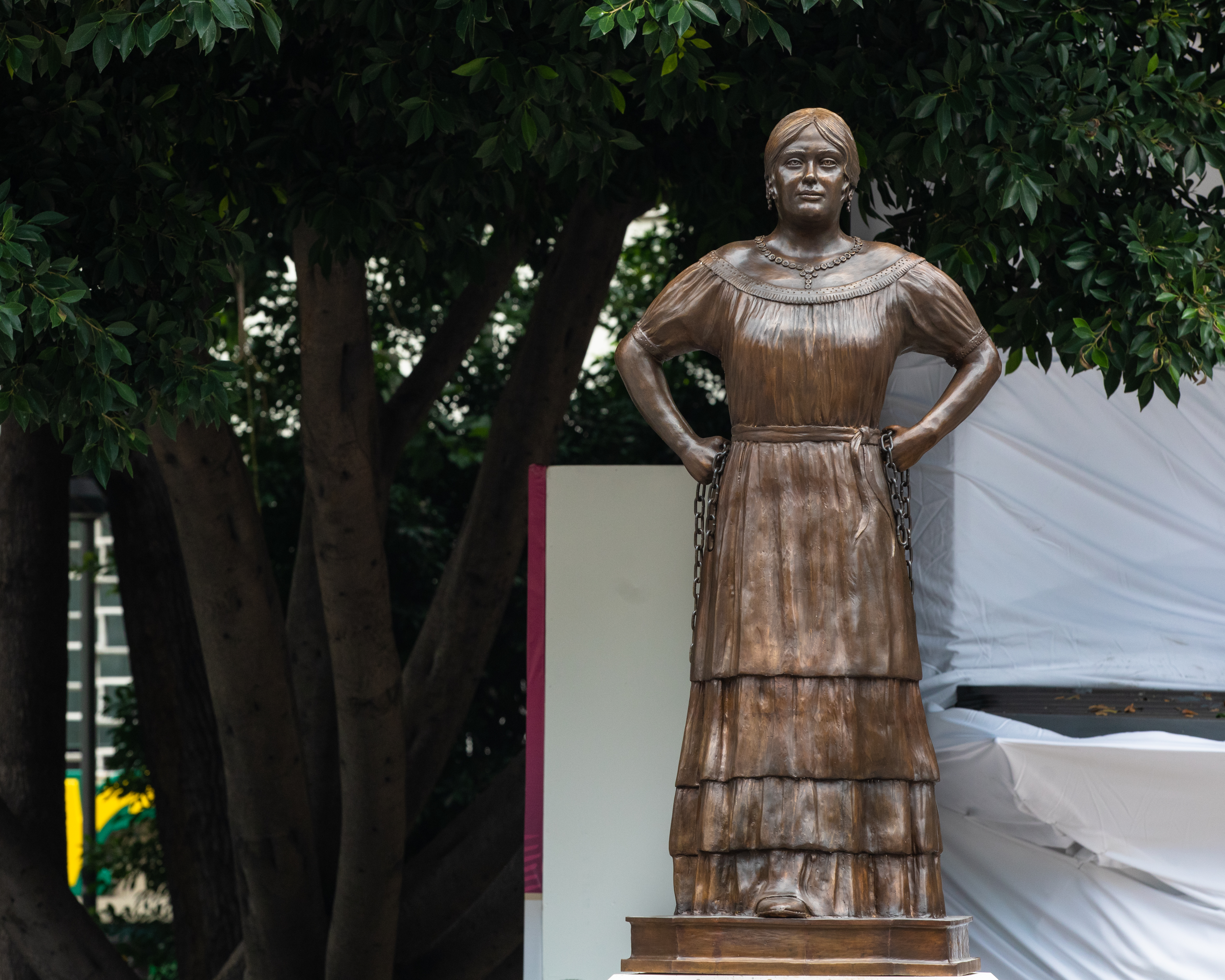
Statue of Leona Vicario

In late 2021, 14 statues of women were installed in a section named Paseo de las Heroínas (Heroines Boulevard). The subjects are:

- Josefa Ortiz de Domínguez
- Leona Vicario
- Gertrudis Bocanegra
- Forjadoras Anónimas de la Nación (anonymous female shapers of the nation)
- Juana Inés de la Cruz
- Margarita Maza
- Dolores Jiménez y Muro
- Matilde Montoya
- Carmen Serdán
- Juana Belén Gutiérrez
- Agustina Ramírez
- Elvia Carrillo Puerto
- Hermila Galindo
- Sara Pérez Romero

=== Statues from the Angel of Independence to El Caballito ===
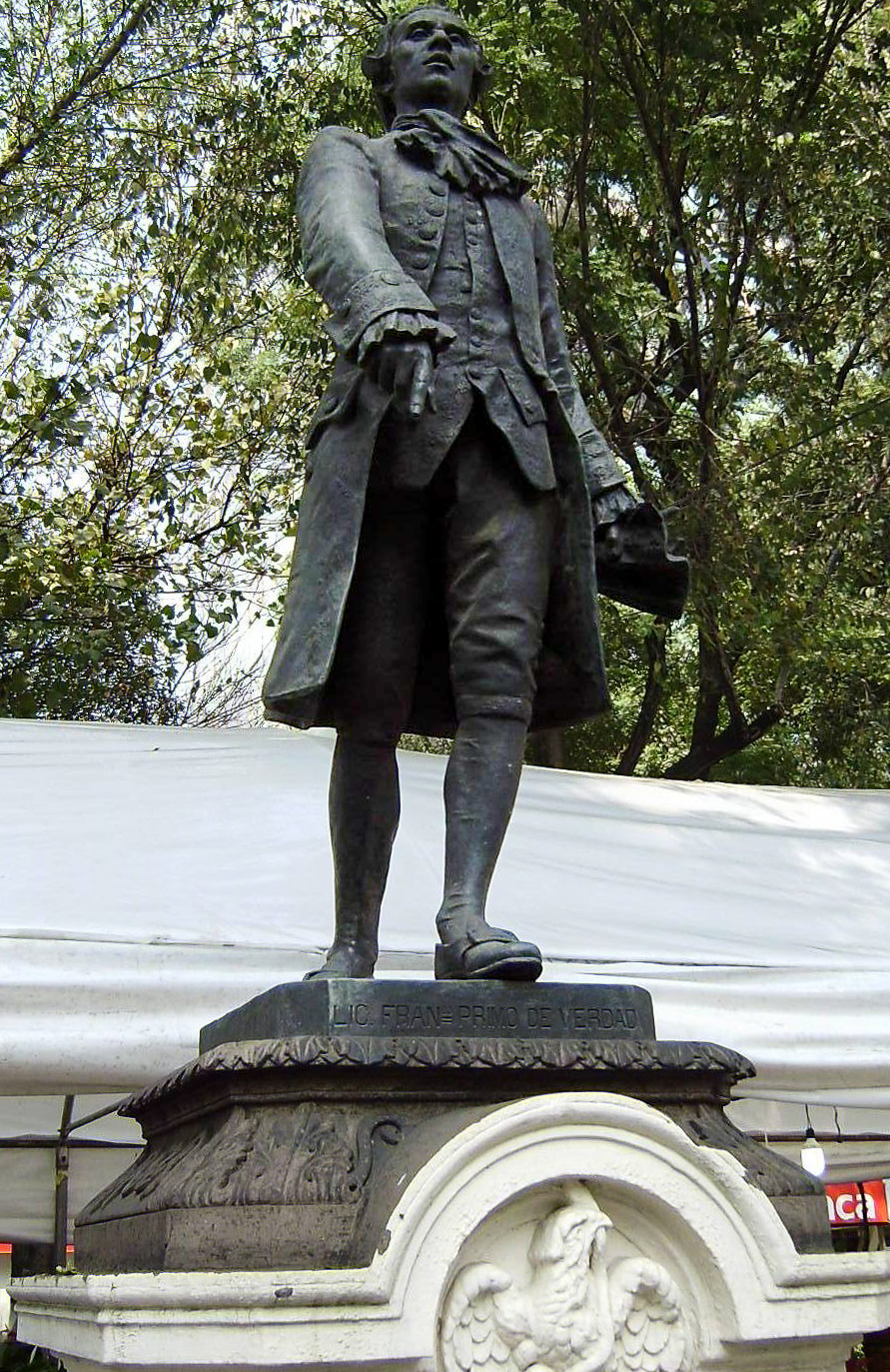
Statue of Francisco Primo de Verdad y Ramos, 2009

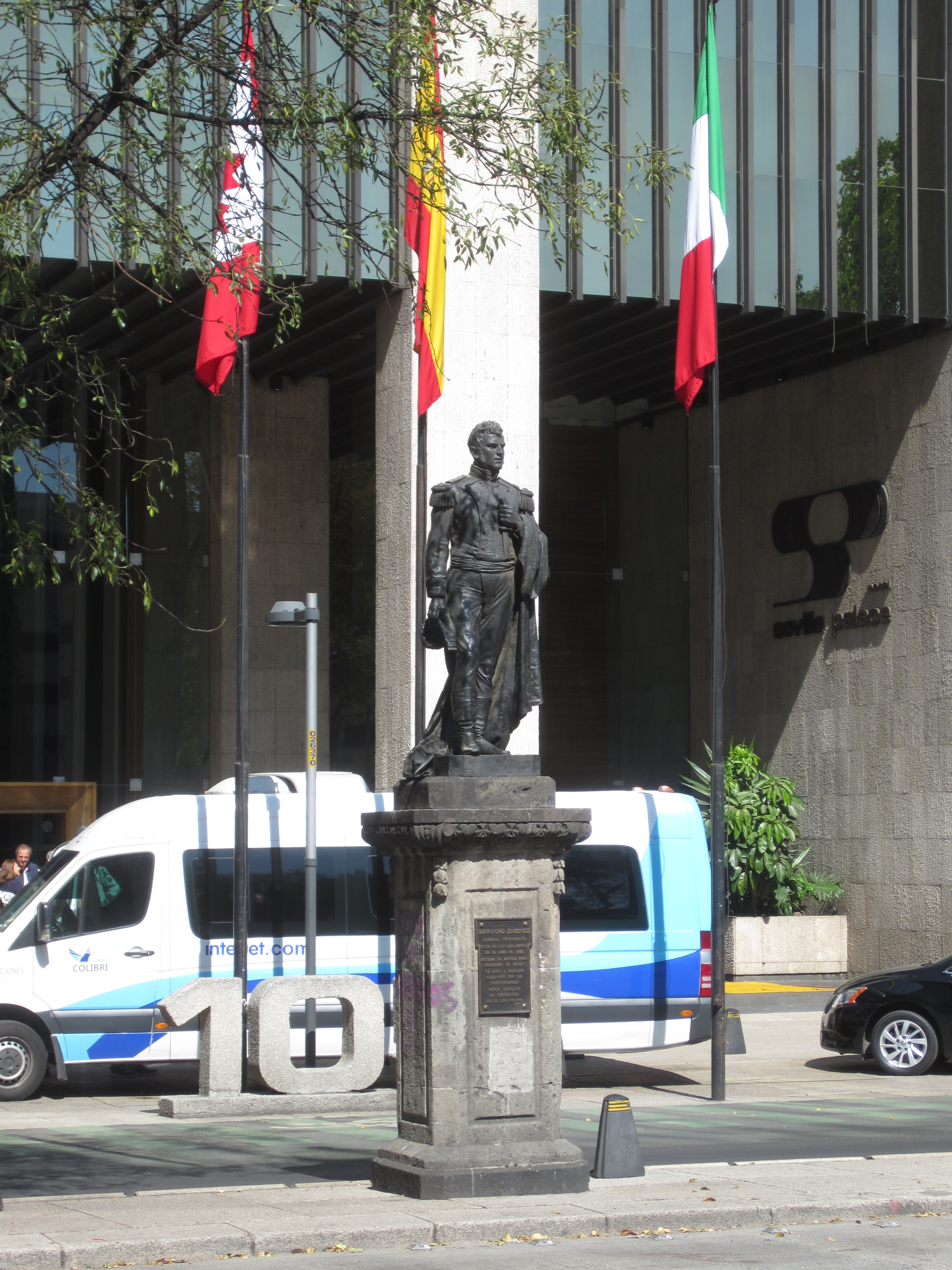
Statue of José Mariano Jiménez, 2018

38 statues have been installed between the Angel of Independence and El Caballito, depicting the following individuals:

1. Ignacio Ramírez
2. Leandro Valle Martínez
3. Rafael Lucio Nájera
4. Miguel Lerdo de Tejada
5. Manuel Cepeda Peraza
6. Andrés Quintana Roo
7. Nicolás García de San Vicente
8. Julián Villagrán
9. Ignacio Pesqueira
10. Jesús García Morales
11. Juan Zuazua
12. Servando Teresa de Mier
13. Carlos María de Bustamante
14. Antonio León
15. José Mariano Jiménez
16. Ponciano Arriaga
17. Donato Guerra
18. Manuel López Cotilla
19. Guadalupe Victoria
20. Francisco Zarco
21. Plutarco González, installed in 2006?
22. León Guzmán, installed in 2006?
23. Manuel Ojinaga
24. Esteban Coronado
25. José Eduardo de Cárdenas
26. Gregorio Méndez Magaña
27. Francisco Primo de Verdad y Ramos
28. José María Chávez Alonso
29. Hermenegildo Galeana
30. Leonardo Bravo
31. Ramón Corona
32. Antonio Rosales
33. Ignacio López Rayón
34. Francisco Manuel Sánchez de Tagle
35. Pedro José Méndez
36. Juan José de la Garza
37. Juan Antonio de la Fuente, removed/relocated?
38. Miguel Ramos Arizpe, removed/relocated?

=== Statues from El Caballito to Peravillo ===
There are 39 additional statues installed between El Caballito and Peravillo:

1. José María Luis Mora
2. Jesús Terán Peredo
3. Juan Álvarez
4. Ángel Albino Corzo
5. Guillermo Prieto
6. Gabino Barreda
7. Mariano Escobedo
8. Eustaquio Buelna Pérez
9. Manuel Gutiérrez Zamora
10. Sóstenes Rocha
11. Joaquín Miguel Gutiérrez
12. José María Lafragua
13. Manuel Doblado
14. Cecilio Chi
15. Jacinto Pat
16. Eulogio Parra
17. Bibiano Dávalos López
18. Clodomiro Cota Márquez
19. Manuel Márquez de León
20. Gregorio Torres Quintero
21. Manuel Álvarez Zamora
22. José María Arteaga
23. Ezequiel Montes Ledesma
24. Antonio Carvajal
25. Miguel Lira y Ortega
26. Pablo García Montilla
27. Francisco Sosa Escalante
28. Jesús González Ortega
29. Francisco García Salinas
30. Vicente Riva Palacio
31. Manuel Payno
32. José María Iglesias
33. Ignacio Mejía
34. Francisco Leyva Arciniega
35. José Diego Fernández Torres
36. Santos Degollado
37. Melchor Ocampo
38. Ignacio Manuel Altamirano
39. Erasmo Castellanos Quinto
