= José Manuel de Herrera =

Mexican politician

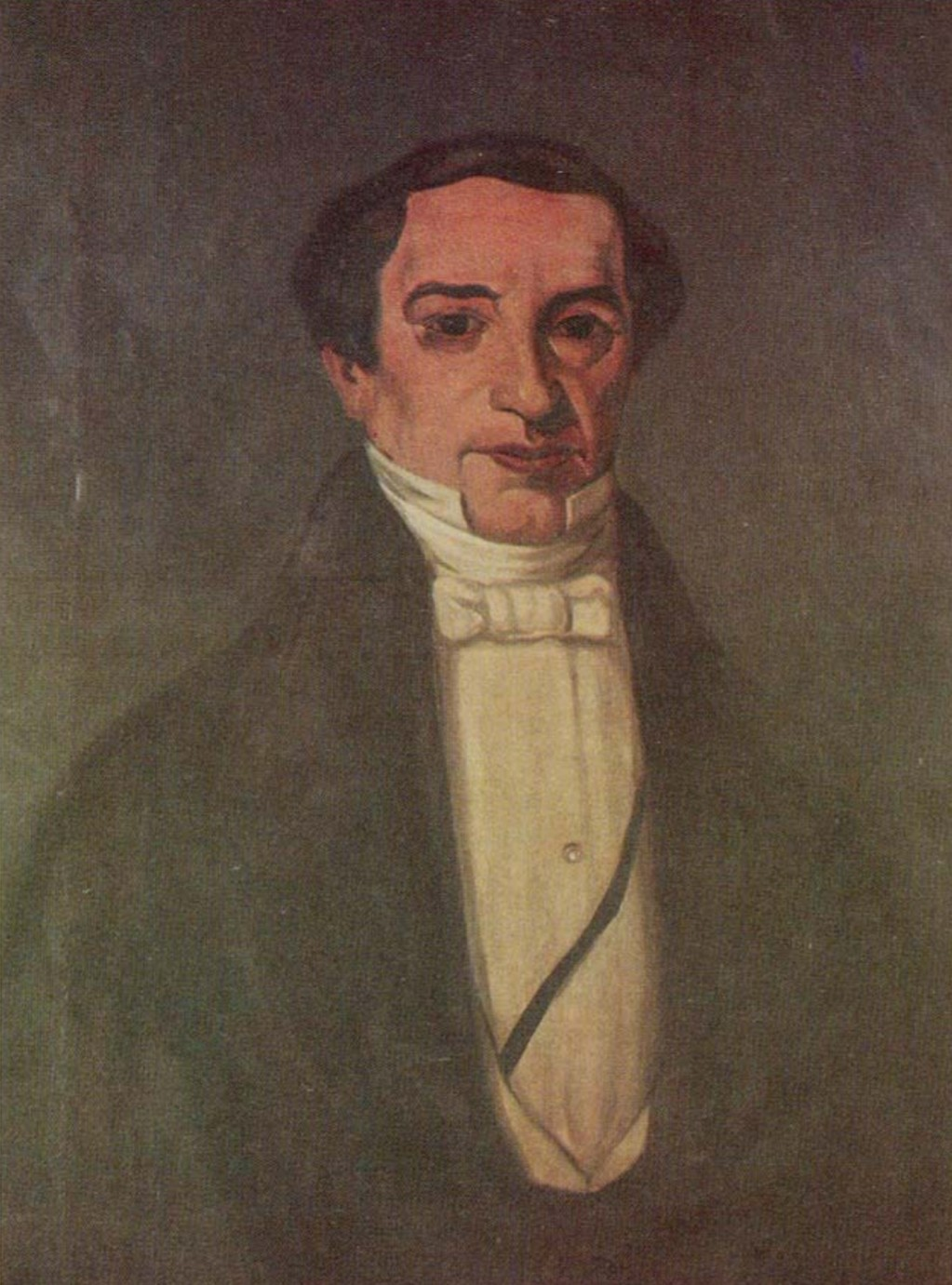

Minister of external and internal relations
- In office May 19, 1822 – March 19, 1823
- Monarch: Agustín I
- Preceded by: Office established
- Succeeded by: Andrés Quintana Roo

Minister of Justice
- In office April 8, 1829 – December 18, 1829
- President: Vicente Guerrero
- Preceded by: Joaquín de Iturbide
- Succeeded by: Joaquín de Iturbide

Member of the Congress of Chilpancingo
- In office September 13, 1813 – December 15, 1815
- Preceded by: Office established
- Succeeded by: Office abolished

President of the Chamber of Deputies (Mexico)
- In office 1828–1828
- Preceded by: José María Tornel
- Succeeded by: José María Gil y Camino
- In office 1829–1829
- Preceded by: Juan Cayetano Portugal
- Succeeded by: José Ignacio Basadre

Personal details
- Born: 27 March 1776 Tlaxcala, New Spain
- Died: 17 September 1831 (aged 55) Puebla, Mexico
- Party: Liberal
- Scientific career

José Manuel de Herrera (27 March 1776 – 17 September 1831) was a Mexican Catholic priest, writer, politician and professor of New Spain. He joined the insurgents during the Mexican War of Independence. He directed the newspaper Correo Americano del Sur.

== Biography ==
He studied at the Carolino College of Puebla, where he obtained a bachelor's and a doctorate. He was priest of Santa Ana Acatlán and Huamuxtitlán. He served as chaplain of the royalist army commanded by Mateo Musitu in Chiautla de la Sal. At the end of 1811, when José María Morelos took the place, he was apprehended along with the rest of the royalist soldiers. However, he decided to go over to the insurgent side, being appointed military vicar.

After the capture of Oaxaca in 1812, he gave a solemn mass in the Oaxaca Cathedral to celebrate the occasion. Two months later, Morelos commissioned him to found and direct the Correo Americano del Sur newspaper, in this publication he collaborated with Carlos María de Bustamante. In September 1813, he was a deputy of the Chilpancingo Congress representing the Tecpan province. He collaborated in the drafting of the Constitutional Decree for the Liberty of Mexican America, he was a signatory to it, as well as the Solemn Act of the Declaration of Independence of North America.

In 1815, Morelos appointed him plenipotentiary to negotiate with the United States government in Washington D.C. the supply of arms and ammunition. For this trip, Morelos entrusted him with the custody of his son Juan Almonte, however they only managed to reach New Orleans. After the death of Morelos, Herrera returned to Puebla, where he accepted the pardon offered by the viceroy Juan Ruiz de Apodaca.

At the instructions of Bishop Antonio Joaquín Pérez, he taught a Chair in Philosophy at his alma mater. In 1821, after the independence of Mexico had been consummated, Agustín de Iturbide appointed him Minister of Foreign and Internal Relations of the First Mexican Empire. During Vicente Guerrero's government, he was appointed Minister of Justice and Ecclesiastical Business.

He was the President of the Chamber of Deputies in 1828 and 1829.
