= Matios =

Matios is a Ukrainian surname. Notable people with the surname include:

- Anatolii Matios (born 1969), Ukrainian colonel general
- Maria Matios (born 1959), Ukrainian poet, novelist, and official

== See also ==
- Mateos
- Matias
