= Francisco Zarco =

Mexican journalist and politician (1829–1869)

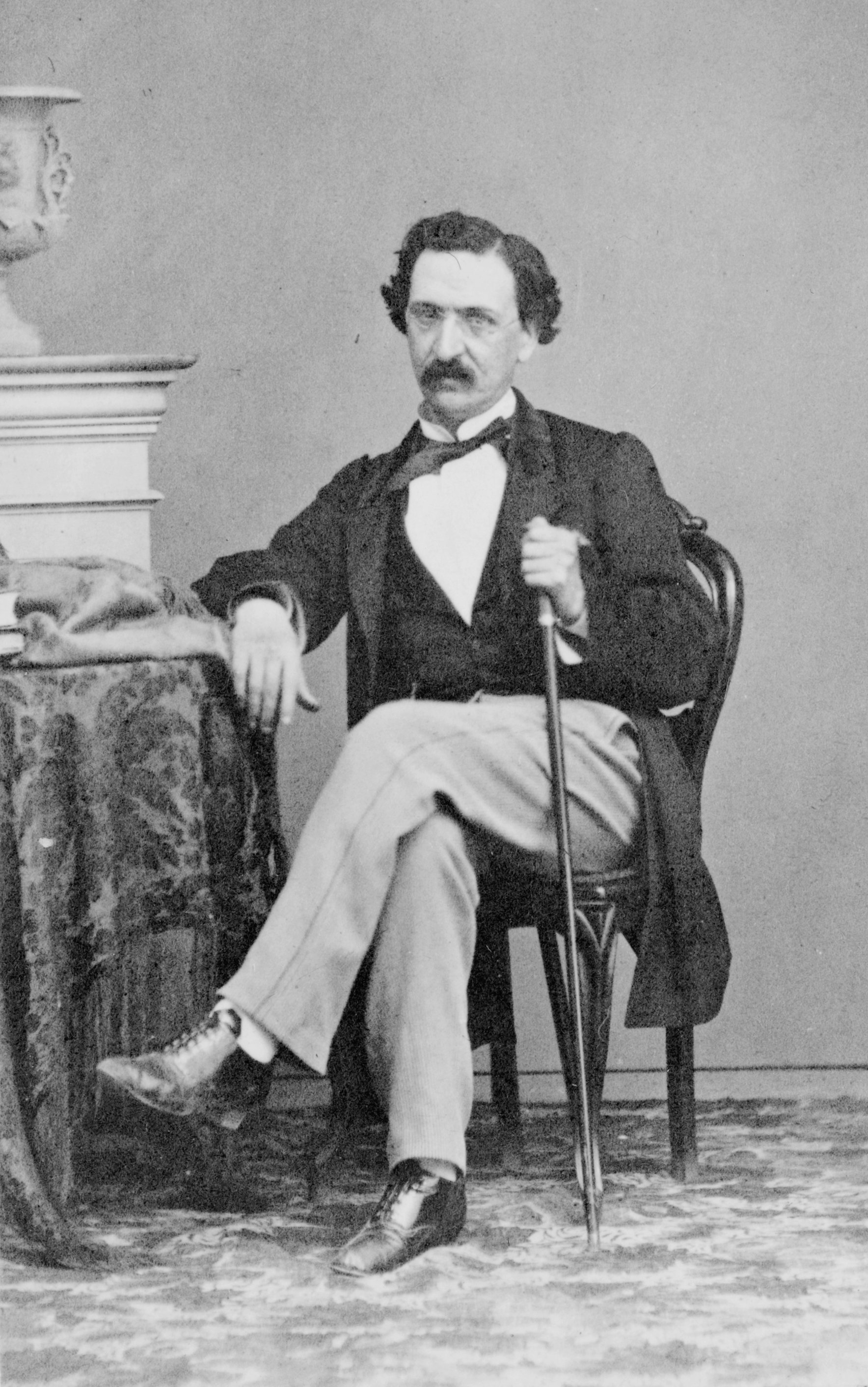
Francisco Zarco

Joaquín Francisco Zarco Mateos (Note: In this Mexican name, the surname is Zarco and the second or maternal family name is Mateos.) (4 December 1829 – 22 December 1869) was a Mexican journalist and historian from Durango. He served in the Constituent Congress that drafted the 1857 Constitution and held cabinet positions in the federal government under President Benito Juárez.

== Life and work ==
Francisco Zarco was born in the city of Durango in 1829 and was schooled in Mexico City and Toluca. Having mastered English, French and Italian, his first public post was as a translator for the foreign ministry. During the War of 1846–1848, he worked for the government-in-exile in the city of Querétaro under Luis de la Rosa Oteiza. Following the signing of the Treaty of Guadalupe Hidalgo, he relocated to the capital and began writing for a number of periodicals. The criticisms he published of Mariano Arista, president in 1851–1853, earned him the first in a series of prison sentences.

Zarco adhered to the 1854 Plan of Ayutla, which called for the removal of President Antonio López de Santa Anna and the convening of a Constitutional Convention. The convention was convened in 1856, Zarco was elected to it and, during his tenure, he prepared his Historia del Congreso Extraordinario Constituyente de 1856–1857, a daily record of the proceedings. (Note: Wikimedia Commons has a file available for this publication.) As a member of the convention, Zarco was a fierce defender of the principles of press freedoms. The new liberal Constitution the convention produced was promulgated on 5 February 1857, which triggered the start of the Reform War of 1857–1861 between Conservatives and Liberals.

During the war, he carried out several clandestine missions for the government-in-exile of Benito Juárez and published a pamphlet denouncing the 1859 massacre of Tacubaya by Conservative forces under Leonardo Márquez. Zarco was arrested by the government of Ignacio Comonfort on 30 July 1859 but managed to escape. He was arrested again on 13 May 1860 and imprisoned until the Liberals released him 25 December of that year, during which time he was tortured and his health declined severely.

In January 1861, President Juárez appointed him secretary of foreign affairs and, later, secretary of the interior. From those positions he oversaw the enactment of laws governing the registration of foreign citizens and the secularisation of hospitals and charitable institutions, and, in conjunction with Guillermo Prieto, drafted the Organic Law on Press Freedom ("ley de imprenta"), enacted on 2 February 1861. He resigned from his positions in May of that year to return to his work as a journalist.

During the French Intervention of 1861–1867 he followed Juárez into exile in various of the nation's cities but ultimately took refuge in New York City in 1864, where he continued to write articles, published across the Americas, denouncing the empire of Maximilian. He returned to Mexico with the restoration of the republic in 1867, when he was elected to the Chamber of Deputies for the Federal District, serving on the standing committees on constitutional affairs and press freedoms.

Francisco Zarco died of tuberculosis in Mexico City on 22 December 1869, at the age of 40. He was buried in the capital's Panteón de San Fernando.

== Legacy ==
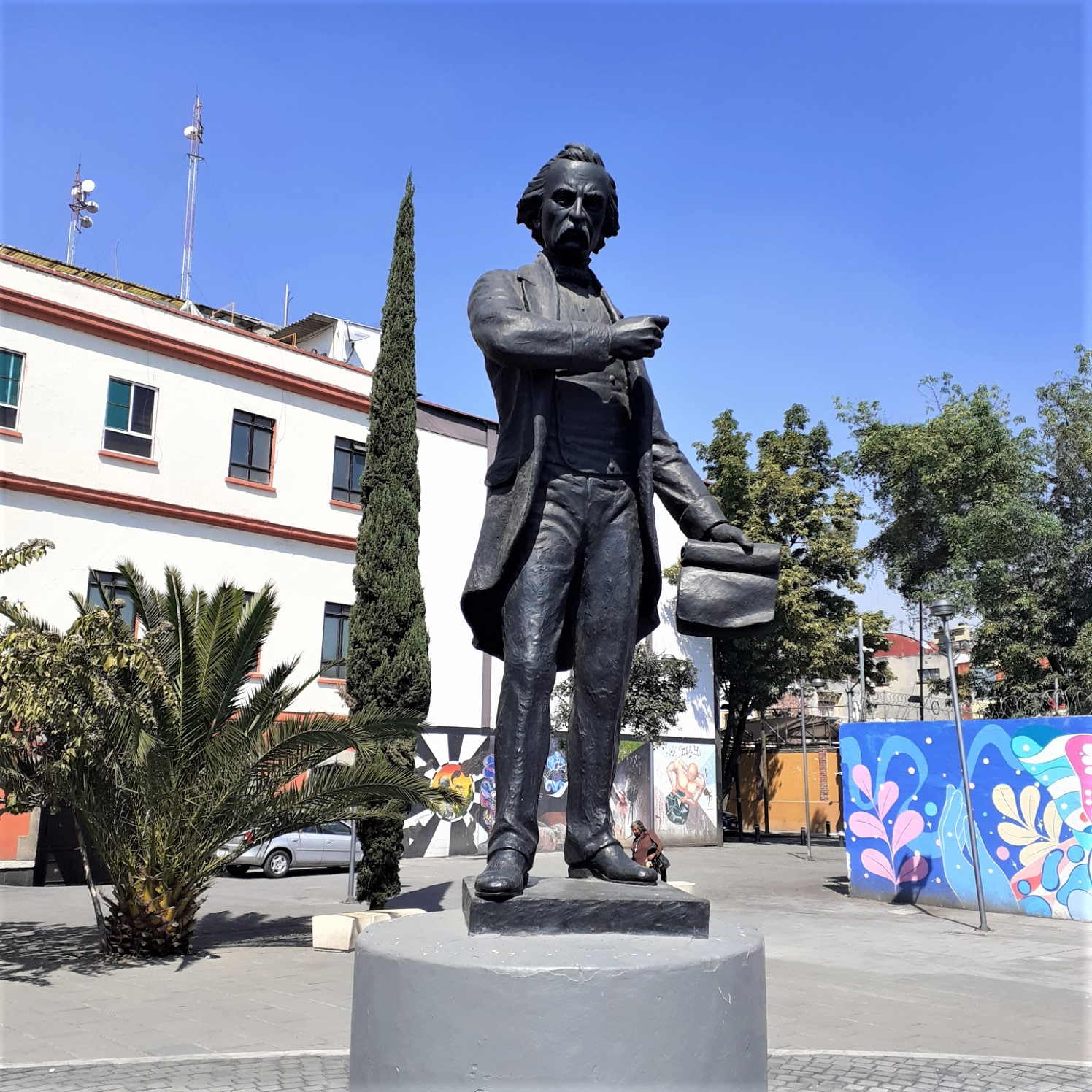
Monument to Francisco Zarco, Mexico City.

On the day of his death, the Chamber of Deputies ordered his name inscribed on the Congressional Wall of Honour. A statue in his honour stands in a public square named for him on Mexico City's Paseo de la Reforma and is a rallying point for members of the journalism profession. (Note: 19.438°N 99.146°W) A Navy patrol boat bears his name, as do a sports stadium and a dam in the state of Durango.
