= Statue of Minerva, Guadalajara =

Statue in Guadalajara, Jalisco, Mexico

Statue of Minerva
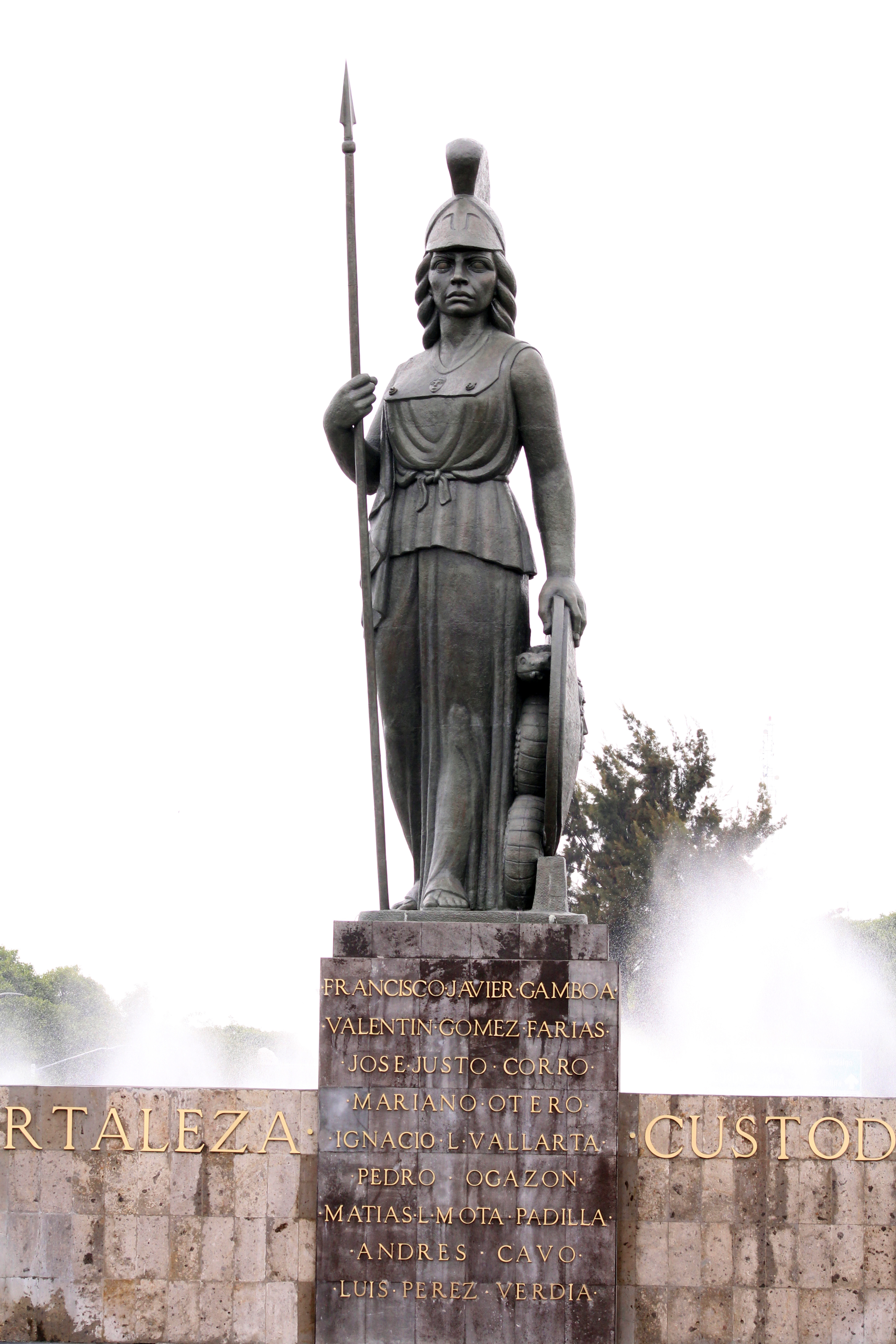
- The statue in 2011
- Artist: Joaquín Arias
- Year: 1957
- Medium: Bronze sculpture
- Subject: Minerva
- Dimensions: 11 m (36 ft)
- Weight: 4.5 t
- Location: Guadalajara, Jalisco, Mexico; 20°40′28″N 103°23′15″W

A statue of Minerva, the Roman goddess of wisdom and strategic warfare (colloquially known as La Minerva), stands in a roundabout fountain in Guadalajara, Mexico. The bronze sculpture rests on a large pedestal inscribed with the names of 18 notable citizens of the city. Depicted with Indigenous facial features, Minerva holds a spear and a shield, while the pedestal also bears the inscription, "May justice, wisdom and strength guard this loyal city", in Spanish. Although initially criticized by residents, the monument has since become a symbol of Guadalajara.

== Description and history ==
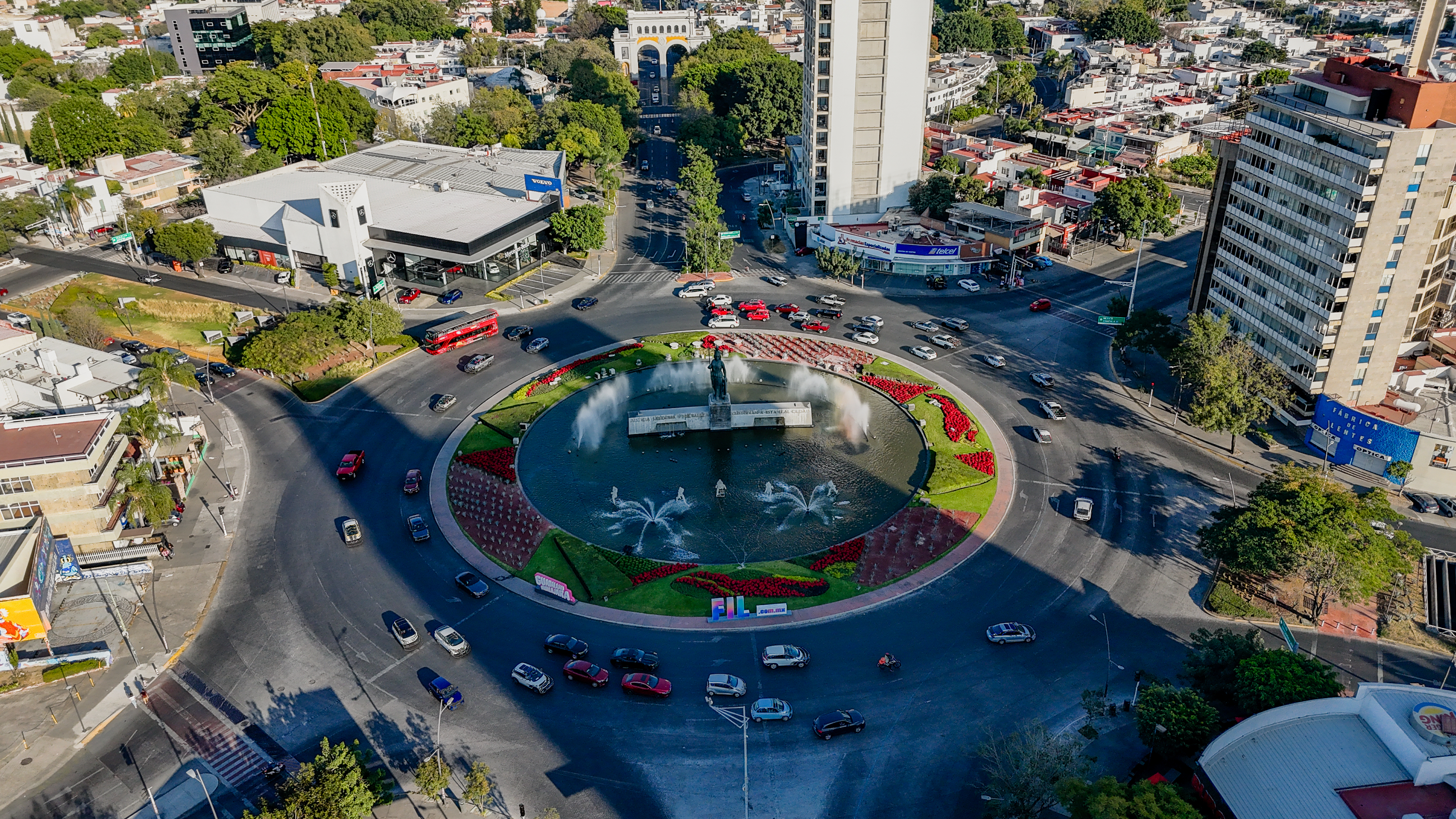
Full view of the Minerva roundabout in 2024

The statue was built between 1956 and 1957 at the request of Jalisco governor Agustín Yáñez. Representing Minerva, the Roman goddess of wisdom and strategic warfare, the monument formed part of Yáñez's vision of promoting Guadalajara as the "Athens of Mexico". It was unveiled on 15 September 1957.

Minerva is a bronze sculpture created by Joaquín Arias and Pedro Medina Guzmán, who cast the figure in Aguascalientes, while architect Julio de la Peña was responsible for the overall design of the monument. The project cost Mex$1,250,000 ($21984518068 in 2025, considering inflation), of which $75,000 ($1319071084) went to Arias. The roundabout has a diameter of 74 meters.

Minerva is depicted wearing a Late Roman ridge helmet and a goatskin aegis across her chest. She holds a spear in her right hand and a shield in her left. Her face has Indigenous facial traits as Arias modified the original project, which had called for a Greek figure, to reflect local characteristics. He modeled the statue on photographs of notable women from Jalisco. although a rumor claims the face was based on Yáñez's. Between her and her shield is a python, symbolizing Erichthonius, an early ruler of ancient Athens.

Symbolically, Minerva guards the city. The statue stands 8 meters (26 ft) tall and weighs 4.5 metric tons (4.4 long tons; 5.0 short tons). At her feet, the following slogan is inscribed: "Justicia, Sabiduría y Fortaleza, custodian a esta leal Ciudad" (transl. May justice, wisdom and strength, guard this loyal city). The pedestal, which measures 25 meters (82 ft) in length and 3 meters (9.8 ft) in height, is engraved with the names of 18 notable citizens:

- Francisco Javier Gamboa
- Valentín Gómez Farías
- José Justo Corro
- Mariano Otero
- Ignacio L. Vallarta
- Pedro Ogazón
- Matías de la Mota Padilla
- Luis Pérez Verdía
- Fernando Calderón
- José María Vigil
- José López Portillo y Rojas
- Enrique González Martínez
- Manuel López Cotilla
- Salvador García Diego
- Pablo Gutiérrez
- Jacobo Gálvez
- Manuel Gómez Ibarra
- Andrés Cavo

The statue is hollow, and in 2021 it underwent restoration after cracks were found in its spear, knee, and torso. In 2025, additional restoration work was carried out at the roundabout in preparation for the 2026 FIFA World Cup. As part of the project, the roundabout was adapted to improve accessibility and pedestrian safety. The interior area was expanded to allow public access and the installation of benches, while new pedestrian crossings, illuminated zebra crossings, and updated signage were added. The works also included wheelchair-accessible ramps and audible traffic signals to accommodate visitors with disabilities.

== Reception ==
Initially, the statue was received unfavorably by some residents, who felt it did not adequately represent the goddess. Over time, however, public opinion shifted, and it has become a popular landmark in Guadalajara. Historian Bettina Monti Colombani documented a contemporary remark criticizing the statue's appearance, warning that continued repainting could result in the "autochthonous Minerva" being turned into a "green Indian". She also noted that the first widespread public appropriation of the monument occurred in 1987, when fans of C.D. Guadalajara gathered there to celebrate a team victory and attempted to dress the statue in the club's jersey.
