= Andrés Quintana Roo =

Mexican politician

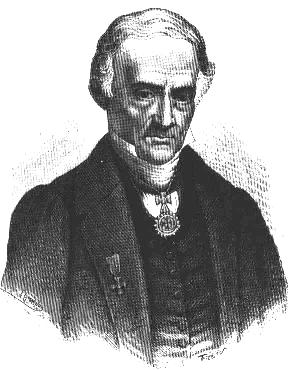
- Image of Andrés Quintana Roo

Minister of Foreign and Domestic Relations
- In office 11 August 1822 – 22 February 1823
- Preceded by: José Manuel de Herrera
- Succeeded by: José Cecilio del Valle

Congressional Deputy
- In office 1 January 1827 – 30 December 1830

President of the Chamber of Deputies
- In office 1830–1830
- Preceded by: Miguel Domínguez
- Succeeded by: Miguel Valentín y Tamayo

Congressional Deputy
- In office 29 March 1833 – 15 May 1834

President of the Chamber of Deputies
- In office 1833–1833
- Preceded by: Juan Rodrígues Puebla
- Succeeded by: José de Jesús Huerta

Minister of Justice
- In office 14 September 1833 – 1 July 1834
- Preceded by: Joaquín de Iturbide
- Succeeded by: Juan Cayetano Gómez de Portugal y Solís

Minister of the Supreme Court of Justice of the Nation
- In office 1834–1851

Personal details
- Born: 30 November 1787 Mérida, Viceroyalty of New Spain
- Died: 15 April 1851 (aged 63) Mexico City, Mexico
- Resting place: Ángel de la Independencia, Mexico City
- Spouse: Leona Vicario
- Children: María Genoveva Quintana Vicario (1817–1865); María Dolores Quintana Vicario (1820–Unknown)
- Parents: María Ana Roo Rodríguez de la Gala (1768–Unknown); José Matías Quintana Campo (1767–1841)
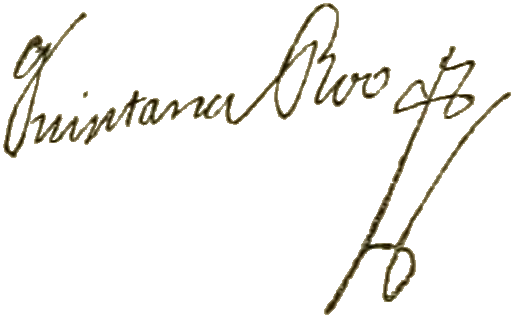
- Signature

Andrés Eligio Quintana Roo (30 November 1787 – 15 April 1851) was a Mexican liberal politician, lawyer, and writer. He was the husband of fellow independence activist Leona Vicario.

Quintana Roo was one of the most influential men in the Mexican War of Independence and served as a member of the Congress of Chilpancingo, where he presided over the National Constituent Congress, which drafted the Mexican Declaration of Independence in 1813. He served multiple terms in the Chamber of Deputies, serving as its president twice. Quintana Roo also served as a member of the Mexican Supreme Court. He edited and founded many newspapers, including El Ilustrador Americano ("The American Illustrator"), El Semanario Patriótico Americano ("The American Patriot Weekly"), and El Federalista Mexicano ("The Mexican Federalist"). The Mexican state of Quintana Roo was named in his honor.

== Early life ==
Quintana Roo was born to Don José Matías Quintana and Doña María Ana Roo de Quintana, descendants of Canarians who settled in the Yucatán Peninsula. They were married on 20 June 1786 in Mérida. His paternal grandparents were Gregorio Quintana from Galicia and Martina Tomasa de Campo from Campeche. On his mother's side, his grandparents were Antonio Roo y Font from Tenerife and Leonarda Rodríguez de la Gala, also from Campeche.

=== Sanjuanistas ===
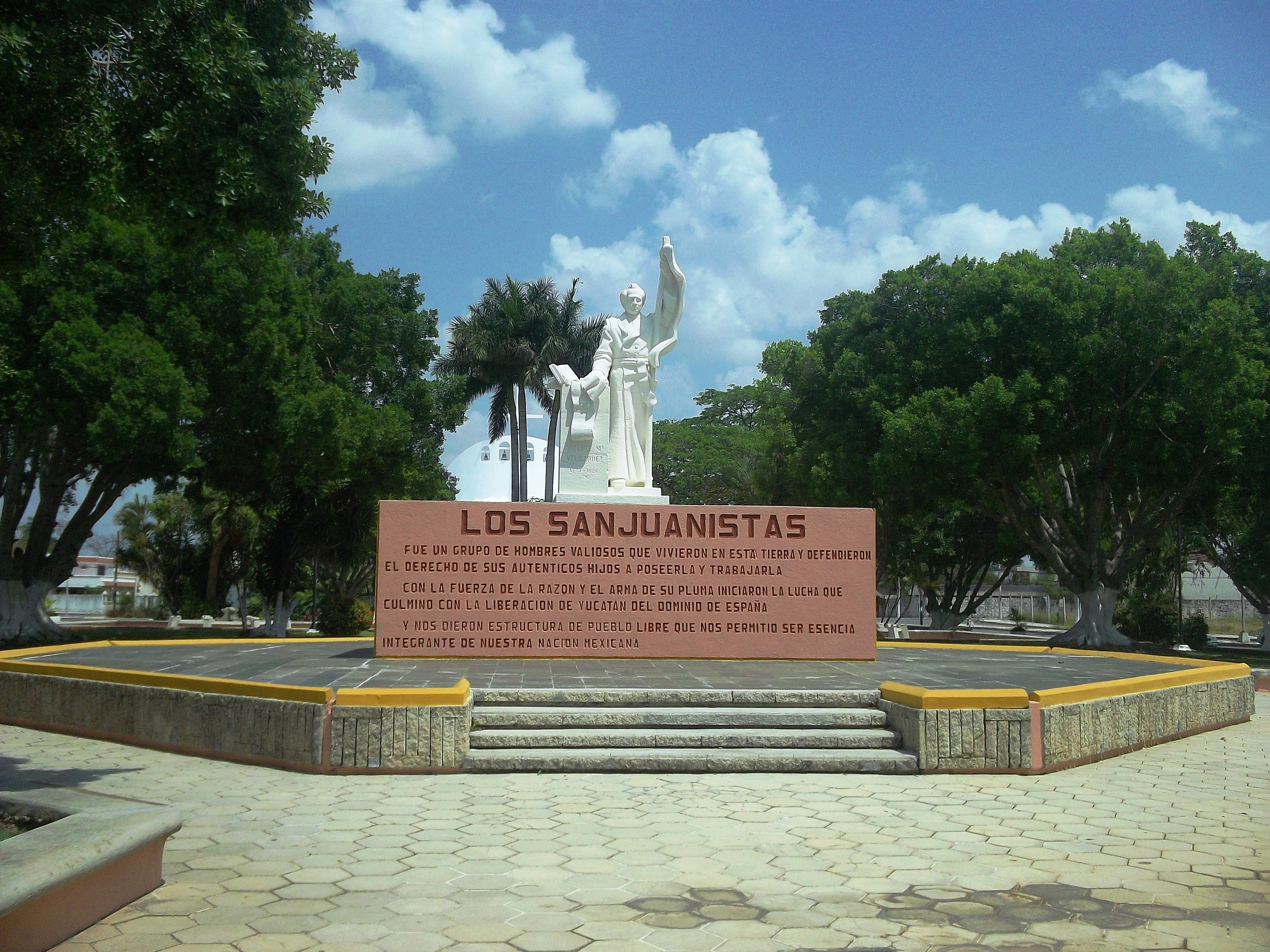
A statue of father Velázquez in Mérida commemorating the Sanjuanista movement

In 1805, the elder Quintana became part of a group known as the Sanjuanistas. The group met to discuss social and political issues, in particular the slavery of the indigenous population. The group took their name from their meeting place, the Ermita de San Juan Bautista (Hermitage of Saint John the Baptist) where the group leader, José María Velázquez, was a priest.

In 1808, the Napoleonic Army invaded Spain and overthrew the Bourbon dynasty. In 1810 in Cádiz, Spain — one of the last cities free from the French armies — an assembly (cortes) of the Spanish peninsular and overseas provinces met to discuss the future of the Spanish Empire without a monarch. This was the political climate the Sanjuanistas found themselves in.

In March 1812, the Cortes of Cádiz issued a new Spanish constitution. In July, Miguel González Lastiri, Yucatán's representative at the Cortes, arrived with seven copies of the new constitution, one of which fell into the hands of the Sanjuanistas. Having read the document, they quickly became its promoters and opened their group to anyone who wanted to join. By October, the Sanjuanistas had pressured the hesitant governor of Yucatán, Manuel Artanza y Barrial, to enforce the new constitution.

Still, many were opposed to the changes in the new Spanish constitution. The primary group that formed to oppose the changes and the Sanjuanistas were the Rutineros. Where the Sanjuanistas wanted social change and liberty from the Spanish crown, the Rutineros sought to maintain the social and political order. When the first printing press came to Yucatán in 1813, the two groups confronted each other through newspapers and pamphlets.

In 1814, King Fernando VII was restored to his throne and disavowed the constitution put forth by the Cortes of Cádiz and ruled as an absolute monarch. With the triumph of the conservative forces, the environment quickly turned hostile for the Sanjuanistas, and Quintana was arrested and jailed in the fort of San Juan de Ulúa in Veracruz, along with fellow Sanjuanistas Lorenzo de Zavala and José Francisco Bates.

=== Education ===
Andrés Quintana Roo studied in the Seminario de San Ildefonso de Mérida where he proved his great capacity as a writer. In 1802, at the age of 15, he finished his Latin studies at San Ildefonso. He continued his studies, receiving certifications in Arts in 1805 and Theology and Doctrine in 1808. His instructor of the arts, D. Pablo Moreno, said of him that "he had always manifested a judgement and maturity superior to his age".

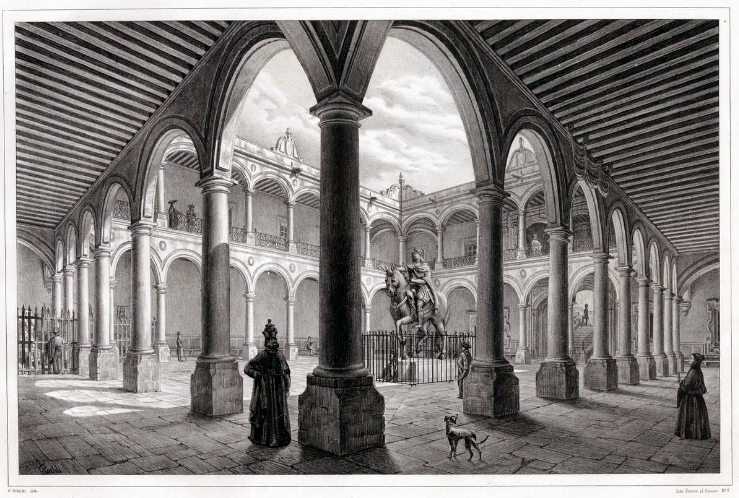
The interior of the Real y Pontifica Universidad de Nueva España during the 19th century

In December 1808 (only two months after the overthrow of Viceroy José de Iturrigaray by ultra-conservative elements), he arrived in Mexico City to continue his studies at the Real y Pontificia Universidad de Nueva España ("Royal and Pontifical University of New Spain"). With him he took a letter of recommendation from the Bishop of Yucatán and Tabasco, Pedro Agustín Esteves y Ugarte, that said he "always had a singular application and talent, performing his literary functions with all brilliance and contributing with modesty, Christianity and good bearing in his behaviour."

In early February 1809, he had earned his Bachelor of Arts, and by the end of the month he had earned his Bachelor of Doctrine. The latter degree was awarded by Dr. Agustín Pomposo Fernández. Following his graduation, Quintana Roo interned at the law firm of Fernández, practising jurisprudence for two years.

=== Leona Vicario ===
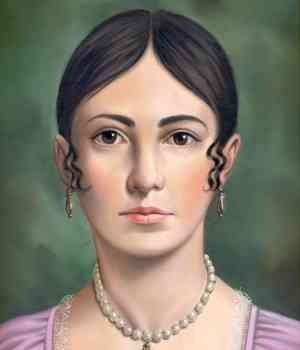
Illustration of a young Leona Vicario

During his time working for Agustín Fernández, Quintana Roo met Leona Vicario (María de la Soledad Leona Martín y Vicario), the niece of Fernández. Her father, Gaspar Martín Vicario, had worked for Fernández before his death. Her mother, Fernández's sister, was Camila Fernández, whose death in 1807 left Vicario in the care of her uncle.

When Quintana Roo and Vicario met, she was engaged to marry Octaviano Obregón (though not of her own choice), the son of a colonel of high birth. After the Crisis of 1808, the younger Obregón left for Spain, and the following year she met Quintana Roo. The two were an excellent match, both being interested in writing, the arts, politics, and liberation. They fell in love, and around 1811, Quintana Roo asked Fernández for permission to marry Vicario. Fernández refused, and Quintana Roo left his law practice.

== Independence ==
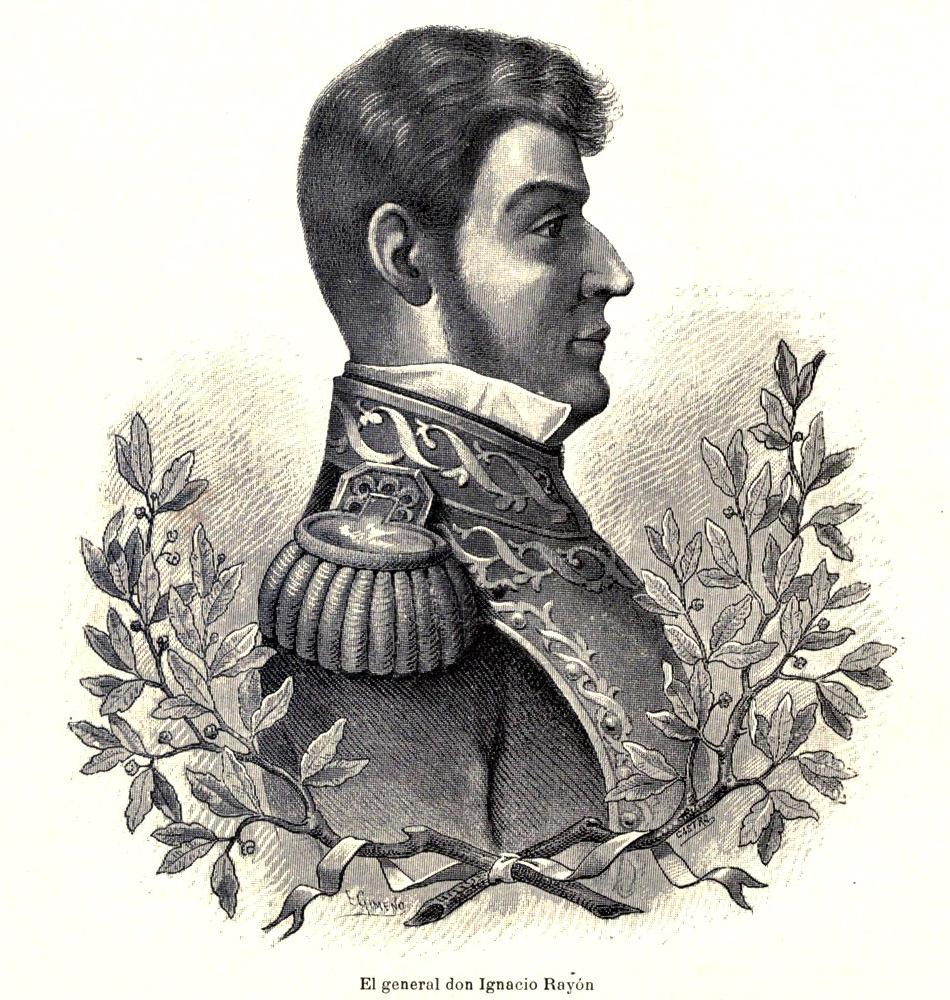
Ignacio López Rayón

In 1812, after leaving the employment of Agustín Fernández and the side of his beloved Leona Vicario, Andrés Quintana Roo threw himself into his ideals. Along with José Ignacio Aguado and Manuel Fernández, the son of his former employer, Quintana Roo travelled to Tlalpujahua, Valladolid (in present-day Michoacán) west of Mexico City to join the army of Ignacio López Rayón. López Rayón had been the private secretary of Miguel Hidalgo y Costilla, the priest who had begun the fight for independence in Guanajuato just two years earlier. After the defeat of Hidalgo's army at the Battle of Calderon Bridge, López Rayón escaped and rejoined the rebel army in Zacatecas, while Hidalgo and his top generals were captured and executed in late July 1811.

Much like his father, Andrés Quintana Roo would use the pen as his chosen weapon. He wrote for the insurgent newspaper El Ilustrador Americano (American Illustrator) created by José María Cos, and in July 1812 founded the more ideological El Semanario Patriótico Americano (The American Patriot Weekly), which he edited with Cos. In September 1812 he wrote his most famous poem "Dieciséis de septiembre" (Sixteenth of September), a patriotic poem that decries tyranny.

=== Los Guadalupes ===

As a lawyer, one of Ignacio López Rayón's great gifts was organization. After the defeat of Hidalgo, he gave structure to the army under the auspices of the Junta de Zitácuaro, one of the first governing bodies in Mexico not to recognize the authority of the Viceroyalty of New Spain. In addition to military and administrative organization, López Rayón organized a group of spies and propagandists which came to be known as Los Guadalupes. They took their name from the Virgin of Guadalupe to juxtapose themselves from the Spaniards who venerated the Virgin of the Remedies. In order to protect their identities, Los Guadalupes would use various pseudonyms in their communications.

Very few people are known for certain to have been in this group, but it is likely they centred their operations in Mexico City, and most of them were lawyers. Still, they were a diverse group that included women, priests, and nobles as well. They maintained regular communication with López Rayón, sent him current newspapers and publications from Spain and the U.S., and weapons, money, and men. Perhaps most importantly, they set up a line of communication between López Rayón and José María Morelos y Pavón.

Leona Vicario was deeply involved in the work of Los Guadalupes, but in February 1813 one of her letters was intercepted by then royalist and future President of Mexico, Captain Anastasio Bustamante. Being warned that her arrest was imminent, Vicario fled Mexico City on foot. Her uncle discovered her whereabouts and convinced her to return to Mexico City, where she was brought to the Colegio de San Miguel de Belén as a prisoner.

Quintana Roo heard of her imprisonment, and being unable to go himself, sent Francisco Arroyave, Antonio Vázquez Aldana, and Luis Alconedo to liberate her. They arrived at the Colegio de Belén on the night of 23 April 1813. They were disguised as viceregal officers and demanded to interrogate Vicario privately. Instead, they sneaked her out of the Colegio and smuggled her out of Mexico City disguised as mule drivers, carrying with them supplies for the insurgents.

Andrés Quintana Roo and Leona Vicario were married soon after in Tlalpujahua.

=== Congress of Chilpancingo ===
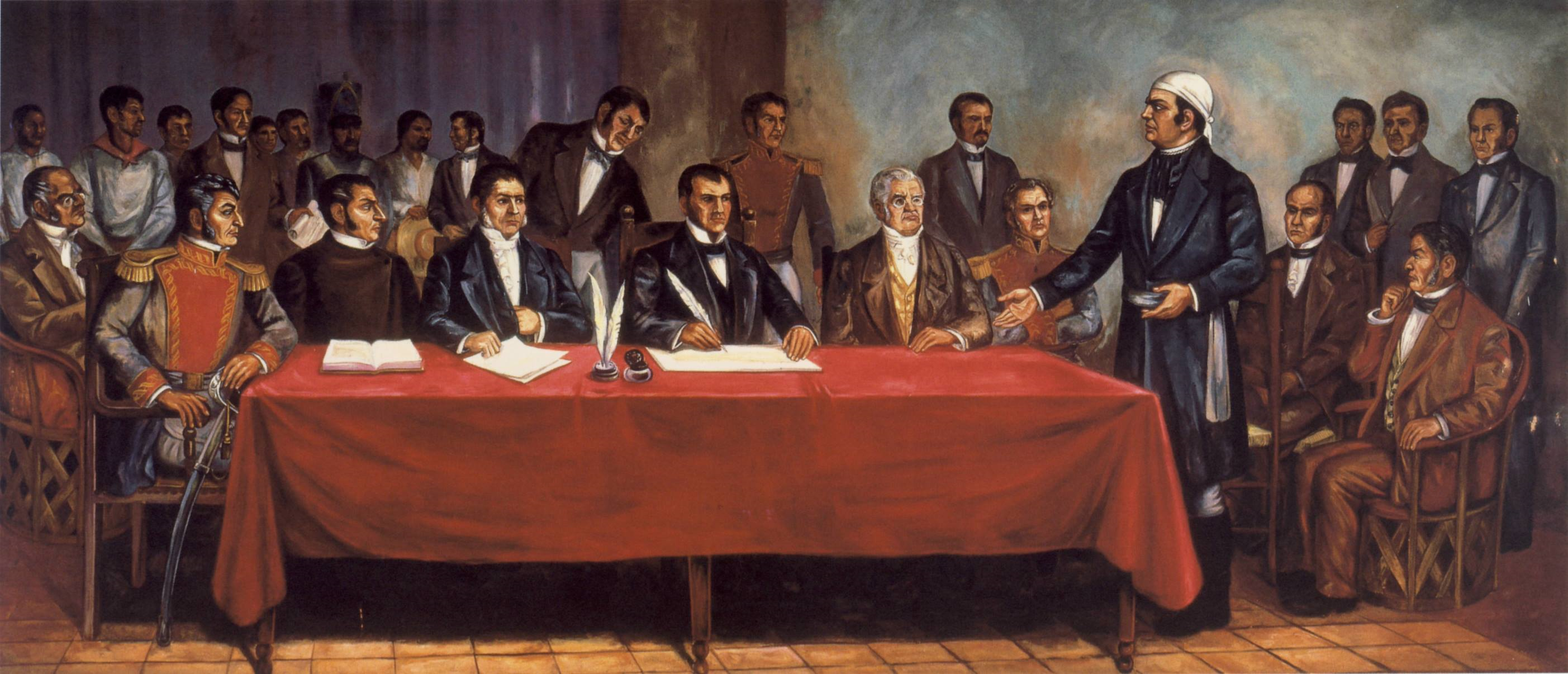
Congress of Chilpancingo

With the power of the Junta de Zitácuaro waning after multiple military defeats, José María Morelos took the initiative in reorganizing the scattered insurgent armies and called for a congress to unite the opposition to Spanish rule. This congress met in September 1813 in the city of Chilpancingo in the province of Tecpan (present-day Guerrero).

Initially, Quintana Roo was elected to vice president of the congress, but when José María Murguía y Galardi couldn't fulfil his duties, Quintana Roo assumed the presidency in his stead. The primary end of the congress was the drafting of a constitution. On the first day, Morelos read the Sentimientos de la Nación ("Feelings of the Nation"), an outline of his ideas on how an independent Mexico should be governed. Then, on 6 November, the congress signed the Acta Solemne de la Declaración de la Independencia de la América Septentrional ("Solemn Act of the Declaration of Independence of North America"), which was written in part by Quintana Roo.

After the Declaration, Morelos moved to retake the city of Valladolid as a permanent seat for the Congress. The attack was a disaster. Morelos's army was defeated by future Emperor Agustín de Iturbide, and his general, Mariano Matamoros, was captured and executed. Morelos attempted to ransom Matamoros in exchange for 300 Spanish prisoners, a negotiation that failed. Morelos was ordered by the Congress to Acapulco to carry out the execution of the Spanish soldiers and then stripped of his command.

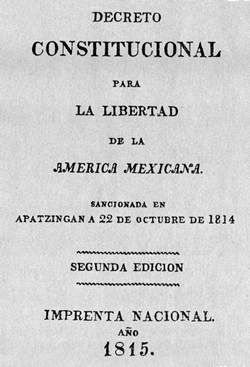
Constitution of Apatzingán

Following these defeats, Quintana Roo and the Congress were forced to relocate frequently. On 22 October 1814, in the city of Apatzingán, the Congress issued the Decreto Constitucional para la Libertad de la America Mexicana ("Constitutional Decree for the Liberty of Mexican America"), better known as the Constitution of Apatzingán, drafted by Quintana Roo, Carlos María de Bustamonte, and José Manuel de Herrera.

In May 1814, Fernando VII had regained his throne and abolished the liberal Constitution of Cádiz. With the defeat of the French forces in Spain, Fernando was free to send more soldiers to Mexico, and so Iturbide redoubled his efforts against Morelos and the Congress. Much of the territory that had been won by Morelos was lost, and the Congress was kept always on the move. In July 1815 Oaxaca and Acapulco fell to José Gabriel de Armijo. In late September, the Congress agreed to move to Tehuacán, Puebla, guarded by the armies of Morelos and Nicolás Bravo.

En route to Tehuacán, on 5 November, the caravan was intercepted by royal soldiers commanded by Manuel de la Concha. Morelos covered the retreat of the Congress and was captured, taken to Mexico City, and executed on 22 December. Though the Congress reached Tehuacán, it was dissolved shortly after.

=== Amnesty ===
While the bulk of the deputies of the Congress of Chilpancingo fled to Tehuacán, Andrés Quintana Roo and Leona Vicario remained in Michoacán. They had been offered amnesties by different parties during the collapse of the Congress but they had steadfastly refused. They spent most of 1816 on the run. They were aided in their flight by a transition of Viceroys. Félix María Calleja del Rey had been judged too harsh and dictatorial in his rule, and the much more temperate Juan Ruiz de Apodaca was sent to replace him. Apodaca ended the practice of summary executions and showed leniency to insurgent leaders who surrendered themselves. Still, Quintana Roo would not accept a pardon.

On 3 January 1817, hidden in a cave in Achipixtla, Quintana Roo's wife gave birth to their first child, Genoveva. Now with a child, their flight became more difficult, but they persisted for another year until in March 1818 they were found by two former soldiers of the insurgency. Vicario acquiesced to be taken, and Quintana Roo negotiated his surrender shortly after, fearing for his wife's safety.

Both Quintana Roo and Vicario had standing offers of pardon which they begrudgingly accepted, after which the couple settled in Toluca, where Vicario had been raised. After arranging their affairs and securing the confiscated property of his wife, Quintana Roo began the process of gaining admittance to the Ilustre y Real Colegio de Abogados (Royal Bar Association). In August 1820, he was admitted, and the family relocated to Mexico City.

=== Plan of Iguala ===
In April 1820, the news reached Mexico of a revolution in Spain which had forced King Fernando VII to recognize the liberal Constitution of Cádiz. Almost immediately, provinces began to declare for the reinstated constitution and hold elections for city councils. The Constitution also allowed for freedom of the press, and in June, shortly after Apodaca affirmed the Constitution, Quintana Roo published La Libertad y la Tirania (Liberty and Tyranny) a short allegorical piece celebrating the recognition of the new Constitution in Mexico.

While the insurgents celebrated this change in circumstances, just as they had done in 1812, the conservative forces that had been putting down the insurgencies viewed the changes as a threat to their power. The aristocracy and the clergy met in secret, before the news of the Constitution became public, to discuss how to prevent knowledge of the revolution in Spain from spreading. They met in the ”La Profesa” Church, and their plan became known as the Conspiracy of the Professed. Their hopes to keep the news secret were dashed when word reached Veracruz and the intendant, José Dávila, swore to comply with the new law.

The new plan of the Conspiracy was to declare the independence of New Spain and establish an absolute monarchy. To achieve their ends, in November 1820 they convinced Apodaca to put Agustín de Iturbide in charge of the royal armies. According to the plan, Iturbide would then take over the country, declare independence from Spain, and invite Fernando VII or another European noble to rule over Mexico. All this to prevent the installation of a parliament which would limit the power of the church and the elites.

The day after Apodaca gave him his command, Iturbide set out for the south to put down the remaining insurgent armies. The task proved too much for him and his forces were defeated multiple times by the army of Vicente Guerrero, which grew stronger with every victory. Iturbide changed his tactics and sent Guerrero a letter outlining his plan for an independent Mexico. Guerrero reluctantly agreed to meet on 10 February 1821 in Acatempan, where the two generals agreed to join forces for the cause of independence. This meeting is known today as the Abrazo de Acatempan (Embrace of Acatempan).

Flag of the Army of the Three Guarantees

Following the union of the two armies, Iturbide's plan, now endorsed by Guerrero, was published to the public as the Plan of Iguala, and it established three guarantees for the people:

- the exclusivity of the Catholic religion
- independence from Spain
- political equality among all Mexicans

Because of this, Iturbide's army came to be known as the Ejército Trigarante (Army of the Three Guarantees).

Throughout the spring and summer of 1821, the Army of the Three Guarantees liberated the provinces of Mexico, suffering few defeats. In May, Apodaca (no longer viceroy after the revolution but Jefe Political Superior [Superior Political Chief]) was replaced with Juan O'Donojú who arrived in Mexico in early August. He met with Iturbide on 24 August 1821 and signed the Treaty of Córdoba establishing the independence of Mexico.

== After Independence ==
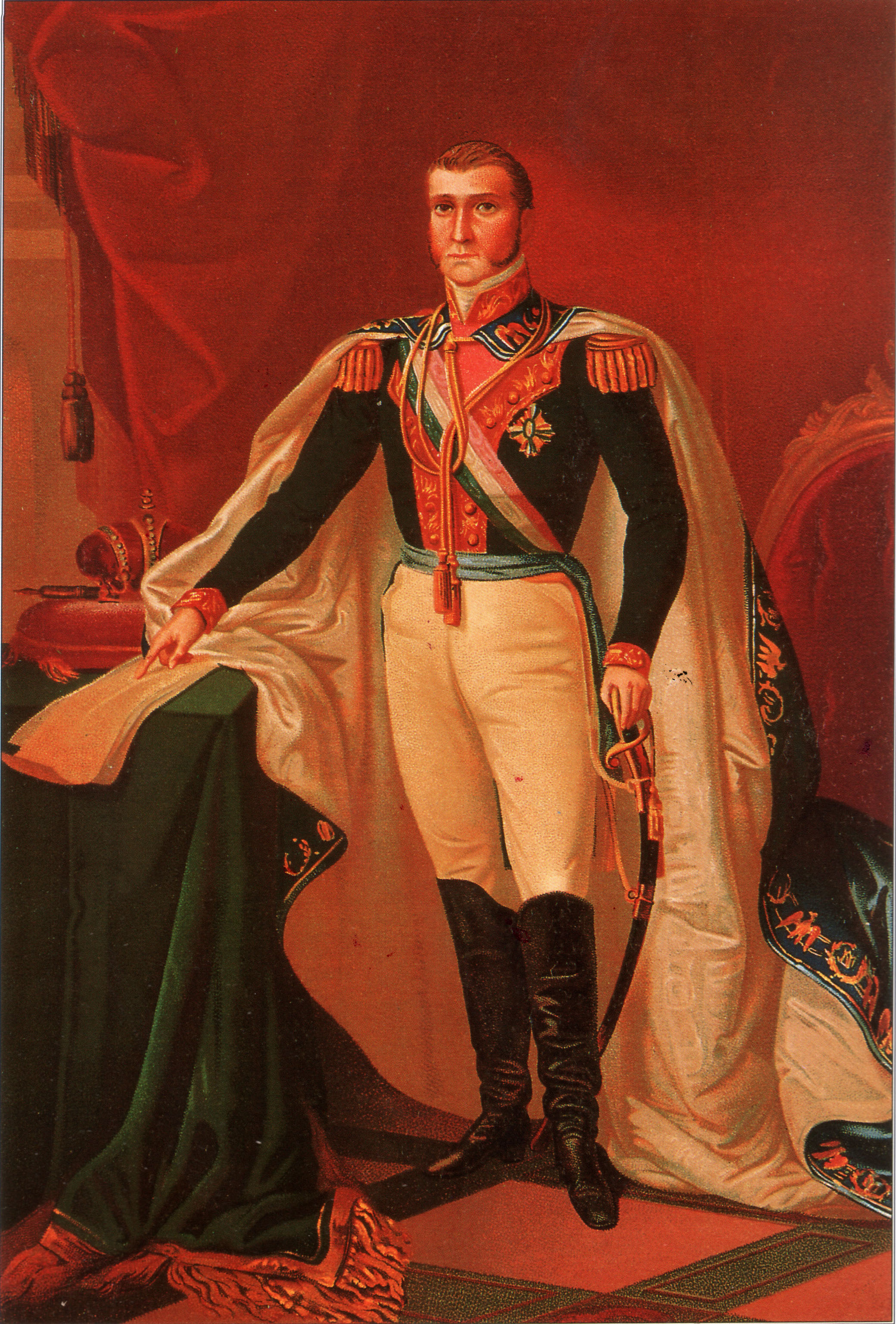
Emperor Agustín de Iturbide I

=== Mexican Empire ===
Quintana Roo briefly served as Undersecretary of Foreign and Domestic Affairs under newly crowned Emperor Agustín de Iturbide, beginning in August 1822. Although Iturbide was appointed emperor by near-universal popular support, a series of missteps saw that goodwill evaporate. In October, Iturbide dissolved the congress that had appointed him emperor and replaced it with the Junta Instituyente, which he appointed himself. Antonio López de Santa Anna started an uprising in Veracruz in December, which gained popularity after Iturbide imposed a 40% property tax on Mexicans. Despite sending out his most loyal generals to put down Santa Anna's uprising, every one of them joined Santa Anna in his Plan de la Casa Mata which called for the reinstitution of the congress dissolved the previous October.

As the Junta Instituyente was debating the reestablishment of the congress, in February 1823 Quintana Roo submitted an opinion to Francisco de Paula Alvarez (Iturbide's personal secretary) that the reconstituted congress should not have any restrictions placed upon it or the laws it could execute, including the existence of the monarchy. The letter was published publicly, and Quintana Roo was fired two days later. Iturbide would abdicate his crown before the end of March.

=== Mexican Republic ===
In 1826, the Instituto de Ciencias, Literatura y Artes (Institute of Sciences, Literature, and Art) was founded, with Quintana Roo named as vice president. In his inaugural speech, Quintana Roo praised the wisdom of President Guadalupe Victoria for establishing the institute. From 1827 until 1830, he served as a deputy in the second and third congress representing the State of Mexico. In 1830, he also served as president of the Chamber of Deputies.

==== Bustamante Presidency ====
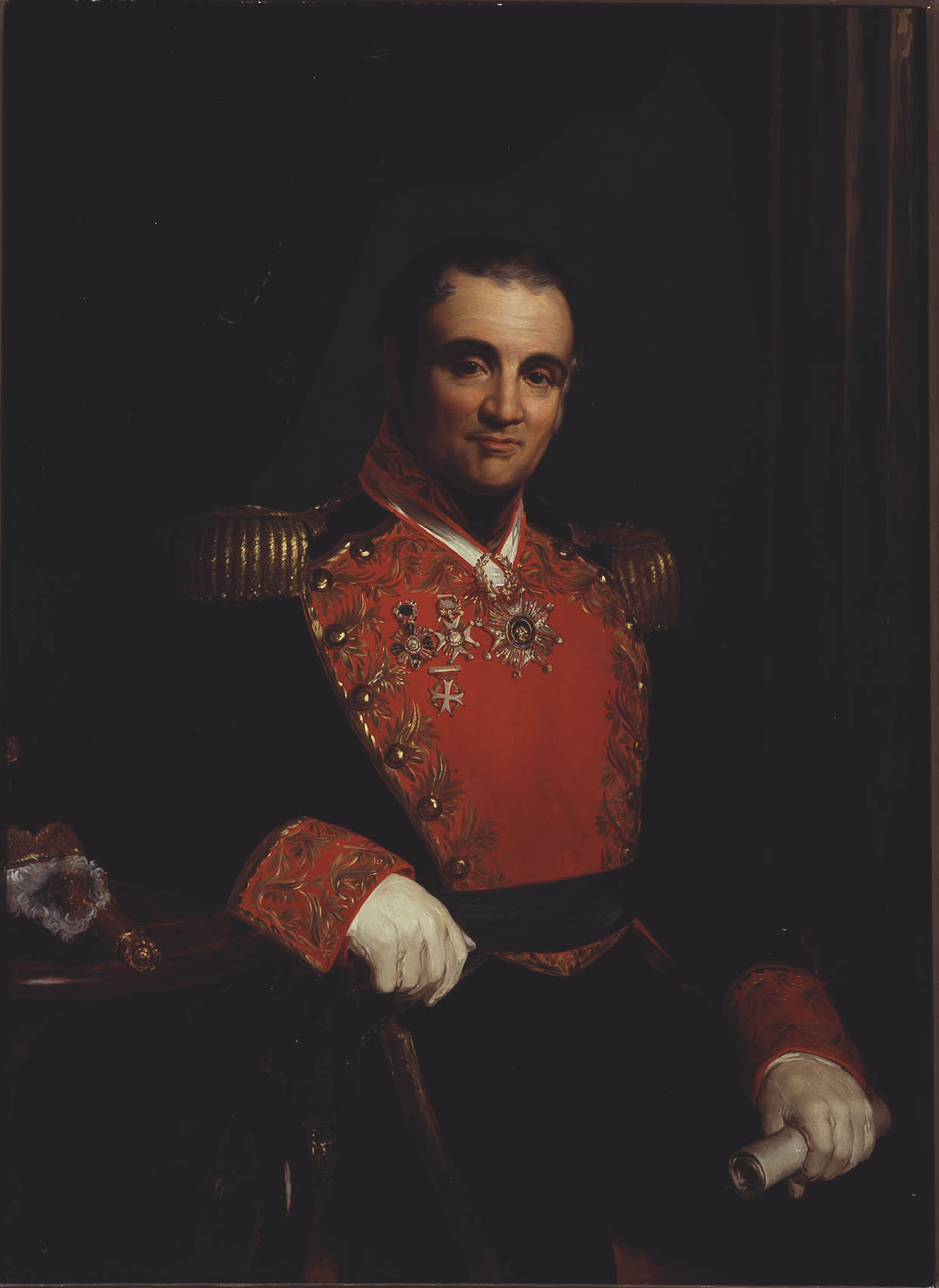
Anastasio Bustamante

In January 1830, the presidency of Vicente Guerrero (who had been appointed president extra-legally) was usurped by Anastasio Bustamante, the same man who had intercepted the letters of Leona Vicario in 1813. Soon, senators loyal to Bustamante proposed laws that would remove the legal and moral authority of Guerrero to govern. The Senate refused to act on these propositions, and so it was passed to the Chamber of Deputies, which formed a four-man commission, which included Quintana Roo, to resolve the issue. The Chamber's commission agreed that Guerrero lacked the legal and moral authority to govern, but Quintana Roo made a point to say that "if his election was not constitutional, neither, and by logical consequence, was that of Bustamante," since neither man had won an election.

Quintana Roo did not serve in the fourth congress, which began on 1 January 1831. On 3 January, Quintana Roo founded the newspaper El Federalista Mexicano (The Mexican Federalist) to criticize and challenge Bustamante's legitimacy. Bustamante ordered Quintana Roo's printing presses shut down and seized, though El Federalista Mexicano continued to be printed through April.

Bustamante's popularity began to wane after he captured and executed Guerrero (despite having already orchestrated the Camera of Deputies to declare him morally unfit to govern). A revolt began in January 1832 to remove Bustamante from power and replace him with Manuel Gómez Pedraza, who had been the legitimate winner of the election against which Guerrero revolted. The rebels offered command of their army to Santa Anna, which he accepted. The revolt was short and successful; by December, Bustamante had resigned, and Gómez Pedraza had assumed power. Gómez Pedraza was a polarizing figure. When he called congress into session in 1833, too few representatives showed up, and he formed a private council, of which Quintana Roo was a secretary, to conduct the business of congress until elections could be held in March.

==== Santa Anna Presidency ====
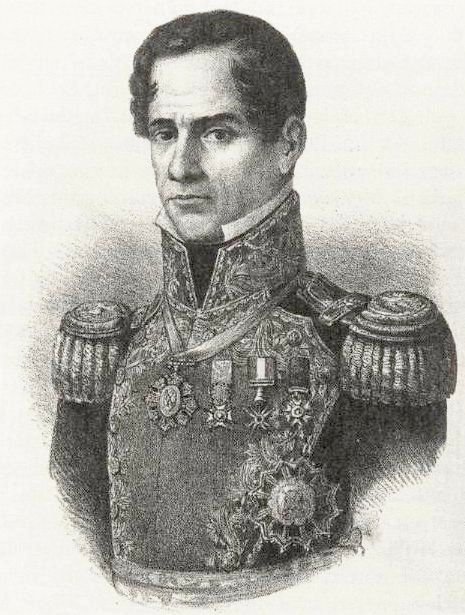
Antonio López de Santa Anna

Three months later, elections were held in which Santa Anna won the presidency, although he would frequently hand executive duties to his vice president, Valentín Gómez Farías. After the election and the exile of Bustamante, Quintana Roo rejoined the Camera of Deputies. In the fall of 1833 he was named Minister of Justice where he worked to reduce the influence of the Catholic Church on politics. In October of that year he said, "Political discussions...must be entirely alien to the chair of the Holy Spirit and the character of a religion such as Christianity, whose fundamental basis is to dispense with governments."

Religious authorities wasted no time in combating these laws. They came to Santa Anna, who was on a leave of absence from his office, to protest their change in status. Santa Anna took the side of the church and returned to Mexico City in April 1834 and asked the congress to repeal their anti-clerical laws. Congress responded by asking whether or not they had the freedom to legislate. Santa Anna answered them, "they have, but to do what is right and no more, because I make the Constitution with one hand and in the other hold the sword to ensure it is observed." In the face of Santa Anna's growing despotism, the congress suspended its activities.

Quintana Roo resigned his post as Minister of Justice in June 1834. Two days later, Santa Anna replaced him with the Bishop of Michoacán, Juan Cayetano Portugal. But not all of the government bent to the whims of Santa Anna. In late 1834, Quintana Roo was chosen to replace a magistrate of the Supreme Court, a position he would retain for the rest of his life.

=== Later life ===
Flag of the Republic of Yucatán

In 1836, the Academía de Letrán was founded by José María Lacunza, Juan Nepomuceno Lacunza, Manuel Tossiat Ferrer, and Guillermo Prieto. Quintana Roo (significantly older than the founding members) was named president for life and brought legitimacy to the group. The literary group sought to create and inspire a uniquely Mexican literature unbounded by Spanish influence. Though the group would fade away by 1840, the influence of its members would be felt for the rest of the century.

In 1838, in the midst of the Pastry War with France, Quintana Roo entrusted a letter to former Academía de Letrán member and current Minister of the Exterior Joaquín Pesado, to be delivered to his former enemy and current president (returned from exile) Anastasio Bustamante to offer a monthly stipend of 500 pesos to support the war effort. Though Bustamante refused the money, he published the letter sent by Quintana Roo in a newspaper as an example of patriotism.

On 30 March 1841, José Matías Quintana died in Mexico City. That same month, the state of Yucatán published its constitution after having declared its independence from Mexico the year before. After losing Texas in 1836 and capitulating to the French in 1839, Mexico could not risk losing another state to secession. In November, Quintana Roo was sent to Mérida to negotiate with Yucatán to remain in Mexico. Quintana Roo successfully negotiated the return of Yucatán before the new year. On his return voyage, he was briefly a prisoner of a Texas warship but was quickly released. Although the Mexican government did not agree to the terms Quintana Roo had negotiated, an agreement was reached by 1843.

On 21 August 1842, Doña Leona Vicario, his wife, died. Though crushed by her loss, he consoled himself in his daughters, his writing, and his work. Nine years later, on 15 April 1851, Andrés Quintana Roo died of pneumonia in Mexico City. His remains lie next to those of his wife, Leona, in the mausoleum of the Column of Independence in Mexico City.

== Legacy ==
Quintana Roo's name lives on in Mexican geography with the state of Quintana Roo in the Yucatán Peninsula. The name of Cancún's soccer stadium bears his name.

Statues and busts of Quintana Roo can be found around the country. There are statues in Mérida, Yucatán; Chetumal, Quintana Roo; Solidaridad, Quintana Roo; Paseo de la Reforma, Mexico City; and busts on Isla Mujeres and Cozumel, Quintana Roo.

His name was given to a public library in Mexico City. Numerous roads and schools have been named for him throughout Mexico. He was featured on the MXP$20,000 and MXN$20 bills.

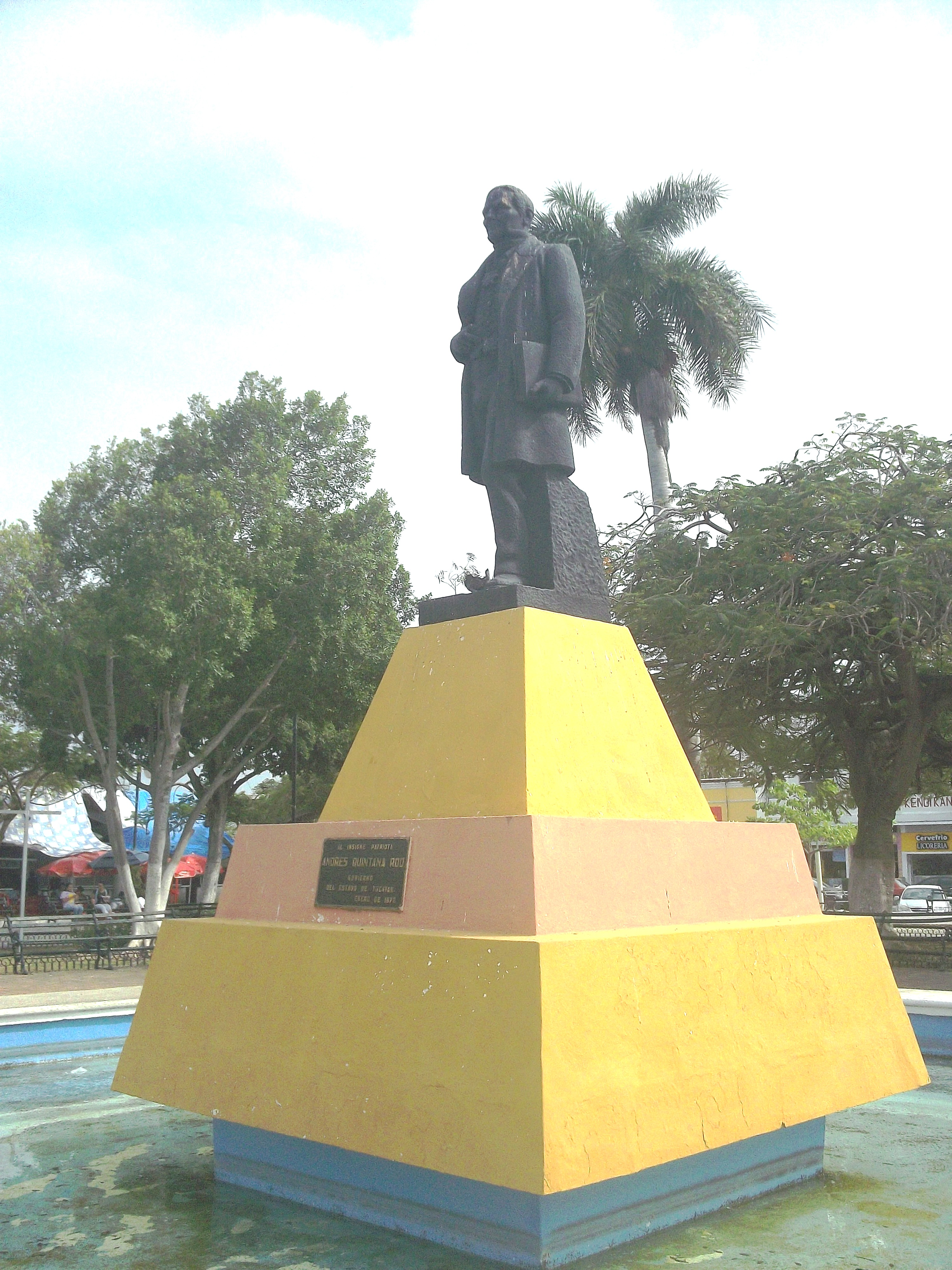
Statue of Quintana Roo in Mérida, Yucatán

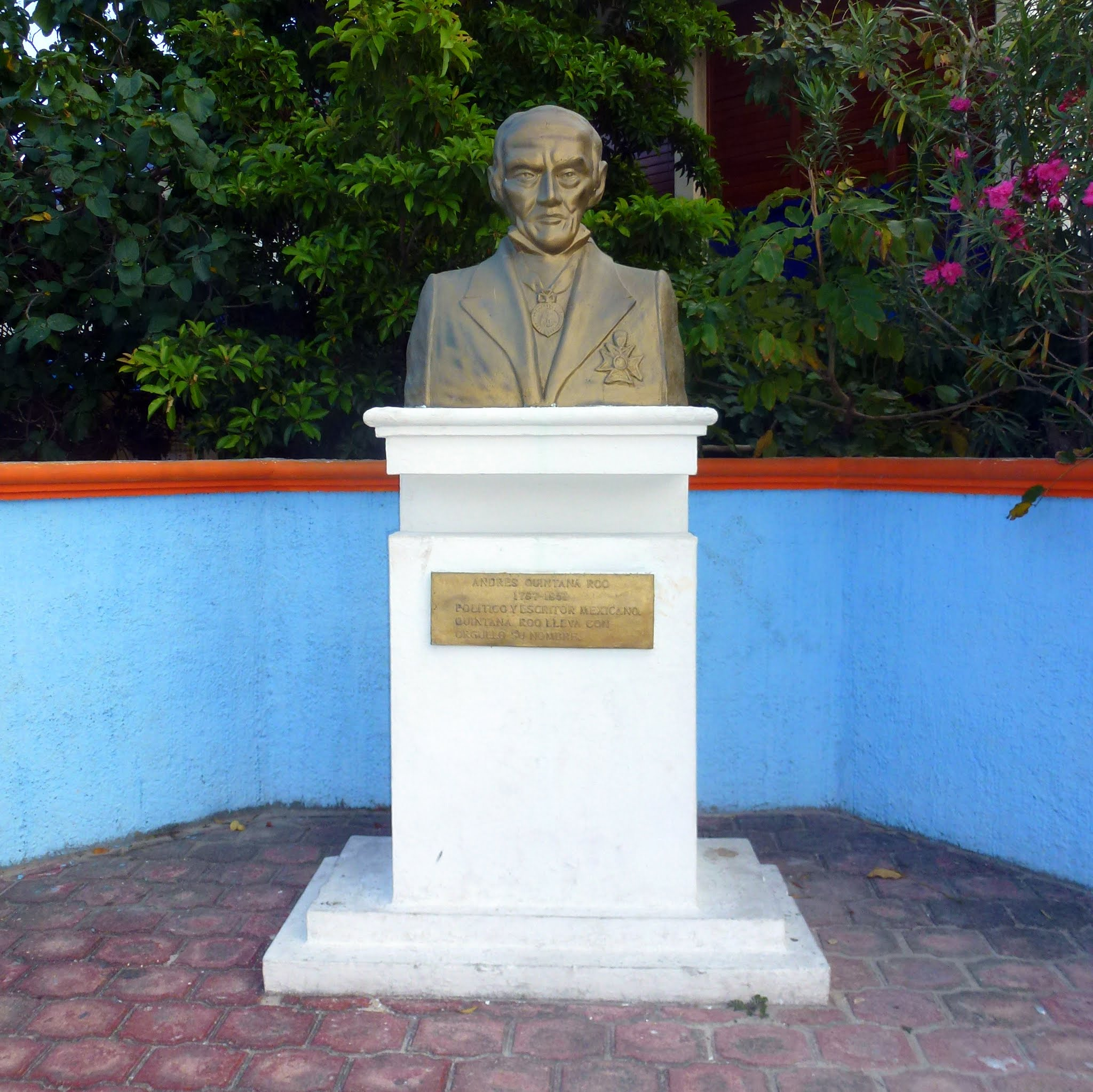
Bust of Quintana Roo in Isla Mujeres, Quintana Roo

== See also ==
- Constitutions of Mexico

== Bibliography ==
- Hernández González, Manuel. La emigración canaria a América. p. 44. First edition, January 2007.
- Rubio Mañé, Jorge Ignacio (1987) Andrés Quintana Roo, ilustre insurgente yucateco (1787–1851). Mexico City, Fondo de Cultura Económica.
