= Zarco =

Zarco may refer to:

== People ==
- João Gonçalves Zarco (c. 1390–1471), Portuguese explorer
- José Morante Zarco (born 1928), Spanish comic artist
- Jorge "El Zarco" Rodríguez (born 1979), Salvadoran football player
- Carlos Romero Zarco (born 1954), Spanish botanist and professor
- Berta Socuéllamos Zarco (born 1963), Spanish actress
- Julián Zarco-Bacas (1887–1936), Spanish historian, librarian, and Catholic priest
- Sergio Zarco Díaz (born 1975), Spanish football coach
- Javier Zarco Ledesma, Mexican international relations expert
- Antonio Remón Zarco del Valle y Huet (1785–1866), Spanish general, engineer, and writer
- Manuel Remón Zarco del Valle (1833–1922), Spanish librarian
- Mariano Remón Zarco del Valle y Balez (1830–1906), Spanish diplomat
- Johann Zarco (born 1990), Grand Prix motorcycle racer from France
- Francisco Zarco (1829–1869), Mexican politician, journalist, and historian
- Teresa Bolaños de Zarco (1922–1998), Guatemalan journalist

== Other uses ==
- Estadio Francisco Zarco, stadium in Durango City, Mexico
- Marquess of Zarco, Spanish noble title
- Praça de Gonçalves Zarco, plaza in Nevogilde, Porto, Portugal
- Presa Francisco Zarco, dam in Lerdo Municipality, Durango, Mexico
- El Zarco, 1900 novel by Mexican author Ignacio Manuel Altamirano
