= Leona Vicario =

Mexican spy and patriot

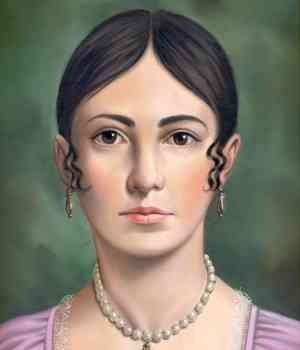
- Leona Vicario de Quintana Roo
- Born: María de la Soledad Leona Camila Vicario Fernández de San Salvador; April 10, 1789; Mexico City, New Spain, Spanish Empire
- Died: August 21, 1842 (aged 53); Mexico City, Mexican Republic
- Burial place: Independence Column
- Spouse: Andrés Quintana Roo

María de la Soledad Leona Camila Vicario Fernández de San Salvador, best known as Leona Vicario (April 10, 1789 – August 21, 1842), was one of the most prominent figures of the Mexican War of Independence. She was dedicated to informing insurgents of movements in her home Mexico City, the capital of the viceroyalty. She was a member of Los Guadalupes, one of the earliest independence movements in New Spain. She financed the rebellion with her large fortune. She was one of the first female journalists in Mexico. She reportedly took many risks and sacrificed much wealth in the name of liberation.

Vicario has been given the title "Distinguished and Beloved Mother of the Homeland" by the Congress of the Union. Her name is inscribed in gold in the Mural of Honor in the lower house of the Mexican Congress. 2020 was declared the "Year of Leona Vicario, Benemérita (Praiseworthy) Madre (Mother) de la Patria (of the Motherland).

== Biography ==
Leona Vicario was an only child, the daughter of a wealthy businessman from Castilla la Vieja, Spain. Her mother was Camila Fernandez de San Salvador, from Toluca. Leona acquired an extensive education in the sciences, fine arts, painting, singing, and literature.

Upon the death of her parents in 1807, she remained in the custody of her uncle and legal guardian Agustín Pomposo Fernández de San Salvador, a well-known lawyer from Mexico City and an enthusiastic supporter of the Spanish crown. Her uncle allowed her to live alone but bought a property adjacent to hers, something scandalous in the custom of the time. Her uncle arranged an engagement to Octaviano Obregon, a lawyer and colonel, but he was sent to Spain as a deputy to the Cortes of Cádiz.

Following her liberal political ideas—and despite her tutor's pro-royalist leanings—Leona soon began to be in contact with groups that advocated—and eventually began to fight for—Mexico's independence. In 1809 Leona met Andrés Quintana Roo, whom she would later marry in 1815. Quintana Roo was also an important figure in the Mexican independence process.

She worked with a secret society called Los Guadalupes to receive and distribute insurgent correspondence for the independence movement. She served as a messenger, helped fugitives, sent money and medicine, and helped in all she could. Leona also had an important role as a propagandist of insurgent ideas. In 1812 she persuaded some of the armourers of Vizcaya to take the side of the rebels.

She fled her home in 1813, because her insurgent activities were discovered. Fernández de San Salvador convinced her to return, and she was detained and questioned in the College of Belén, but refused to inform on the conspirators. The insurgents rescued her, but the authorities confiscated her property. She was, however, granted a pension by the insurgent Congress. She married Quintana Roo and they fled from the authorities together.

From 1813 to 1819 the couple travelled from one place to another working for the Independence and living a life of poverty and sacrifice. During this time, Leona collaborated with the newspapers "El Ilustrador Americano" and "Semanario Patriótico Americano".

They were discovered in 1817; both accepted amnesty from the royalists and stayed in the city of Toluca until 1821, the year of Mexico's Independence.

Leona Vicario and her husband are buried together at Independence Column in Mexico City. She was named the "Sweet Mother of the Motherland" (Benemerita y Dulcisima Madre de la Patria) by a special commission ordered by then President Antonio López de Santa Anna in August 1842, only days after her death. She was buried in Mexico City and is the only civilian woman to have received a State Funeral.

In 1910, Leona Vicario and Josefa Ortiz de Domínguez were the first women to be depicted on Mexican stamps and the second women to be depicted on stamps in Latin America.

In February 2010, seven months before Mexico celebrated its 200 years of independence, Mexican writer Carlos Pascual published the novel "La Insurgenta." In this novel, in which he uses historical facts and fictional events, Pascual tells the story of Leona Vicario as well as the story of many others who participated in the war for and against Mexican independence from the Spanish Empire. Vicario, Leona (1789–1842)

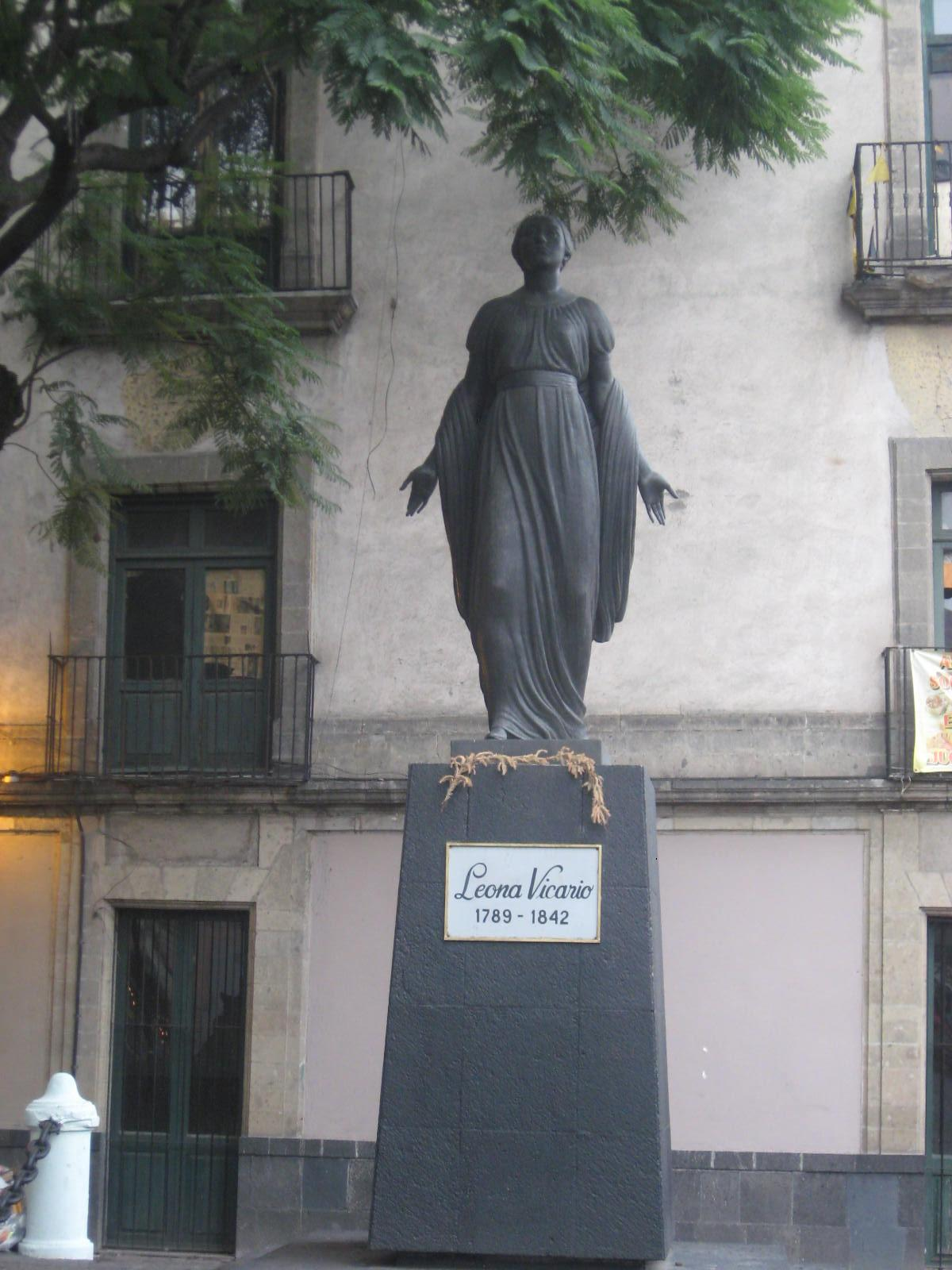
Statue of Leona Vicario located at a plaza on the corner of Republica de Brasil and Republica de Nicaragua in the historic center of Mexico City.

Her profile also appears on a version of the $5 Mexican coin, surrounded by the words "BICENTARIO DE LA INDEPENDENCIA", meaning "Bicentennial Anniversary of Independence."
