= Andrés Cavo =

Mexican historian

Andrés Cavo, SJ (1739, Guadalajara – 1803, Rome) was a Jesuit and historian of New Spain. His Historia de México, completed in exile in Rome, was "the first attempt of a general history of the period of Spanish domination in Mexico" and provided information for future historians of Mexico.

== Life and career ==
Andrés Cavo was born in New Spain in 1739 in the thriving city of Guadalajara and educated in a Jesuit colegio there. He entered the Society of Jesus in 1758 in Tepozotlan and became a priest in 1760. He was involved in the missions to the Indians in Nayarit in 1764, where he was based in the mission of Santísima Trinidad. In 1767 when the order for the expulsion of the Jesuits was enforced, he sailed first to Spain and then relocated to Italy, where he spent the rest of his life, never being able to return to New Spain. According to J. Benedict Warren, in the hope of being permitted to return to his native land, he dissociated himself from the Jesuits, but the permission was not granted."

At his death in 1803 he left a manuscript of his work Historia civil y política de México (Civil and Political History of Mexico), in Latin and Spanish. Carlos María de Bustamante found the manuscript in the library of the bishop of Tanagra. Bustamante published it with a large appendix, under the title Los tres siglos de México bajo el gobierno español hasta la entrada del Ejécito Trigarante (Three Centuries of Mexico Under the Spanish Government). The first edition was published in Mexico City in four volumes in 1836-1838. The first two volumes of Bustamante's edition are Cavo's history from the conquest to 1766, the year before the expulsion of the Jesuits. Bustamante added two volumes, bringing the history up to 1821, when Mexico achieved its independence.

Cavo's work begins in 1521 and ends in 1766, with the end of the government of Viceroy Joaquín de Montserrat, marqués de Cruillas. Thus it does not cover the expulsion of the Jesuits, which happened the following year. Bustamante's Suplemento continues the work up to 1821 and adds a number of important documents.

Three later editions were published, in 1852 in Mexico City, in 1870 in Jalapa, and by the University of Texas in 1949. This latter edition was carefully edited by Ernesto P. Burrus, S.J. and published under the title Historia de México.

The work is not a history in the usual sense. It is better described as the annals of Mexico City, with particular emphasis on the development of political ideas. The book also contains details of colonial life that are not available in any other source. Cavo shows signs of Mexican (not Spanish colonial) nationality, and for this reason is considered a forerunner of Mexican independence.
