= Mateos =

Mateos is a Spanish surname and Albanian and Ethiopian given name. Notable people with the name include:

== Surname ==
- Adolfo López Mateos (1910–1969), President of Mexico from 1958 to 1964
- Adrián Mateos (born 1994), Spanish poker player
- Antonio Mateos, set decorator
- David Mateos Ramajo (born 1987), Spanish footballer
- Diego Corrientes Mateos (1757–1781), Spanish bandit famous for his generosity to the poor
- Enrique Mateos (1934–2001), Spanish footballer
- Gerardo Ruiz Mateos, Mexican engineer and politician
- José María Ruiz Mateos (1931–2015), Spanish businessman
- Julián Mateos (1938–1996), Spanish actor and film producer
- Marta Mateos (born 1984), Spanish football striker
- Miguel Mateos (born 1953), Argentine rock and pop music singer/songwriter
- Pilar Mateos (Valladolid, born 1942), Spanish writer of Children's literature
- Raúl Fernández-Cavada Mateos (born 1988), Spanish footballer
- Roberto Mateos (born 1963), Mexican actor of telenovelas
- Yolanda Mateos (born 1972), Spanish former footballer

== Given name ==
- Mateos Toçi (born 1993), Albanian footballer

== See also ==
- Ciudad López Mateos, city in the State of México, México and the seat of the municipality called Atizapán de Zaragoza
- Mateo (disambiguation)
