= Carlos María de Bustamante =

Mexican statesman, historian and journalist

Carlos María de Bustamante Merecilla
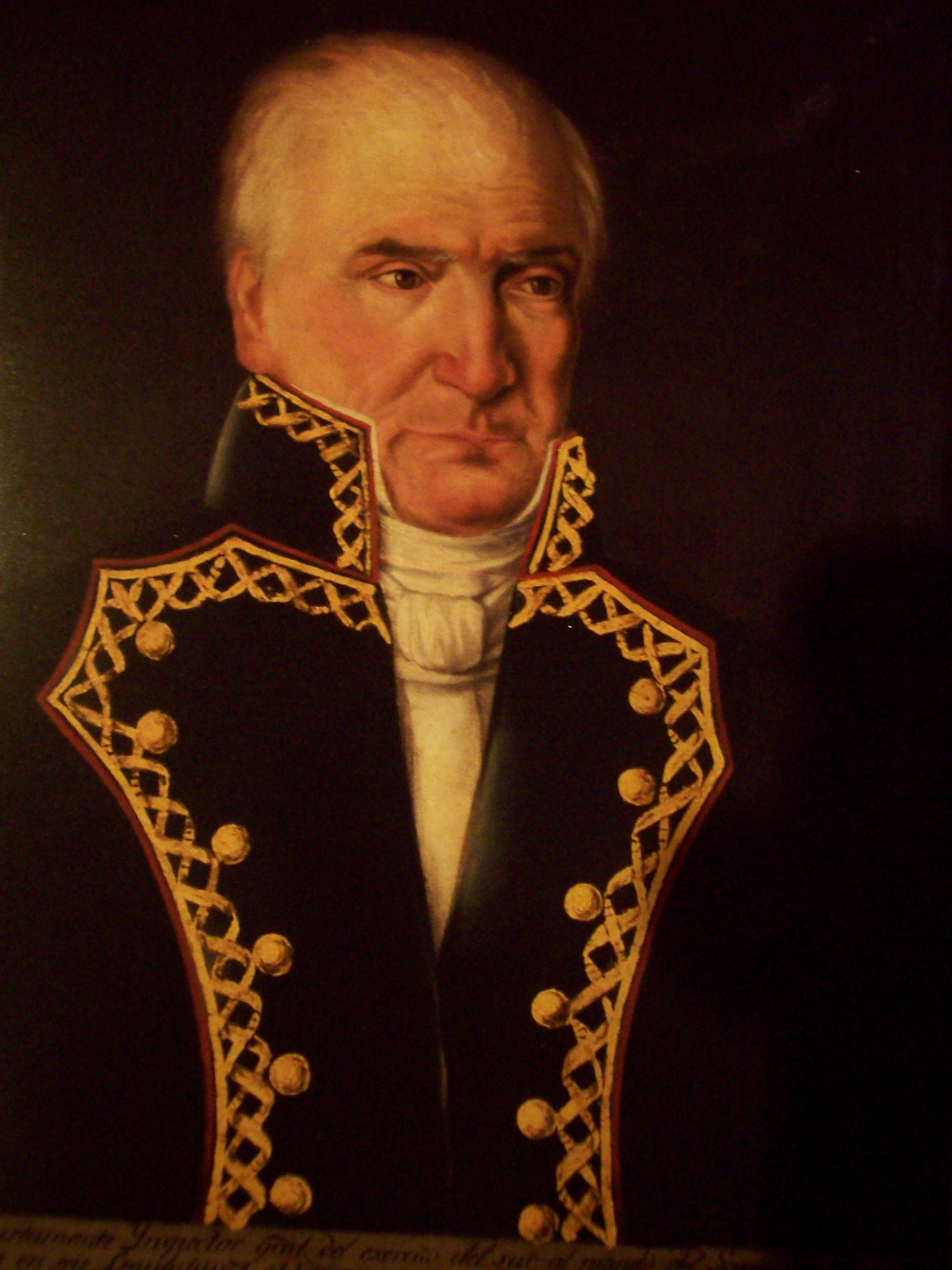
- Portrait of Bustamante, circa 1836. Unknown artist.

Deputy of the Province of Mexico
- In office 1813–1815

Personal details
- Born: 4 November 1774 Oaxaca, New Spain
- Died: 29 September 1848 (aged 73) Mexico City, Mexico
- Occupation: Statesman, historian, journalist

Carlos María de Bustamante Merecilla (4 November 1774 – 29 September 1848) was a Mexican statesman, historian, journalist who played a political and intellectual role in support of Mexican independence, both before and during the Mexican War of Independence.

From independence up until his death in 1848, Bustamante would participate in every Mexican congress.

He played a role in developing a nascent Mexican patriotism and his historical "work early initiated an important Mexican national tradition of searching out and publishing basic materials on the Indian past and its fate in the colonial period." His writings in the 1820s shifted "the antiquarian bias of creole patriotism...into the ideology of a national liberation movement."

== Biography ==
Carlos María de Bustamante was born in the city of Oaxaca on 4 November 1774. In 1796 he took up the study of law, and eventually joined the movement for Mexican independence.

In 1805, during the last years of Spanish colonial rule, he founded the Mexican newspaper Diario de México which he expressed liberal, pro-independence ideas, and was repeatedly imprisoned over it. The Mexican War of Independence finally broke out in 1810. After the liberal Cádiz constitution, granted New Spain limited autonomy, Bustamante founded the newspaper El Juguetillo and continued to agitate for full independence.

In 1813 José María Morelos, leader of the Mexican insurgency named him as editor in the independence newspaper Correo Americano del Sur. That same year, Morelos organized the Congress of Chilpancingo in which Bustamante participated as a deputy, also writing Morelos' opening speech to the congress which "declared that the insurgents were about to free Mexicans from the chains of serfdom imposed on them in 1521." The congress would go on to draft the Constitution of Apatzingán, the first constitution for Mexico, establishing an independent, republican form of government, but it would never be implemented as the tide of war turned against Morelos.

When Mexican independence was finally achieved in 1821, Bustamante was elected as a deputy from Oaxaca to the Mexican Congress. He opposed Agustín de Iturbide's ascencion to the newly established throne of the First Mexican Empire. Bustamante was one of the deputies imprisoned by Iturbide. However, the Empire however proved ephemeral, with Iturbide's reign lasting less than a year. Bustamante subsequently participated in the writing of 1824 Constitution of Mexico.

In 1846, as President Mariano Paredes's perceived sympathies towards establishing a monarchy in Mexico caused a public uproar, Bustamante began to publish a newsletter titled Mexico no quiere rey y menos a un extranjero, (Mexico doesn't want a king, let alone a foreign one).

The Mexican-American War was a source of deep grief to him, and he died shortly after its conclusion in 1848.

== Works ==
His historical sketch of the Mexican-American War is a sad record of the decay and disintegration which afflicted Mexico at the time. He writes with the greatest frankness, and unsparingly, about the conduct of the war on the Mexican side. His autobiography Lo que se dice, y lo que se hace, 1833, published in 1833, is also valuable as a fragment of contemporary history.

Although constantly concerned in the politics of Mexico and occupying several very responsible positions during the most trying times of the Mexican Republic until the close of the war with the United States, Bustamante became a prominent Mexican historian. He distinguished himself by publishing historical works on colonial times, until then in manuscript and partly forgotten. Above all, his publication of Historia general de las cosas de Nueva España, by Fray Bernardino de Sahagún of the second half of the 16th century, was a service to historical research.

In addition to the work of Sahagún, Bustamante printed the chronicle of Gómara, the work of Veytia on Tezcuco, the dissertations of Gama on two large Mexican sculptures, and others. To the history by Sahagún he added one of the relaciones of Fernando de Alva Ixtlilxóchitl, selected by him for the passionate spirit which it displays against the Spaniards. Bustamante found the manuscript of exiled Mexican Jesuit Andrés Cavo, Historia civil y política de México (Civil and Political History of Mexico), in Latin and Spanish. Bustamante published it with a large appendix, under the title Los tres siglos de México bajo el gobierno español hasta la entrada del Ejécito Trigarante (Three Centuries of Mexico Under the Spanish Government until the entry of the Army of the Three Guarantees). The first edition was published in Mexico City in four volumes in 1836-1838. Bustamante also published a portion of Mariano Veytia's Historia antigua de México, which Veytia based on manuscripts collected by Lorenzo Boturini Benaduci. Bustamante also published in defective form the eighteenth-century writings of Hipólito Villaroel, who wrote about the Spanish treatment of Indians, the colonial power structure regarding the Indians, and the "Indian problem" in Mexico.

In addition to the autobiography mentioned, and the light shed by his other works, the Diccionario universal de Historia y Geografía (Mexico, 1853), contains an exhaustive account of the man. The historian Lucas Alamán wrote biographical material on Bustamante, putting in relief especially his private character and the virtues of his domestic life.

== Writings ==
- Galería de antiguos príncipes mexicanos. Puebla 1821
- Crónica mexicana, Teoamoxtli ó libro que tiene todo lo interesante á usos, costumbres, religión, política y literatura de los antiguos indios tultecas y mexicanos, redactado de un antiguo códice del caballero Boturini. Mexico. Mexico 1822.
- Necesidad de a unión de todos los megicanos [sic] contra las asechanzas de la nación española y liga europea, comprobado con la historia de la antigua República de Tlaxcala. Mexico 1826.
- Mañanas de a alameda de México; publicadas para facilitar a las señoritas el estudio de a historia de su país. 2 vols. Mexico 1835-36.
- Hay tiempos de hablar y tiempos de callar. Mexico 1833. [Autobiography to 1833]
- Apuntes para la historia del gobierno del general Antonio López de Santa Anna
- Cuadro histórico de la revolución de la América Mejicana

=== Edited sources ===
- Historia de las conquistas de Hernando Cortés escrita en español por Francisco López de Gómara, traducida al mexicano por Juan Bautista de San Anton Muñon Chimalpahin quauhtlehuantzin, indio mexicano. 2 vols. Mexico. 1826.
- Memoria sobre la guerra del Mixtón en el estado de Jalisco. 1826.
- Tezcoco en los últimos tiempos de sus antiguos reyes, ó sea relación tomada de los manuscritos inéditos de Boturini; redactada por el Lic. por el Lic. D. Mariano Veytia. Publicados con notes y adiciones para el estudio de a juventud mexicana. 292 pp. 1826.
- Historia del descubrimiento de la América Septentrional por Cristóbal Colón, escrita por el P. Fr. Manuel de la Vega, religioso franciscano de la provincia de México. 250 pp. Mexico. 1826.
- Historia de la conquista de México por el P. Fr. Bernardino de Sahagún. 1829.
- Horribles crueldades de los conquistadores de México y los indios que los auxiliaron, para subyugarlo a la corona de Castilla, ó sea Memoria por D. Fernando de Ixtlilxochitl. 1829.
- Historia general de las cosas de la Nueva España, que en doce libros y dos volúmenes, escribieron por el R. P. Fr. Bernardino de Sahagún, de la observancia de S. Francisco, y uno de los primeros predicadores del Santo Evangelio de aquellas regiones. 3 vols. Mexico 1829-30.
- Descripción histórica y cronológica de las dos piedras, que son ocasión del nuevo empredrado que se está formando en la plaza principal de México, se hallaron en ella el año de 1790, por D. Antonio de León y Gama. Mexico 1832.
