= Public holidays in Mexico =

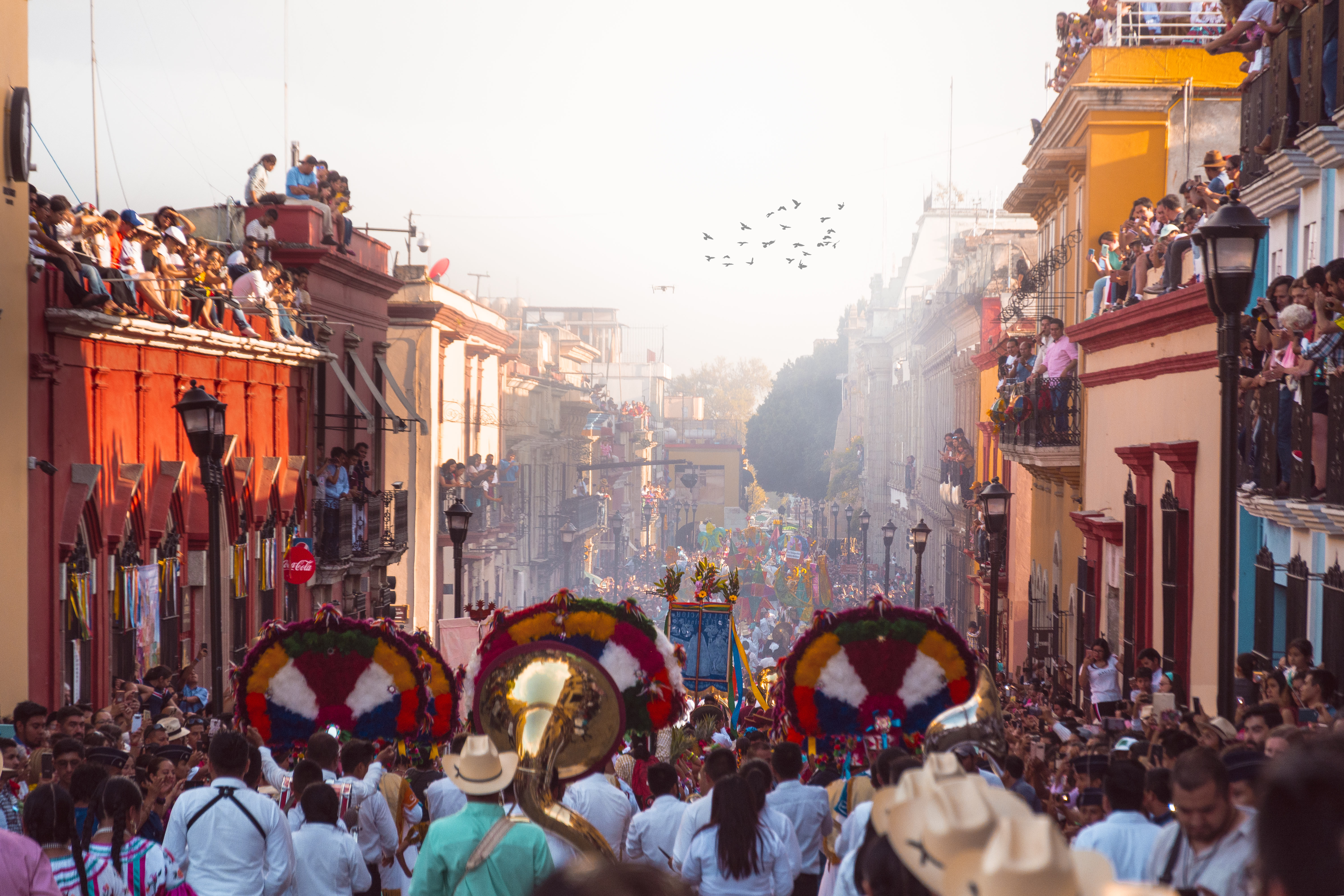
A Guelaguetza celebration in Oaxaca

In Mexico, there are three major kinds of public holidays:

- Statutory holiday: holidays observed all around Mexico. Employees are entitled to a day off with regular pay and schools (public and private) are closed for the day of the holiday.
- Civic holiday: These holidays are observed nationwide, but employees are not entitled to the day off with pay, and schools (public and private) still continue.
- Festivities: These are traditional holidays to honor religious events, such as Carnival, Holy Week, Easter, etc. or public celebrations, such as Mother's Day, Father's Day, Valentine's Day, etc.

Dia de la Independencia or Anniversario de la Independencia, September 16, commemorates Mexico's independence from Spain and is the most important patriotic statutory holiday. Parades are held and many schools are closed.

== Statutory holidays ==
Statutory holidays (referred as "feriados" or "días de asueto" in Mexico) are legislated through the federal government and ruled by the Federal Labor Law (Ley Federal del Trabajo). Most workers, public and private, are entitled to take the day off with regular pay. However, some employers may require employees to work on such a holiday, but the employee must be paid:

- the regular pay for the statutory holiday if no work is performed by the employee, and
- the regular pay and two additional daily salary rates if work is performed by the employee, for a total of triple the usual rate.

When a statutory holiday falls on a Sunday, Monday is considered a statutory holiday; if a statutory holiday falls on Saturday, Friday will be considered a statutory holiday.

Date	English name	Spanish name	Observance	Remarks
January 1	New Year's Day	Año Nuevo	On date	First day of the year.
February 5	Constitution Day	Día de la Constitución	First Monday of February	
March 21	Benito Juárez's Birthday	Natalicio de Benito Juárez	Third Monday of March	
May 1	Labour Day	Día del Trabajo	On date	Established in 1923, Labor Day commemorates the Mexican workers' union movements. (See also Patriotic holidays in Mexico).
September 16	Independence Day	Día de la Independencia	On date	Commemorates the start of the Independence War by Priest Miguel Hidalgo y Costilla in 1810. Festivities begin the evening of September 15 and culminate with a military parade on September 16. (See also Patriotic holidays in Mexico).
November 20	Revolution Day	Día de la Revolución	Third Monday of November	
December 25	Christmas Day	Navidad	On date	Christmas celebration; secular and religious holiday.

In addition to these dates, election days designated by federal and local electoral laws are also statutory holidays.

== Civic holidays ==
Date	English name	Spanish name	Remarks
February 19	Mexican Army Day	Día del Ejército	Celebrates the Mexican Army on the date of its 1913 foundation and honor of the 1911 Loyalty March ("Marcha de la Lealtad"), when President Madero was escorted by the Cadets of the Military College to the National Palace.
February 24	Flag Day	Día de la Bandera	Celebrates the current Flag of Mexico and honors the previous ones. Flag Day was implemented by President Lázaro Cárdenas in 1937.
March 18	Anniversary of the Oil Expropriation	Aniversario de la Expropiación petrolera	Celebrates the Oil Expropriation by President General Lázaro Cárdenas in 1938.
April 21	Heroic Defense of Veracruz	Heroica Defensa de Veracruz	Commemorates the defense against the United States occupation of Veracruz in 1914 by cadets, staff and faculty of the Heroica Escuela Naval Militar and personnel of the Mexican Navy.
May 5	Fifth of May	Cinco de Mayo	Celebrates the victory of the Mexican Army, led by Gral. Ignacio Zaragoza against French forces in the city of Puebla, on May 5, 1862. Also widely celebrated in the United States.
May 8	Miguel Hidalgo's birthday	Natalicio de Miguel Hidalgo	Commemorates the birth in 1753 of Miguel Hidalgo y Costilla, the initiator of the Mexican Independence War.
June 1	National Maritime Day	Día de la Marina	Honors the merchant marines, which began on June 1, 1917 with the Tabasco. The holiday was first celebrated in 1942 to honor the crews of the Potrero del Llano and Faja de Oro, whose ships were sunk by Nazi submarines in May 1942.
September 13	Anniversary of the "Boy Heroes" or "Heroic Cadets"	Día de los Niños Héroes	Celebrates the Battle of Chapultepec during the Mexican–American War of 1847 and the heroic and ultimate sacrifice that the Niños Héroes gave for the nation.
September 16	Cry of Dolores	Grito de Dolores	Celebrates the Grito de Dolores, an event that marked the start of the independence war against Spain on the eve of September 16, 1810. It took place at a church chapel in Dolores Hidalgo, Guanajuato, led by a Creole Catholic priest Miguel Hidalgo y Costilla. Families and friends gather the evening of September 15 for a Noche Mexicana, dressing in traditional clothes and consuming traditional foods and drinks such as pozole, mole, birria, beer, tequila, and/or mezcal. The President rings the bell of Hidalgo and crowds gather in the Zócalo of Mexico City to shout ¡Viva México! (Long live Mexico!). Similar ceremonies are held in every state and municipality across the country. A military parade is held in Mexico City on September 16. See also Fiestas Patrias (Mexico).
September 27	Culmination of the Mexican War of Independence	Consumación de la Independencia	Celebrates the end of the Mexican Independence War in 1821, 11 years after Father Hidalgo started it, with the victory of the Army of the Three Guarantees, led by Agustín de Iturbide and Vicente Guerrero.
September 30	Morelos' birthday	Natalicio de José Mª Morelos y Pavón	Commemorates the birth in 1765 of Father José María Morelos y Pavón, one of the founding fathers of the Mexican nation.
October 12	Day of the Pluricultural Nation	Día de la Nación Pluricultural	Commemorates and promotes the many coexisting cultures, languages, and ethnicities in Mexico.
November 23	Mexican Navy Day	Dia de la Armada de Mexico	Celebrating the 1825 capture of the San Juan de Ulúa Fortress in Veracruz led by a joint force of Mexican Army and Navy units (the capture of the fortress is the Navy's baptism of fire, on which its first fleet under Captain Pedro Sainz de Baranda served with distinction).

== Festivities ==
Date	English name	Spanish name	Remarks
January 6	Epiphany	Día de los Reyes Magos	Celebrates the Biblical New Testament story of the arrival of the three wise men who each brought a gift to the Christ child. Traditionally, children receive toys, and people buy a pastry called rosca de reyes. Anyone who bites into the bread and finds a figurine of the Christ child must host a party for the Day of Candlemas (February 2). It is not a state holiday.
February 2	Candlemas	Día de la Candelaria	Celebrates the presentation of the baby Jesus in the Temple of Jerusalem 40 days after his birth. Traditionally, women bring a representation (i.e. statue/doll) of the baby Jesus in new clothes to be blessed by the parish priest. Afterwards, a meal of tamales and hot chocolate is given by the person who found the baby Jesus figure in the Rosca de Reyes (see above in Epiphany). It is not a state holiday.
Thursday to Tuesday before Ash Wednesday	Carnival	Carnaval	In addition to costumes, music, and dancing, Carnaval celebrations often include amusement rides, bull riding, or Charreadas (rodeos). The largest carnavales are in Mazatlán and Veracruz. While most carnivals are held during the week before Lent, they can be held at any time of the year.
February 14	Valentine's Day	Día del Amor y la Amistad	Celebrates amorous unions. On this day, traditionally, people give chocolates, flowers, letters and gifts to their friends, relatives and couples. It is not a state holiday.
March 8	International Women's Day	Día Internacional de la Mujer	It is not a state holiday.
March or April	Holy Thursday	Jueves Santo	Commemorates the Last Supper of Christ. Government offices, schools, and many businesses close; many families celebrate it as a secular holiday. Many families visit the beaches. It is not a state holiday.
March or April	Good Friday	Viernes Santo	Commemorates the Crucifixion of Jesus. Government offices, schools, and many businesses close; many families celebrate it as a secular holiday. Many families visit the beaches. It is not a state holiday.
April 30	Children's Day	Día del Niño	Honors all the children. It is not a state holiday.
May 10	Mother's Day	Día de las Madres	Honors all the mothers throughout the country. It is not a state holiday.
May 15	Teacher's Day	Día del Maestro	Honors all the teachers throughout the country. It is often celebrated on the Monday before May 15. It is not a state holiday.
May 23	Students' Day	Día del estudiante	Honors all the students throughout the country. It is not a state holiday.
Third Sunday of June	Father's Day	Día del Padre	Honors all the fathers throughout the country. It is not a state holiday.
November 1	All Saints' Day (Day of the Dead)	Día de Todos los Santos (Día de Muertos)	Honors dead relatives and friends (who were under 18 years of age and unmarried) with candles, food and flower offerings, altars, and pre-Columbian and Christian rituals. It is not a state holiday.
November 2	All Souls' Day (Day of the Dead)	Día de los Fieles Difuntos (Día de Muertos)	Honors dead relatives and friends (who were 18 years of age or married) with candles, food and flower offerings, altars, and pre-Columbian and Christian rituals. It is not a state holiday.
December 12	Feast of Our Lady of Guadalupe	Día de la Virgen de Guadalupe	Celebrates the day that Our Lady of Guadalupe appeared on Tepeyac hill to the native San Juan Diego Cuauhtlatoatzin. It is not a state holiday.
December 16–24	Las Posadas	Las Posadas	Commemorates the Biblical New Testament story of Joseph and Mary's search for shelter in Bethlehem. Consists of candlelight processions as well as stops at various nativity scenes. Children break piñatas and people drink ponche ((in English) "punch"). Many businesses hold a posada (meaning "inn" in English) as a year-end Christmas party for their employees.
December 24	Christmas Eve	Nochebuena	Celebrates the eve of the nativity of Jesus, as both a secular and religious winter holiday. The traditional treats for this holiday are buñuelos, tamales and atole or champurrado. Sometimes they eat gelatina de colores (different flavors of Jell-O and a milk-based Jell-O mixed together to make a colorful treat) Las Posadas are celebrated nine days before Nochebuena, usually accompanied by a piñata party for children and dance music for adults. Many families feast, with pozole or turkey as common dishes.
December 25	Christmas	Navidad	Christmas celebration; secular and religious holiday. Government offices, schools, and most business close from December 25 to January 1, and many people go on vacation to visit relatives or enjoy the beach.
December 28	Holy Innocents Day	Día de los Santos Inocentes	On this day, people pull practical jokes on each other. It is equivalent to the U.S. version of April Fools' Day (April 1). People must not believe anything that other people say nor let them borrow any amount of money. If any person has fallen victim of the joke, the person pulling the joke will say ¡Inocente palomita...!, literally meaning 'Innocent little dove..!!!' (equivalent to saying April Fools!).
December 31	New Year's Eve	Víspera de Año Nuevo	Mexicans celebrate New Year's Eve or locally known as Año Nuevo, by downing a grape with each of the twelve chimes of the bell during the midnight countdown, while making a wish with each one. Mexican families decorate homes and parties, during New Year's, with colors such as red, to encourage an overall improvement of lifestyle and love, yellow to encourage blessings of improved employment conditions, green to improve financial circumstances and white to improved health. Mexican sweet bread is baked with a coin or charm hidden in the dough. When the bread is served, the recipient whose slice contains the coin or charm is believed to be blessed with good luck in the new year. Another tradition is making a list of all the bad or unhappy events from the current year; before midnight, this list is thrown into a fire, symbolizing the removal of negative energy from the new year. At the same time, thanks is expressed for all the good things had during the year that is coming to its end so that they will continue to be had in the new year. Mexicans celebrate by having a dinner with their families, the traditional meal being turkey and mole, a tradition which has now spanned worldwide. Those who want to party generally go out afterwards, to local parties or night clubs. If you're in Mexico, you can still enjoy festivities in the street. In Mexico City there is a huge street festival on New Year's Eve; celebrations center around the Zocalo, the city's main square. One can expect a lot of firecrackers, fireworks and sparklers being fired. At midnight there is a lot of noise and everyone shouts: "Feliz año nuevo!" People embrace, make noise, set off firecrackers, and sing.

== Dates of observance for moveable holidays ==
- 2020
  - February 3 – Constitution Day
  - March 16 – Benito Juarez's Birthday (Note: Celebrations after this date were generally low-key due to the COVID-19 pandemic in Mexico.)
  - April 9 – Holy Thursday
  - April 10 – Good Friday
  - June 21 – Father's Day
  - November 16 – Revolution Day
- 2021
  - February 1 – Constitution Day
  - February 14 – Carnaval
  - March 15 – Benito Juarez's Birthday
  - April 1 – Holy Thursday
  - April 2 – Good Friday
  - June 20 – Father's Day
  - November 15 – Revolution Day
- 2022
  - February 7 – Constitution Day
  - February 27 – Carnaval
  - March 21 – Benito Juarez's Birthday
  - April 10 – Holy Week begins
  - April 14 – Holy Thursday
  - April 15 – Good Friday
  - June 19 – Father's Day
  - November 21 – Revolution Day
- 2023
  - February 6 – Constitution Day
  - February 19 – Carnaval
  - March 20 – Benito Juarez's Birthday
  - April 2 – Holy Week begins
  - April 6 – Holy Thursday
  - April 7 – Good Friday
  - June 18 – Father's Day
  - November 20 – Revolution Day
- 2024
  - February 5 – Constitution Day
  - February 11 – Carnaval
  - March 18 – Benito Juarez's Birthday
  - March 24 – Holy Week begins
  - March 28 – Holy Thursday
  - March 29 – Good Friday
  - June 2 or July 7 – 2024 General election in Mexico
  - June 16 – Father's Day
  - October 1 – Presidential Inauguration Day
  - November 18 – Revolution Day
- 2025
  - February 3 – Constitution Day
  - March 2 – Carnaval
  - March 17 – Benito Juarez's Birthday
  - April 13 – Holy Week begins
  - April 17 – Holy Thursday
  - April 18 – Good Friday
  - June 15 – Father's Day
  - November 17 – Revolution Day
- 2026
  - February 2 – Constitution Day
  - February 15 – Carnaval
  - March 16 – Benito Juarez's Birthday
  - March 29 – Holy Week begins
  - April 2 – Holy Thursday
  - April 3 – Good Friday
  - June 21 – Father's Day
  - November 16 – Revolution Day
- 2027
  - February 1 – Constitution Day
  - February 7 – Carnaval
  - March 15 – Benito Juarez's Birthday
  - March 21 – Holy Week begins
  - March 25 – Holy Thursday
  - March 26 – Good Friday
  - June 6 or July 4 - 2027 General election in Mexico
  - June 20 – Father's Day
  - November 15 – Revolution Day
- 2028
  - February 7 – Constitution Day
  - February 27 – Carnaval
  - March 20 – Benito Juarez's Birthday
  - April 9 – Holy Week begins
  - April 13 – Holy Thursday
  - April 14 – Good Friday
  - June 18 – Father's Day
  - November 20 – Revolution Day
- 2029
  - February 5 – Constitution Day
  - February 11 – Carnaval
  - March 19 – Benito Juarez's Birthday
  - March 25 – Holy Week begins
  - March 29 – Holy Thursday
  - March 30 – Good Friday
  - June 17 – Father's Day
  - November 19 – Revolution Day

== See also ==
- Flag flying days in Mexico
- Christmas in Mexico
- Holy Week in Mexico
- Depor; Depor, Redacción (2022-10-05). "Halloween 2022 en México: ¿cuándo empieza, por qué se celebra y cuál es su significado?". Depor (in Mexican Spanish).
