= History of the flags of Mexico =

History of Mexico

Bandera de la Nueva España.

The history of the flags of Mexico began before the Spanish conquest of the Aztec Empire, with the Flag Bearers of the Mexicas. The tri-coloured stripes date back to 1821. The green represents hope and victory, white stands for the purity of Mexican ideals and red represents the blood shed by the nation's martyrs. The modern day Flag of Mexico was adopted in 1968.

== History ==
The conquistador Hernán Cortés used a banner of conquest in 1521, the banner is represented with the bust of the Virgin Mary.

The flag was painted on a red damask, wearing a golden crown accompanied by rays and twelve stars forming a semicircle on his head. As of August 13, 1528, the day of San Hipólito, Cortés ordered that the "Paseo del Pendón" be verified annually. The Paseo del Pendón was a kind of official flag festival, taking a tour of the main streets of the city and ending in the church of San Hipólito. The Royal Banner was carried by an ensign of the Colonial Guard mounted on horseback, and behind him, in hierarchical order, followed the nobility, oidores, military officers, and lastly, the people in general.

Several of these banners were used as flags during the time of the viceroyalty.

The latter, which prevailed until 24 August 1821, the date on which Agustín de Iturbide and the last viceroy of New Spain signed the treaty declaring Mexico an independent nation, was square in shape, of a tawny brown color, and from the center and towards the corners the Cross of San Andrés started, with reeled arms and purple. At each of the ends of the cross finished off a shield of Mexico City, with crowned lions, and on each of the shields a royal crown.

The Banner of Guadalupe.

Flag of Hidalgo

On Sunday, 16 September 1810, Miguel Hidalgo y Costilla, the initiator of the Mexican War of Independence, took from the sacristy of the parish of Atotonilco el Grande, in the State of Guanajuato, an oil painting representing the image of the Virgin of Guadalupe. This banner would be the flag in the fight for independence that the insurgents were going to undertake. The Virgin Guadalupana was taken as a protector because she was the mestizo virgin and to make the insurgents feel that her fight was not condemned by her religion.

José María Morelos y Pavón used a rectangular-shaped flag with a pale blue background and another white rectangle in the center in his campaign against the royalists. In the same place stood out a bridge of three letters "VVM" (Long live the Virgin Mary). Resting on the bridge, and passing over it, was a crowned eagle. His position showed half profile.

Already advanced the War of Independence the insurgents used another flag. The banner with the Virgin had a strong religious connotation and therefore it was considered appropriate to replace it. Being before that of Iguala, it also used three colours: white, blue and red. The new flag was displayed on merchant ships that ran along the Gulf coast between Mexico and the United States. Its acceptance was immediate, to the point that in North America it was greeted with 21-gun salutes.

In the year 1821, as a result of the agreement between General Vicente Guerrero and Agustín de Iturbide, the fight for Independence came to an end. After the Plan of Iguala was signed, on 24 February, the two armies were united into one, which received the name of the "Army of the Three Guarantees." The tradition refers that a tailor from Iguala, Don José Magdalena Ocampo, made the first flag flown by this army. The three colours adopted had the following meaning: white, the purity of the Religion; green, Independence; the incarnate, the Union. The colours were placed in the indicated order and the stripes diagonally, each having a star embroidered with gold threads. This flag entered the capital at the head of the Triguarante Army on 24 February 1821.

In April 1823, the deputy Don José Joaquín Herrera suggested adding an oak branch and a laurel branch to the existing flag (that of the Empire) to represent republican Mexico. Don Florencio Martínez proposed, and was accepted, that the Imperial Crown of Mexico be removed. The colours remained since they were considered to be linked to the emotions of the Mexican people.

In 1892 Porfirio Díaz, at that time President of the Republic, decreed modifications to the national flag. Maintaining the colors and the order without altering, the shield presents the eagle in a frontal position, with the wings collected and holding the serpent with the right claw. One can see a laurel branch and an olive branch placed in a semicircle under the cactus. This is how the shield remained until 1917, the year in which it was replaced by its current design.

The Flag of Mexico adopted in 1968.

By the 20th century, President Venustiano Carranza restored the eagle in profile standing on a nopal cactus and holding a rattlesnake in its beak: the image appears bordered by a semicircle of laurel and oak leaves. The flag was first hoisted on 15 September 1915 to symbolise the end of Spanish rule. The modern day flag is based on the 1916 flag.

In 1973, the then president Luis Echeverría ordered a new design, the current one, in which the most slender and upright bird can be seen, with the bristling plume and the wings closer together and the nopal cactus extending horizontally.

It was in 1934 that, through a decree, Flag Day in Mexico began to be commemorated every February 24, but it was not until 1984 that the characteristics of the nation's emblems were recognized and ratified. In this way, the strengthening of the cult and respect for the national patriotic symbols began.

In January 2023, the Flag of Jalisco was officially hoisted for the first time.

== Bibliography ==
- La Colonia.
- Cossío Villegas, Daniel (coord.). Historia General de México. T. I. México: El Colegio de México. pp. 438–450.

== See also ==
- Flag Day in Mexico
