= Fiestas Patrias (Mexico) =

The Fiestas Patrias ("National Holidays") of Mexico, or fiestas patrias mexicanas, are celebrations that commemorate fundamental events that occurred in September, which has led to this month being known as the Mes Patrio ("National Month"). Celebrations include official acts, ceremonies, parades, school activities or popular demonstrations that reinforce the national identity of the events that gave rise to the modern Mexican State.

The four events of the Mes Patrio consist of: Anniversary of the Battle of Chapultepec (September 13), the Grito de Dolores (September 15), Independence Day (September 16) and the Consummation of Independence (September 27).

== History ==
The origin of Fiestas Patrias celebrations in Mexico back to the events of the early morning of September 16, 1810, when Miguel Hidalgo y Costilla issued the call known as the Grito de Dolores ("Cry of Dolores"), considered the beginning of Mexico's struggle for independence from Spanish Crown.

In the years following the independence movement, various governments of the country began to commemorate this date as a symbol of national unity and sovereignty. The first official celebration took place in 1812, during the same armed conflict, when José María Morelos promoted the commemoration of September 16 as a patriotic act in areas under insurgent control. During the administration of Guadalupe Victoria, Mexico's first president, September 16 was officially established as a national holiday. Throughout the 19th century, the date became consolidated as one of the founding symbols of the Mexican state.

During the Porfiriato era, the celebrations took on a more solemn character. As part of his regime, Porfirio Díaz promoted the use of patriotic symbols and reinforced the celebration of the Grito de Independencia ("Cry of Independence") on the night of September 15th. Contrary to popular belief that the decision was based on the coincidence of it being the dictator's birthday, historians assert that this practice had already been observed since 1824, as part of the so-called verbenas (festivals).

Since then, the Fiestas Patrias have evolved to include not only civic and official events, but also cultural expressions that reflect Mexican national identity.

== Celebrations ==
The Fiestas Patrias are held throughout the country with a combination of official ceremonies, civic events, and popular cultural demonstrations. Their purpose is to reinforce historical memory, national identity, and a sense of unity among citizens. Every night of September 15th, the President, usually accompanied by his spouse, appears on the balcony of the National Palace to reenact the famous cry for independence, but this time naming historical figures from the War of Independence, accompanied by the ringing of the Bell of Dolores. The following day, a military parade takes place in the Zócalo, featuring the Army, Navy, and National Guard, and is broadcast by major media outlets.

In September, the presence of national symbols intensifies throughout Mexico. National flag, coat of arms, and national anthem are used in official ceremonies, schools, public buildings, and commercial spaces. The use of the flag's colors (green, white, and red) is ubiquitous; according to modern interpretation, these colors represent esperanza (green), unidad (white), and the sangre de los héroes nacionales (red).

During the celebrations, some genres such as banda music, mariachi, regional music, and Mexican son are played. Folk dance performances showcasing the country's rich cultural heritage are also featured.

Traditional dishes like pozole, chiles en nogada, tamales, and enchiladas play a central role in the celebrations. Some of them, like chiles en nogada, even incorporate the national colors.

=== Outside Mexico ===
As Mexico has historically been one of the largest sources of tourism to the region, the U.S. city of Las Vegas is known for hosting cultural events—including concerts and sporting events—that appeal to Mexicans and Hispanic Americans on and around September.

== In sports ==
Historically, sport has played an important role in Mes Patrio, especially on Independence Day.

Since the early 1990s, boxing cards with main events involving top Mexican boxers have been a fixture of Independence Day weekend in Las Vegas. While U.S.-hosted fights on the weekend date back as far as the 1970s, the tradition of hosting these fights in Las Vegas was first established by Julio César Chávez and his manager Don King, who fought annually during that time of year from 1991 to 1995. All but one of these bouts were held in Las Vegas, with his 1993 fight against Pernell Whitaker occurring at San Antonio's Alamodome instead. The tradition was later taken up by other boxers of Mexican descent, such as Oscar De La Hoya and Canelo Álvarez.

The tradition has also been extended to mixed martial arts, with UFC beginning to host a Las Vegas event on the weekend promoted as Noche UFC beginning with 2023's UFC Fight Night: Grasso vs. Shevchenko 2 (with a main event featuring the promotion's first Mexican women's champion, Alexa Grasso). The Noche UFC event for 2024 would be UFC 306 at Sphere Las Vegas, where all but one of the matches featured at least one fighter of Mexican or Mexican-American descent. The Noche UFC event for 2025 was originally scheduled to be UFC 320 in Guadalajara, Mexico, but its anticipated venue was not completed in time; the event was relocated to the Frost Bank Center in San Antonio as UFC Fight Night: Lopes vs. Silva.

== See also ==
- Flag flying days in Mexico
- Holidays and celebrations in Mexico
