= Coat of arms of Michoacán =

Coat of Arms of Michoacán

The Coat of arms of Michoacán (Spanish: Escudo de Michoacán, lit. "state shield of Michoacán") is a symbol of the Free and Sovereign State of Michoacán.

== Symbolism ==
In the first compartment there is a gules field that denotes strength, victory, daring, the equestrian statue in gold of D. José Ma. Morelos y Pavón, the greatest leader of the struggle for Independence. Gold in heraldry symbolizes nobility, wealth, power, light, constancy and wisdom. The horse, symbol of aggressiveness in war, promptness, lightness, empire and command. It is inspired by the monument of the capital, located in the civic square "Morelos".

In the second compartment there is a gules field, three indigenous royal crowns in gold, symbolizing the three lordships into which Michoacán was divided before the Conquest. When Tariácuri died, he divided his reign into three lordships, which he divided between his son Hiquíngare, who was given Pátzcuaro, and his nephews Tangáxoan and Hiripan, who were given the government of Tzintzuntzan and Ihuatzio respectively. Each crown bears a medallion with the distinctive color of each lordship.

The third compartment there is in natural colors, a gold field with a straight gear, signifying the harmonious union of effort in the ascension of progress; in the background, a diagram of blast furnaces, with a sea in the background, suggesting the vast steel and industrial panorama of Michoacán.

In the fourth field of gold, in natural colors: in the foreground and on a green terrace an open book - source of culture -; in the background, an architectural scheme of the University of Tiripetío, founded in 1540 by Friar Alonso de la Vera Cruz, Friar Diego Chávez y Alvarado and Friar Juan de San Ramón, precursor of the current Michoacana University of San Nicolás de Hidalgo, emporium of national intellectuality.

=== Historical coats ===
The symbol is used by all successive regimes in different forms.

Coat of arms from 1582 to 1979.

Coat of arms from 1979.

== See also ==
- Michoacán
- Coat of arms of Mexico
