= Coat of arms of Oaxaca =

Coat of Arms of Oaxaca

The Coat of arms of Oaxaca (Spanish: Escudo de Oaxaca, lit. "state shield of Oaxaca") is a symbol of the Free and Sovereign State of Oaxaca in Mexico.

== Symbolism ==
It is made up of a red canvas, rolled up at its upper end; inside a white oval the inscription EL RESPETO AL DERECHO AJENO ES LA PAZ (English: Respect for the rights of others is peace) stands out. The words of the motto are separated from each other by symbolic representations of pear. The oval is divided into three parts inside: in the lower part there are two white arms breaking chains, in the upper left the toponym of Huaxyacac composed of: a stylized profile of a native of the state of Oaxaca, the flower and the fruit in a stylized form of the huaje tree; in the upper right the profile of one of the palaces of the archaeological center of Mitla, and flanking this figure to its right, the Dominican Cross. Around the oval there are 7 silver stars: three at the bottom, two to the right and above the oval and two to the left and above. At the bottom of the canvas is the phrase ESTADO LIBRE Y SOBERANO DE OAXACA. The Coat of Arms of Mexico is located on the canvas.

=== Elements ===
Oaxaca was the second Mexican state inside the country to adopt the national shield, on the crest or upper part of the state coat of arms.

The toponym of Huaxyacac: In the 15th century the Mexicas established a camp in this valley which they called Huaxyacac, which in Nahuatl means “At the tip or nose of the huaje”, the origin of the word Oaxaca.

== History ==
It is a design by Alfredo Canseco Feraud who won the contest organized by Eduardo Vasconcelos, governor of the Oaxaca state in the period 1947–1950.

=== Historical coats ===
The symbol is used by all successive regimes in different forms.

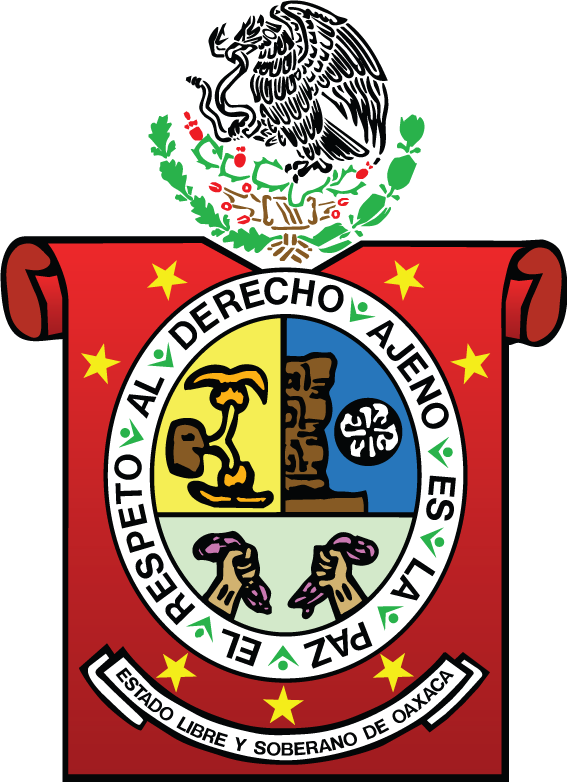
Coat of arms from 1950.

== See also ==
- Oaxaca
- Coat of arms of Mexico
