= Coat of arms of Chiapas =

Coat of Arms of Chiapas

The Coat of Arms of the Free and Sovereign State Chiapas was granted to the city of San Cristóbal de las Casas. The Coat of Arms of Chiapas is the heraldic emblem representative of the state of Chiapas, which was originally given in 1535 by Charles I of Spain to the "Very Royal and Very Insignia City of San Cristóbal de los Llanos de Chiapa", which was later made official as a coat of arms at the state level. According to the decree for its preservation and dissemination, it represents this entity and is part of the history, customs and values of the Chiapas people. Chiapas retained the design of a Spanish crown in their state symbols until 2025. In December 2025, the Congress of Chiapas approved a new coat of arms, which took effect on 1 January 2026.

== Symbolism ==
The shield is made up of a red field with two hills as a background. Above one of them, on the right side, there is a golden castle with two lateral columns with two windows each, a central building with a door and two windows that contains on its back side another column with a window, a rampant golden lion is juxtaposed to it; above the other hill, on the left side, a green palm with fruit and another rampant golden lion juxtaposed to it can be seen. On the horizon of the Rio Grande de Chiapa, two volcanic formations. Finally, as a crest a Marquis crown composed of a precious metal and stonework fence, decorated with four florets, of which three are visible, one whole in front and two in profile on its sides; Interspersed between the florets are four bouquets composed of three pearls each placed on small points, of which only two are visible at the front.

=== Historical coats ===
The symbol is used by all successive regimes in New Spain, in different forms.

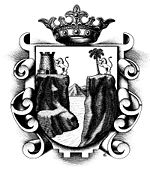
Coat of arms from 1712 to 1800.

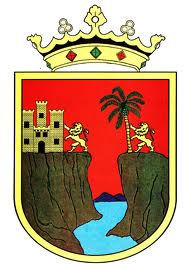
Coat of arms from 1824 to 1979.

Coat of arms from 1979 to 2025.

== See also ==
- Chiapas
- Coat of arms of Mexico
