= Coat of arms of Aguascalientes =

Seal of the Free and Sovereign State of Aguascalientes

Versions
- Armiger: State of Aguascalientes
- Adopted: 9 June 1946
- Motto: Bona Terra, Bona Gens, Aqua Clara, Clarum Coelum

The Coat of arms of Aguascalientes (Spanish: Escudo de Aguascalientes, lit. "state shield of Aguascalientes") is a symbol of the Free and Sovereign State of Aguascalientes in Mexico. Was adopted on 9 June 1946.

== Symbolism ==
The coat of arms of Aguascalientes is divided into three sections. The section on the top is blue and shows the image of Nuestra Señora de la Asunción in silver. She is held by two cherubim, symbolizing the foundation of the village. To her left is a water fountain being boiled, which represent the main characteristic of the territory, its hot waters. To her right are a gold chain and a set of lips, symbolizing freedom and the creation of Aguascalientes as an independent state after the secession from Zacatecas in 1857.

The lower dexter section is silver and features a dam and a bunch of grapes, representing irrigation and agriculture. The lower sinister section contains a cogwheel and a bee, symbolizing the industry and the hardworking spirit of the people of Aguascalientes, set against a golden yellow background.

The text on the blue outline of the shield reads "Bona Terra, Bona Gens, Aqua Clara, Clarum Coelum", which is Latin for "Good land, good people, clear water, clear sky". The crest is a silver helmet, which represents the founder of the village of Aguascalientes, Juan de Montoro.

== History ==
The coat of arms was the winning design on 9 June 1946 competition organized by the state government. Bernabé Ballesteros and Alejandro Topete del Valle was the designers.

=== Historical coats ===
The symbol is used by all successive regimes in different forms.

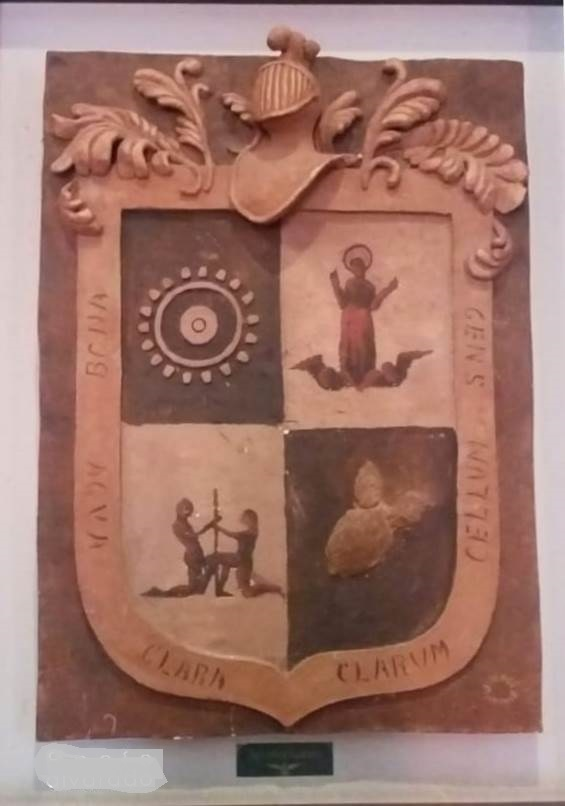
Coat of arms from 1846.

== See also ==
- Coat of arms of Mexico
- Aguascalientes
