= Coat of arms of Tabasco =

Seal of the Free and Sovereign State of Tabasco
- Armiger: State of Tabasco
- Adopted: 1824

The coat of arms of the Mexican state of Tabasco, has four sections. The top left has four golden castle towers, for the Spanish Kingdom of Castile. The bottom left a native with a bunch of flowers for the fertility of the farming land. The bottom right has a golden lion for the Spanish kingdom of León. The top right has an arm holding a shield and sword, for the military power of Spain. In the middle is an oval with the Virgin Mary, for the Catholic Church in the state. The silver and red backgrounds are for the loyalty of Tabasco, and the protection of Spain.

== See also ==
- Tabasco
- Coat of arms of Mexico
