= Flag of the Three Guarantees =

First national flag of Mexico

The Flag of the Three Guarantees of the Trigarante Army is considered the first official national flag of Mexico. It was the flag of the royalist and insurgent armed forces that united under the so-called Plan of Iguala, and was the work of the author of the Mexican independence Agustín de Iturbide, made in the city of Iguala by the tailor José Magdaleno Ocampo in the year 1821, in what Iturbide called the first year of sovereignty.

== Symbolism ==
This flag, which is still preserved, is rectangular and was formed by three stripes of equal thickness that cross it diagonally. They are ordered from left to right as follows: white, green and red; with an eight-pointed gold star on each diagonal stripe, making a total of three golden stars.

The meaning of the colors of the historical national flag are as follows:

Name	Color	HEX Code	Symbol
White		#FFFFFF	Religion
Green		#006847	Land
Red		#C90016	Blood of the heroes

== History ==
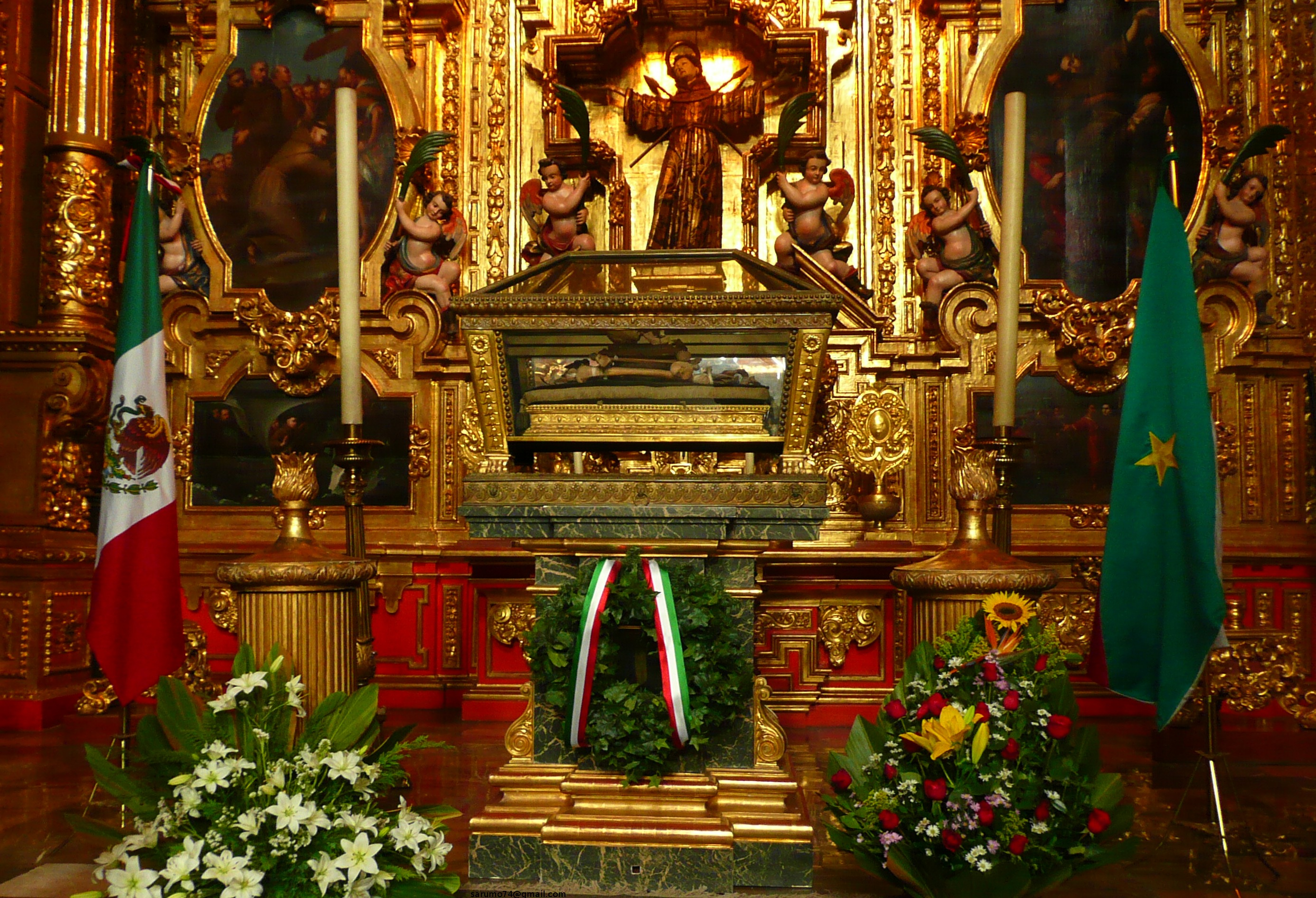
The Trigarante flag in Mexico City Metropolitan Cathedral

This army, being the result of the union of all the Mexican armed forces, needed a flag that would express this heroic fact of national independence in 1821. The case had been foreseen, and thus, on the day appointed for the promulgation of the plan, José Magdaleno Ocampo, a tailor in charge of making it, gave Iturbide's tricolor flag, whose essential elements remain in the current one as the Mexican Empire Regency.

During the government of Mexican former president Andrés Manuel López Obrador, the flag of the Three Guarantees was flown in the main square of Mexico City to celebrate the 200th anniversary of the consummation of Mexico's independence.

== Other flags ==
Flag of Tabasco

1824–1835
Flag of the State of Coahuila y Tejas as a part of Mexico

Flag of Mexico

== See also ==
- Army of the Three Guarantees
- List of Mexican flags
