= Francisco Eppens =

- Born: Francisco Eppens Helguera; 1 February 1913; San Luis Potosí, San Luis Potosí, Mexico
- Died: 6 September 1990 (aged 77); Mexico City, Mexico
- Education: San Carlos Academy
- Notable work: Coat of arms of Mexico
- Movement: Mexican muralism

Francisco Eppens Helguera (1 February 1913 – 6 September 1990) was a Mexican artist known for his paintings, murals and sculptures of images and scenes distinctly Mexican. He also achieved international fame for his award winning modern designs for Mexican postage and revenue stamps (1935–1953) and for his 1968 redesign of the Mexican coat of arms, still used today on Mexican government documents, coins and the national flag.

== Biography ==
Eppens' paternal grandfather, Adolfo Dietrich Eppens, was born in Basel, Switzerland, and moved to Mexico in 1863, where he married Eloísa Campillo of Hermosillo, Sonora. They moved to Switzerland, where Francisco Eppens Campillo, the artist's father, was born in 1888. Subsequently, the family relocated to San Luis Potosí, Mexico, where they operated a hardware business. The artist's father married Mercedes Helguera (b. 1884) of San Luis Potosí, Mexico, where Eppens was born on February 1, 1913.

In 1920, the family moved to Mexico City, where Eppens received his primary education. In 1927, he enrolled in a bachelor's degree program in engineering and architecture at the Escuela Nacional Preparatoria of the National Autonomous University of Mexico. Eppens left that program, however, and the following year studied painting and sculpture at the "Escuela de Artes Plásticas" (School of Fine Arts) of the Academia de San Carlos. For a few years, Eppens designed advertisements and posters, and starting in 1930 he worked at the Industria Cinematográfica Nacional as an artist.

In 1947 he married María Lascurain Segovia, with whom he had three children. He died in Mexico City on September 6, 1990.

== Postage stamp designs ==
In 1935, Eppens was employed by the Mexican government office which produced postage stamps and government securities, the Talleres de Impresión de Estampillas y Valores de México. Between 1935 and 1951, he designed a large number of postage and revenue stamps in a modernist or Art Deco style. Representative examples are the Helmsman stamp from 1940, issued in connection with the Inauguration of Mexican President Manuel Ávila Camacho, or the Wheat Sower stamp from 1942, issued to commemorate an international agricultural conference.

He also designed the small, but iconic, 1939 postal tax stamp depicting a man attacked by a giant mosquito, issued to raise funds to combat malaria. His stamp designs were popular internationally, receiving awards for "one of the best 10 stamps in the world" (1939) and "one of the six best stamps in the world" (1940), both awarded by Scott's Monthly Stamp Journal, and an exhibition of his stamps was held at the Collectors Club of New York in 1944.

In 2009, an exhibition of his stamps with original drawings and paintings was held in Oaxaca, Mexico, and a full length study of his stamp designs in the exhibit was published.

== Paintings and murals ==
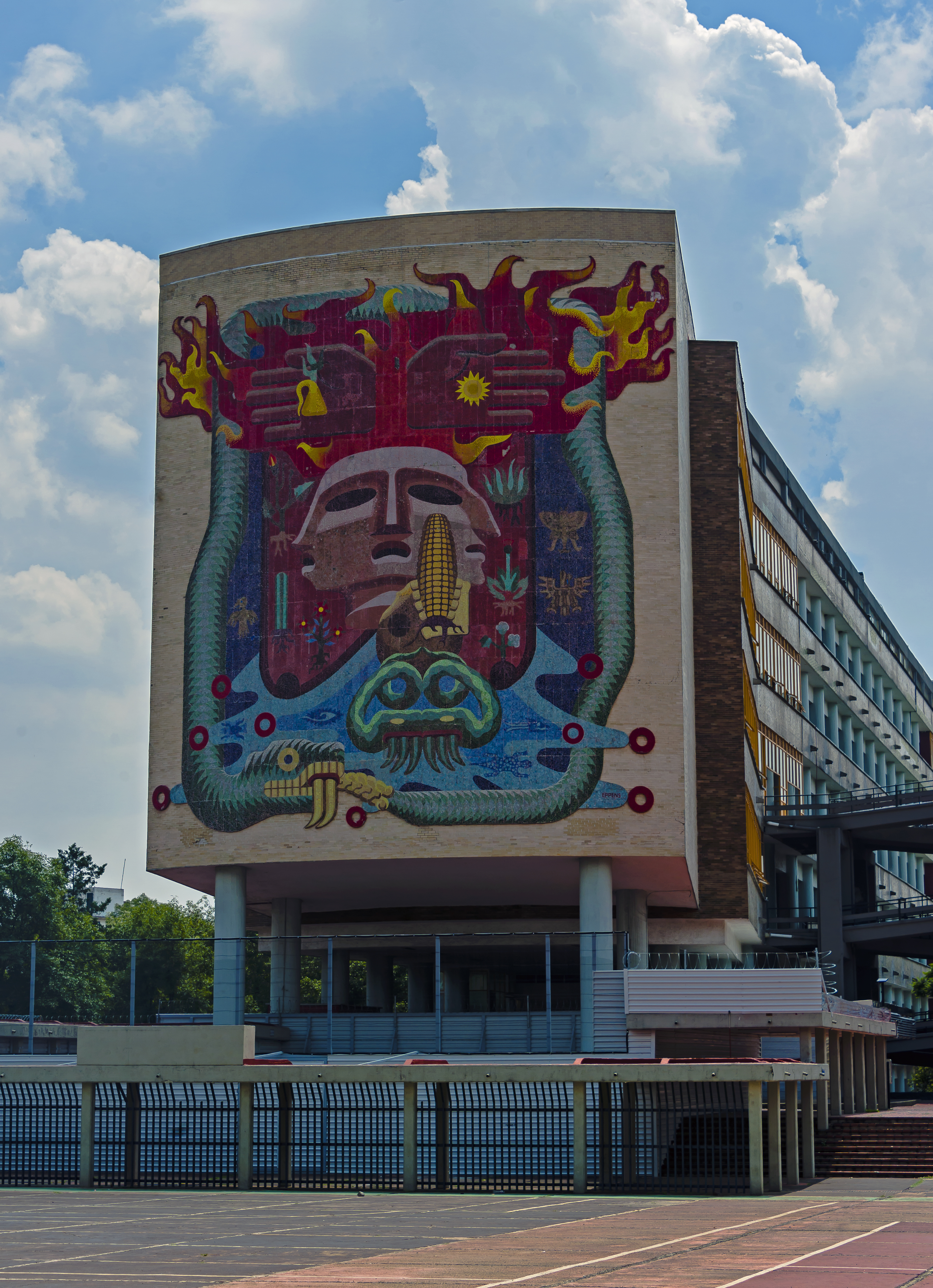
La vida, la muerte, el mestizaje y los cuatro elementos (Life, death, miscegenation and the four elements) in the School of Medicine of the National Autonomous University of Mexico

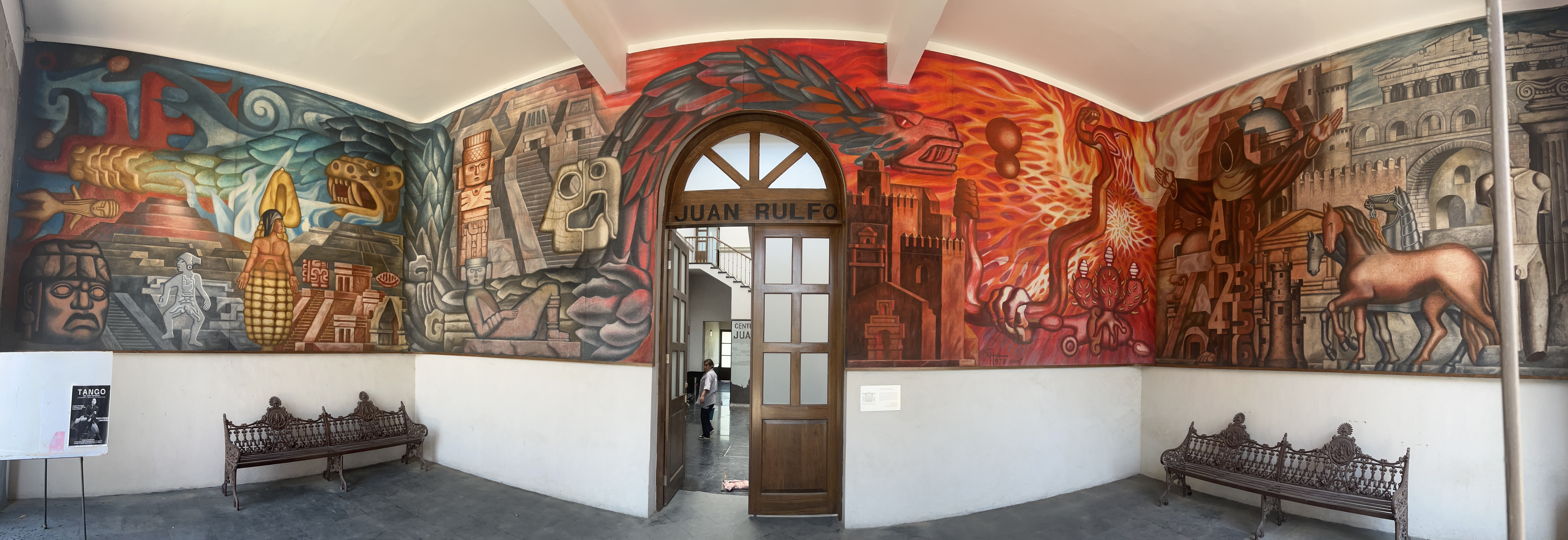
Nuestras raíces culturales (Our cultural roots) in the Juan Rulfo Cultural Centre in Insurgentes Mixcoac

In 1940, Eppens became associated with the "Escuela Mexicana del Realismo Critico" characterized by nationalistic themes, and also joined the Rancho del Artista group where he met Diego Rivera and other artists. In 1950, he became part of the group known as the Frente Nacional de Artes Plásticas, and in the late 1970s joined the group called Pictórico Contemporáneo A.C.

In the 1940s and 1950s, Eppens painted many murals in the interiors of institutional buildings. In the 1960s, he created similar glass mosaic murals for the exteriors of buildings, as well as some large metal sculptures. In the 1970s and 1980s he primarily created paintings.

Eppens' artistic style is characteristic of the Mexican Mural Renaissance and his works commonly feature characteristic Mexican themes such as Aztec and colonial architecture, scenes of folk life, farm animals, the Mexican eagle and symbol of the country, and Catholic images.

Eppens' best known art works include:

=== Paintings ===
- Alcatraces (Calla lilies), 1965
- Contrafuertes Coloniales (Colonial buttresses), 1971
- Arquitectura Prehispánica (Pre-Hispanic buildings), 1983
- La Danza de la Media Luna (Dance of the half moon), 1984
- Las Hermanas (The sisters), 1988

=== Murals ===
- La vida, la muerte, el mestizaje y los cuatro elementos, 1952
- La Revolución, Edificio del Partido Revolucionario Institucional, 1963.
- Nuestras raíces culturales, 1979.

=== Sculpture ===
- La Industria Nacional del Acero (The National Steel Industry), Bruno Pagliai Industrial City, Veracruz, 1973-74.

== Mexican coat of arms ==
Mexican coat of arms by Eppens

Eppens designed the 1968 version of the Mexican coat of arms, which is still used today on government documents, coins and the national flag.

== Exhibitions ==
Eppens' work was shown in various collective exhibitions over the years, including a group exhibit at the Museum of Modern Art in New York City in 1930, but with the exception of the 1944 exhibit of his stamps, he did not have solo exhibits until the 1980s:

- Collectors Club of New York, New York City, 1944.
- "Exposición Individual de Pinturas, Dibujos y Monotipos", Hotel Cancún Sheraton, Cancún, 1983.
- "Francisco Eppens: Pintor, Escultor y Muralista", Instituto Cultural Cabañas, Guadalajara, 1987.
- "Francisco Eppens: Pintor, Escultor y Muralista", Museo del Palacio de Bellas Artes, Mexico City, 1987.
- "El Mural Mexicano: Homenaje a Francisco Eppens", Edificio de la Sede del Partido Revolucionario Institutional, Mexico City, 1989.
- "Francisco Eppens, Artista Potosino", Instituto Potosino de Bellas Artes, Mexico City, 1990.
- "Francisco Eppens: Pintor, Escultor y Muralista", Casa de Cultura, San Luis Potosí, 1993.
- "Exposición - Homenaje del Artista Francisco Eppens", Secretaria de Gobernación, Mexico City, 1996.
- "Francisco Eppens, Pintor Muralista", Museo de Arte de Querétaro, Querétaro, 1999.
- "Francisco Eppens, Pintor Muralista", Edifico de la Real Caja, Centro Cultural Universitario, San Luis Potosí, 1999.
- "Los Potosinos y los Simbolos Patrios", Museo de la Cultura Potosina, San Luis Potosí, 2000.
- "Exposición - Homenaje del Artista Francisco Eppens", Edificio del Senado de la República, Mexico City, 2000.
- "Eppens: Mensajeros del Mexico Moderno", Museo de Filatelia de Oaxaca, Oaxaca, 2009. Exhibit of stamps designed by Eppens, with original drawings and paintings.

== See also ==
- Postage stamps and postal history of Mexico.
- Art Deco stamps.
