= Law on the National Arms, Flag, and Anthem (Mexico) =

The Law on the National Coat of Arms, Flag and Anthem (Spanish: Ley sobre el Escudo, la Bandera y el Himno Nacional) is a set of rules and guidelines passed by the Mexican government on the display and use of the flag (bandera), coat of arms (escudo) and the anthem (himno). The original law was passed in 1984 and it contains 7 chapters, a preamble and a section that contains the lyrics of the national anthem. The law itself was changed several times, most recently in 2005.

Under this law, a special permit is required to broadcast the Mexican flag, as the flag can only be reproduced for official government purposes.

== Chapter One ==
It consists of two sentences, simply stating that the flag, arms and anthem are the symbols of the country and that this law was established to render honor and respect to the symbols.

== Chapter Two ==
Consisting of three articles, this chapter contains brief descriptions of each national symbol. Article two describes the coat of arms, article 3 describes the flag and explains that the national anthem will be established according to other laws. Each article states that a copy of each symbol will be kept at the General National Archive (Archivo General de la Nación) and the National History Museum (Museo Nacional de Historia).

== Chapter Three ==
Consisting of two articles, this chapter describes how the coat of arms can be made or used. Article 4 states that the coat of arms will be made according to what was stated in Chapter 2 of this law and Article 5 states that certain officials, documents, seals and laws can be affixed with a special coat of arms. The difference with this coat of arms is that the entire arms is black and white, and the words "Estados Unidos Mexicanos" (United Mexican States) appear in a semicircle at the top of the arms, between the olive branch and the oak wreath. Article 5 also states that the coat of arms can be affixed to vehicles operated by the government, such as vehicles that transport the President of Mexico.

== Chapter Four ==
This chapter, which describes about the national flag in detail, is the longest of the three chapters on each symbol. Consisting of thirty articles, this chapter lists dates on when the Mexican flag is flown and how it is flown, about the various honors that is presented to the flag and the various flag devices that can be used, such as the corbata.

This chapter also sets the guidelines for the use of the Mexican Presidential Sash.

== See also ==
- Law of Mexico
