= Flag-flying days in Mexico =

The National Flag of Mexico

In Article 18 of the Law on the National Arms, Flag, and Anthem (Ley Sobre El Escudo, la Bandera y el Himno Nacionales) there is a listing of dates that the Mexican flag is flown by all branches of government. Civilians are also encouraged to display the national flag on these days. Many of the dates listed in the law denote significant events and people that shaped of Mexican identity and the course of its history. Some of the holidays and commemorations listed require the flag to be flown at half-staff. The national flag can be flown any day of the year by civilians or at festive occasions in pursuance to Article 15 of the Law on the National Arms, Flag, and Anthem.

== Full staff ==
The Mexican flag will be flown at full staff on the following days:

Date	Occasion
21 January	Birth of Ignacio Allende (1779).
5 February	Adoption of the Constitutions of 1857 and 1917.
19 February	Día del Ejército Mexicano (Day of the Mexican Army).
24 February	Día de la Bandera (Flag Day).
1 March	Proclamation of the Plan of Ayutla.
18 March	Anniversary of the Oil Expropriation (1938).
21 March	Birth of Benito Juárez (1806).
26 March	Adoption of the Plan of Guadalupe during the Mexican Revolution.
2 April	Capture of Puebla (1867).
21 April	Heroic defense of Veracruz to prevent occupation by United States forces (1914).
1 May	Día del Trabajo (May Day).
5 May	Anniversary of the Victory over the French Army in Puebla, in 1862. (Cinco de Mayo)
8 May	Birth of Miguel Hidalgo y Costilla, the initiator of the War Mexican Independence (1753).
15 May	Capture of Querétaro by the forces of the Republic which led to the fall of the Second Mexican Empire (1867).
1 June	Día de la Marina Nacional (Mexican Navy and National Maritime Day).
21 June	Victory of the Republican Armies over the Second Mexican Empire (1867).
1 September	Opening of the first ordinary session of the Mexican Congress.
14 September	Incorporation of Chiapas as a Federal State.
15 September	Commemoration of the Grito de Dolores.
16 September	Beginning of the Mexican War of Independence (1810).
27 September	Formal conclusion of the Mexican War of Independence (1821).
30 September	Birth of José María Morelos (1765).
12 October	Día de la Raza (Columbus Day).
23 October	Día Nacional de la Aviación. (National Aviation Day).
24 October	Día de las Naciones Unidas. (United Nations Day).
30 October	Birth of Francisco I. Madero (1873).
6 November	Adoption of the Act of National Independence by the Congress of Chilpancingo (1813).
20 November	Beginning of the Mexican Revolution (1910).
29 December	Birth of Venustiano Carranza (1859).
December	On the day of the Closing of Session of the Mexican Congress.

== Half staff ==
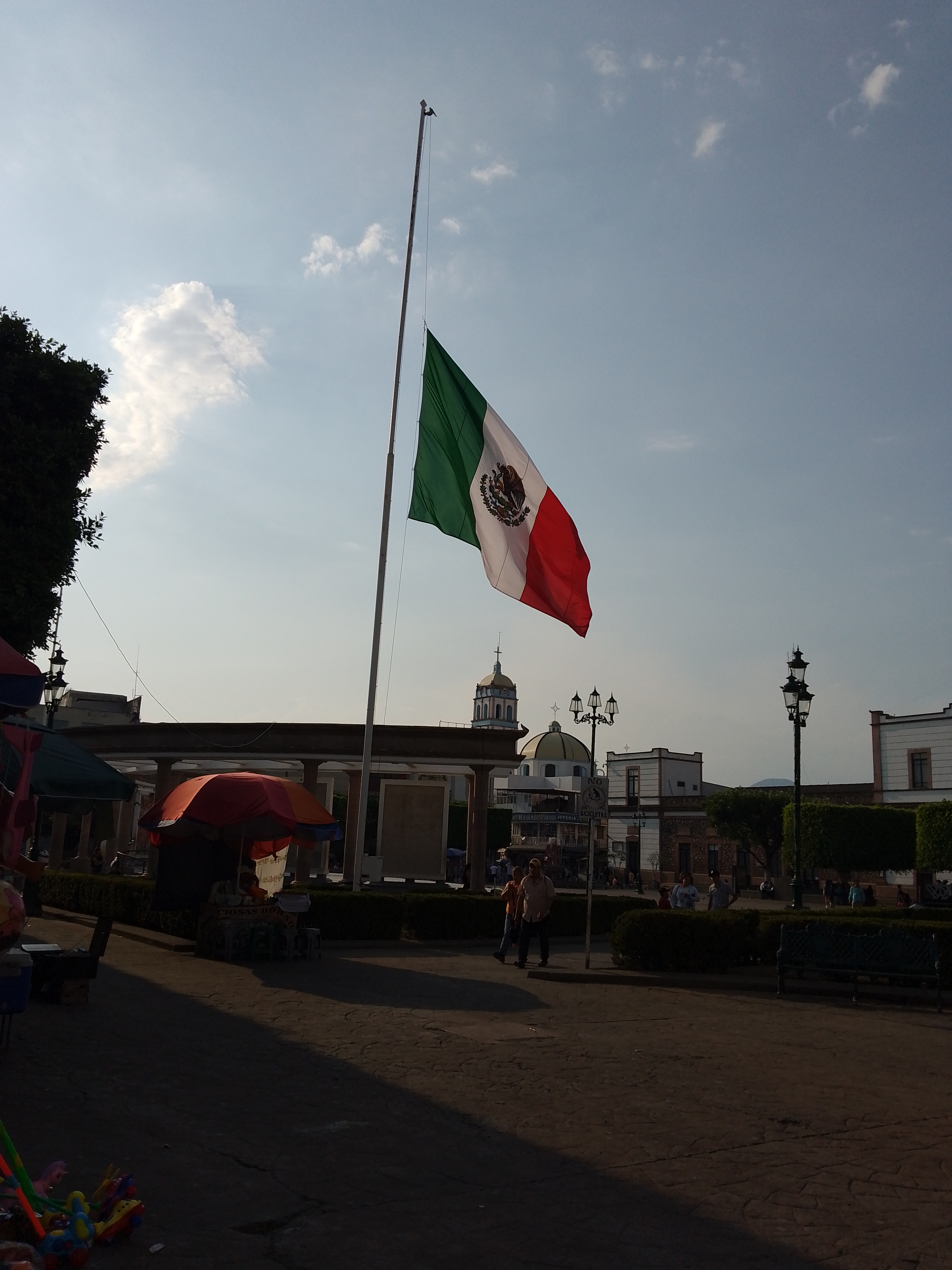
Mexican flag at half mast in Zitacuaro, Michoacan

On these following days, the national flag is flown at half staff, mostly commemorating the deaths of important heroes. At any time, the President of Mexico can issue a decree to have the flag flown at half-staff to honor the death of a person who was a major figure of the Mexican government, Mexican society, the head of state of another nation or a tragic event on a major scale. One example is that on the 19th anniversary of the Mexico City earthquake in 1985, President Vicente Fox lowered the flags to half staff to honor the estimated 6,000 people who were killed.

Date	Motive
14 February	Death of Vicente Guerrero (1831).
22 February	Death of Francisco I. Madero (1913).
28 February	Death of Cuauhtémoc, last Aztec Emperor (1525).
10 April	Death of Emiliano Zapata (1919).
2 May	Death of the pilots of the 201st Mexican Expeditionary Air Force during World War II (1945).
21 May	Death of Venustiano Carranza (1920).
5 June	Commemoration of the victims of the 2009 Hermosillo daycare center fire (2009).
17 July	Death of General Alvaro Obregón (1924).
18 July	Death of Benito Juárez (1872).
30 July	Death of Miguel Hidalgo y Costilla (1811).
12 September	Commemoration of the sacrifice of Saint Patrick's Battalion during the Mexican–American War (1847).
13 September	Fall of the Niños Héroes during the Battle of Chapultepec (1847).
19 September	Anniversaries of the 1985 Mexico City earthquake, 2017 Chiapas earthquake and the 2017 Puebla earthquake
2 October	Commemoration of the Tlatelolco massacre (1968).
7 October	Commemoration of the sacrifice of Senator Belisario Domínguez (1913).
22 December	Death of José María Morelos (1815).

== Former flag days ==
There also have been occasions where official flag day notices that been announced in the Official Journal of the Federation, but later revoked. One such case was that 1 November was declared a holiday to hoist the national flag in 1991, but was later removed from the list four years later from another order published in Official Journal of the Federation.

== Notes ==
1. Change of Article 18 to add 21 April as a flag day; January 3, 2005. Retrieved 10 January 2006.
2. The precise date varies every year.
3. The Arizona Daily Star (2005). Around the world; September 20, 2004. Retrieved 9 January 2006.
4. Addition of 2 May as a day to fly the Mexican flag at half-staff. Retrieved 11 January 2006.
5. Holiday created on 9 January 1991 in an order published in the Diario Official de la Federación; revoked in an order published 9 May 1995 in Diario Official de la Federación.
