= Flag of Mexico =

Mexico
- Use: National flag and ensign
- Proportion: 4:7
- Adopted: September 16, 1968; 58 years ago
- Design: A vertical tricolor of green, white and red, with the National Coat of Arms anchoring a white band.
- Designed by: Agustin de Iturbide (Original version); Francisco Eppens Helguera
- Use: Naval jack
- Proportion: 1:1
- Design: A diagonal tricolor of white, green, red, with a thin anchor in the center. Three eight-pointed gold stars are in the canton, and the bottom two corners.

The national flag of Mexico (Spanish: bandera nacional de México) is a vertical tricolor of green, white, and red with the national coat of arms charged in the center of the white stripe. While the meaning of the colors has changed over time, these three colors were adopted by Mexico following independence from Spain during the country's War of Independence, and subsequent First Mexican Empire.

Red, white, and green are the colors of the national army in Mexico. The central emblem is the Mexican coat of arms, based on the Aztec symbol for Tenochtitlan (now Mexico City), the center of the Aztec Empire. It recalls the legend of a golden eagle sitting on a nopal cactus while devouring a serpent that signaled to the Aztecs where to found their city, Tenochtitlan.

== History ==
The Twin Flags of Allende, a pair of flags that were made expressly by the then-captain of the Army of New Spain, Ignacio Allende, for the armed struggle that would begin on 1 October 1810, but since the date of the armed uprising was brought forward due to the discovery of the conspiracy, the flags had to be used without further preparation

The flag of the Army of the Three Guarantees, an early use of the colors red, white, and green to represent the cause of Mexican independence

Flag of the First Mexican Empire, 1821–23

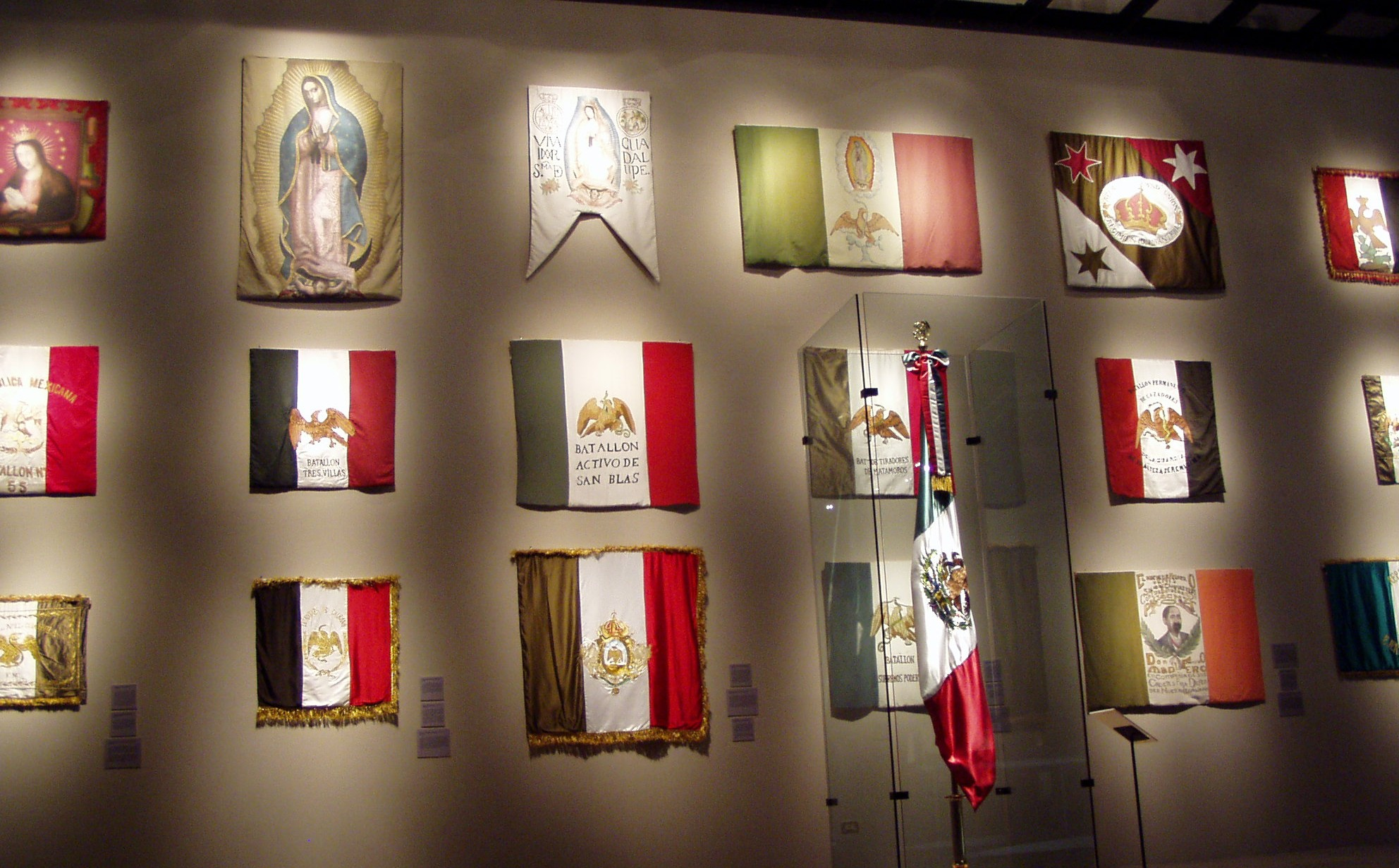
Flag display at the Mexican History Museum of Monterrey, Nuevo León

Before the adoption of the first national flag, various flags were used during the War of Independence from Spain. Though it was never adopted as an official flag, many historians consider the first Mexican flag to be the Standard of the Virgin of Guadalupe, which was carried by Miguel Hidalgo after the Grito de Dolores on 16 September 1810. The Standard became the initial symbol of the rebel army during the Mexican War of Independence. Various other Standards were used during the war. José María Morelos used a flag with an image of the Virgin to which was added a blue and white insignia with a crowned eagle on a cactus over a three-arched bridge and the letters V.V.M. (Viva la Virgen María – "long live the Virgin Mary"). The Revolutionary Army also used a flag featuring the colours white, blue and red in vertical stripes. The first use of the modern colours—green, white and red—was in the flag of the unified Army of the Three Guarantees (pictured left) after independence from Spain was won.

While similar to the national flag that is used today, the eagle in these arms is not holding a serpent in his talons and a crown has been affixed to the head of the eagle to signify the Empire. Variants of this flag that appeared in this period also included a naval flag that had the tricolour pattern, but it only contained the eagle with the crown above its head. The military also used a similar square flag, but the eagle was larger than the one on the national flag. The national flag was officially decreed by Agustín de Iturbide in November 1821 and first officially used in July 1822. This flag was no longer used upon the abolishment of the empire.

The first national flag was established in 1821, the first year of Mexican recognition of sovereignty. The imperial government that was set up chose a tricolour flag of green, white, and red and charged with the national coat of arms. The official decree stated that

Sole article:... the national flag and flags of the army shall be tricolor, adopting forever the colours green, white and "encarnado" [flesh-colored red] arranged vertically, with the crowned eagle in the center of the white stripe, according to the following design

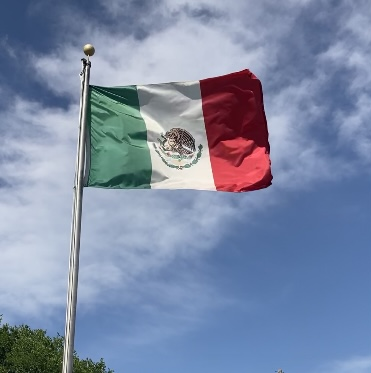
Flag of Mexico flying on outdoor flagpole.

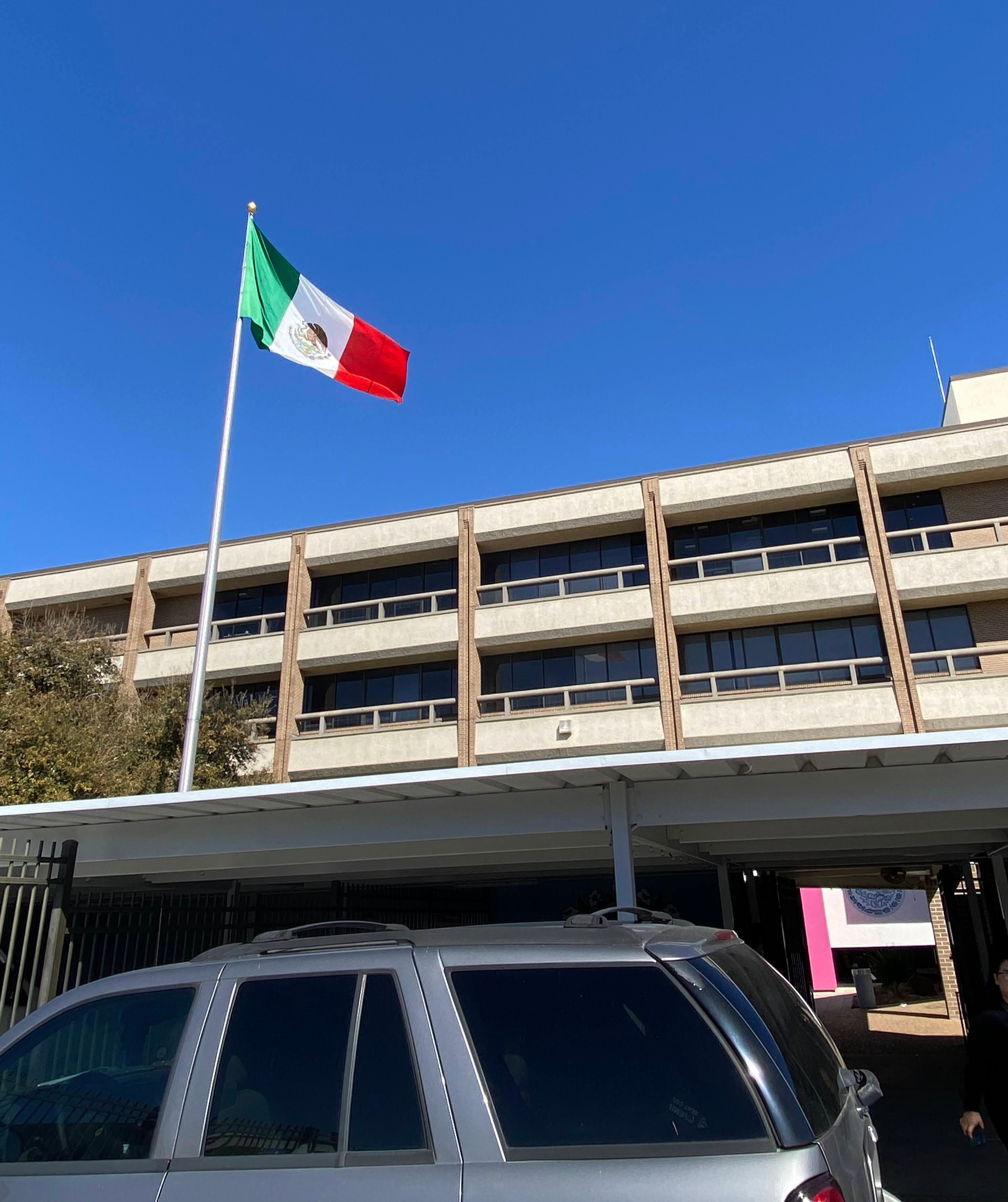
Flag waving over the Consulate-General of Mexico in Houston.

The second national flag was adopted after the establishment of the first federal republic in 1823. The new flag was chosen for the republic in April of that year, the only difference being the appearance of the central emblem. The crown was removed from the eagle's head, and a serpent was placed in the eagle's right talon. Another addition to the flag is a branch of oak and laurel branches, a tradition that was carried over to the current flag. This flag was discontinued in 1864 upon the dissolution of the first federal republic.

The third national flag was that of the Second Mexican Empire. Once again, the national flag used the green, white, and red tricolour pattern with the white stripe charged with the national arms. However, the ratio of the flag was changed from 4:7 to 1:2 and four eagles, which had crowns above their heads, were placed at each corner of the flag. The design, which was ordered by the Emperor Maximilian, gave the arms a look similar to the French Imperial arms, but he decided to add a bit of "Mexican flavour" to the flag. The coat of arms was described in a decree issued in November 1865 as:

oval in shape in blue; in the center is depicted the eagle of Anahuac, in profile and passant, supported by a cactus, supported, in turn, by a rock sunk on water, and ripping a snake. The border is gold charged by a garland of encino and laurel. The crest is the Imperial Crown. As supporters, two griffins from our elders' arms, their upper half in black and the lower in gold; behind the scepter and sword in saltire. The shield is surrounded by the collar of the Order of the Águila Mexicana, and the motto: "Equidad en la Justicia" [Equity in Justice]

Reverse side of the flag

The current national flag was adopted on 16 September 1968, and was confirmed by law on 24 February 1984. The current version is an adaptation of the design approved by presidential decree in 1916 by Venustiano Carranza, where the eagle was changed from a front-facing to a side-facing position. Before adopting the current national flag, the government used official flags. All of these flags used the tricolour pattern with the only difference being the changes in the coat of arms, which was still charged in the center of the white stripe. One possible reason for the 1968 flag and arms change was that Mexico City was the host of the 1968 Summer Olympic Games. Around this same period, the plain tricolor flag that Mexico used as its merchant ensign was also legally abandoned. The reasoning is that without the coat of arms, the flag would become nearly identical to the Italian flag.

There was also a debate in 1984 about how the coat of arms would be depicted on the reverse of the flag. To solve this problem, a PAN deputy proposed a change to the Law of the National Arms, Flag, and Anthem that same year to allow for the eagle to face to the right when the reverse of the flag is displayed. In 1995, the law was changed to include the following:

When the National Arms is reproduced on the reverse side of the National Flag, the Mexican Eagle will appear standing on its right talon, holding with the left one and the beak the curved serpent.

== Design and symbolism ==
Official construction sheet

The Mexican coat of arms

The official design of the Mexican flag can be found in Article 3 of the Law on the National Arms, Flag, and Anthem, passed in 1984. While the exact shades of the flag have not been defined by law, in 2001 it was reported, through personal communication, to Flags of the World that the Interior Ministry (Secretaría de Gobernación) has suggested the following tones in the Pantone system; nevertheless, the ministry has not officially ruled on the matter. So far, there are no official printed documents or statements on the colour shades. The Pantone colours listed below were employed by the London Organising Committee of the Olympic Games and Paralympic Games Limited in its "Flag Manual". while 2008 Beijing Olympic Games Flag Manual proposed others.

Color scheme	Green	White	Red
Pantone	3425c	Safe	186c
RGB	0-104-71	255-255-255	206-17-37
CMYK	100-34-93-30	0-0-0-0	0-92-82-19
Web colors	006847	FFFFFF	CE1125

The article dictates what must be featured on the flag and also its proportions. Copies of the national flag which are made according to this law are kept in two locations: the General National Archive (Archivo General de la Nación) and the National Museum of History (Museo Nacional de Historia).

Art. 3: The Bandera Nacional is a rectangle divided into three vertical stripes of identical measures, with the colours placed in the following order from hoist to fly: green, white, and red. Centered in the white stripe, the National Coat of Arms has a diameter of three-fourths the width of the white stripe. The proportion of the flag is four to seven (Ratio 4:7). It could carry a rope or tie of the same colours below the truck.

=== Differences with Italian flag ===
This is a comparison of similarities of the Mexican and the Italian flags.

The Mexican tricolour (green, white, red) has been continuously used for a longer time than the Italian one. At the time of the Mexican flag's adoption, the similarly toned Italian tricolor had not been used by any sovereign nation in Europe. Napoleon's puppet state Cisalpine Republic in what would become northern Italy adopted it in 1797, but with horizontal stripes and different proportions from the modern Italian flag.

Due to the common arrangement of the colours, at first sight, it seems that the only difference between the Italian and the Mexican flag is only the coat of arms of Mexico present in the latter. Both flags use the same colours (green, white, and red), but the Mexican flag has darker shades of green and red (particularly green). Additionally, these flags present a different aspect ratio (proportions): the Italian flag aspect ratio is 2:3 (1 to 1.5), more squarish in shape, while the Mexican flag aspect ratio is 4:7 (1 to 1.75), a longer shape.

The similarity between the two flags posed a serious problem in maritime transport, given that originally the Mexican mercantile flag was devoid of arms and consequently identical to the Italian Republican tricolour of 1946; to obviate the inconvenience, at the request of the International Maritime Organization, both Italy and Mexico adopted naval flags with different crests.

== Protocol ==
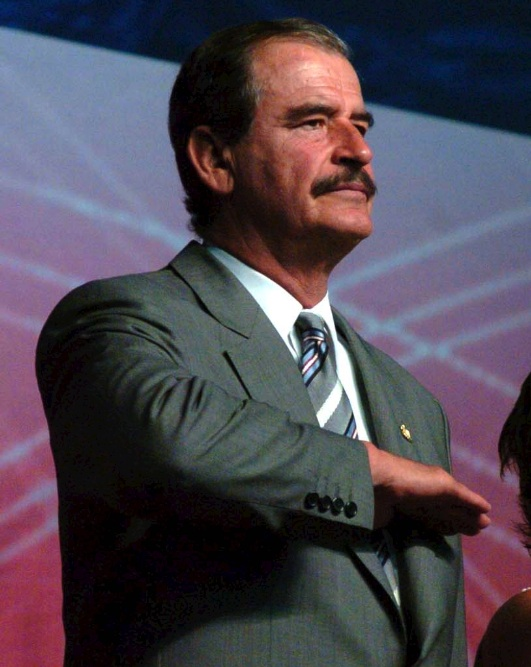
The civil salute given by former Mexican President Vicente Fox (2005)

When the flag is paraded in front of a crowd, those in military uniform must present a salute according to military regulations. Civilians who are present give the following salute to the national flag: standing at attention (firms), they raise their right arms and place their right hands on their chests front of the heart. The hand is flat and the palm of the hand is facing the ground. This salute is known as the El saludo civil a la Bandera Nacional ("The Civil Salute to the National Flag"). When the President is acting in the capacity of the Head of the Armed Forces, he salutes the national flag with a military salute. When the national anthem is played on television to open or close daily programming, the national flag will be shown at the same time. During certain times of the year, the flag is flown by both civilians and government personnel. Mostly, these events coincide with national holidays and days of significance to the country. During some of these occasions, the flag will be flown at half-mast to honor the death of important Mexicans. These dates are listed in Article 18 of the Law of the National Flag, Arms, and Anthem. The national Día de la Bandera (Flag Day) celebration occurs on February 24. On this day in 1821, all the factions fighting in the War of Independence joined to form the Army of the Three Guarantees in response to the Plan de Iguala, which was signed by Vicente Guerrero and Agustín de Iturbide, declaring Mexico officially an independent country. General Vicente Guerrero was the first military official who swore allegiance to the national flag. Another flag tradition is that before every Olympics in which Mexico is a participant, the President hands a flag over to the flag bearer, chosen by their peers, to carry with them to the host city.

=== Civil ceremonies ===
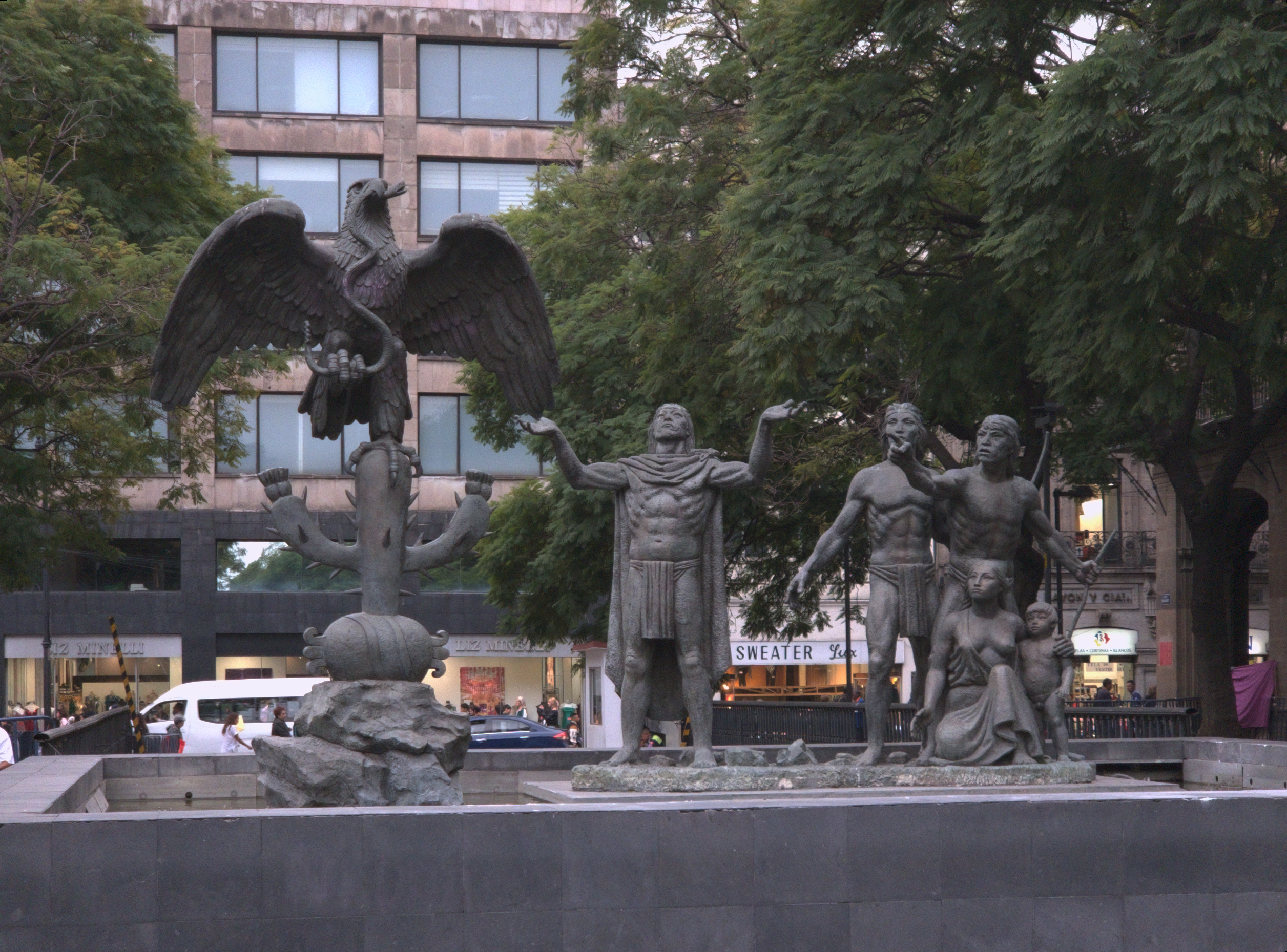
Mexican sculpture about the founding of Tenochtitlan.

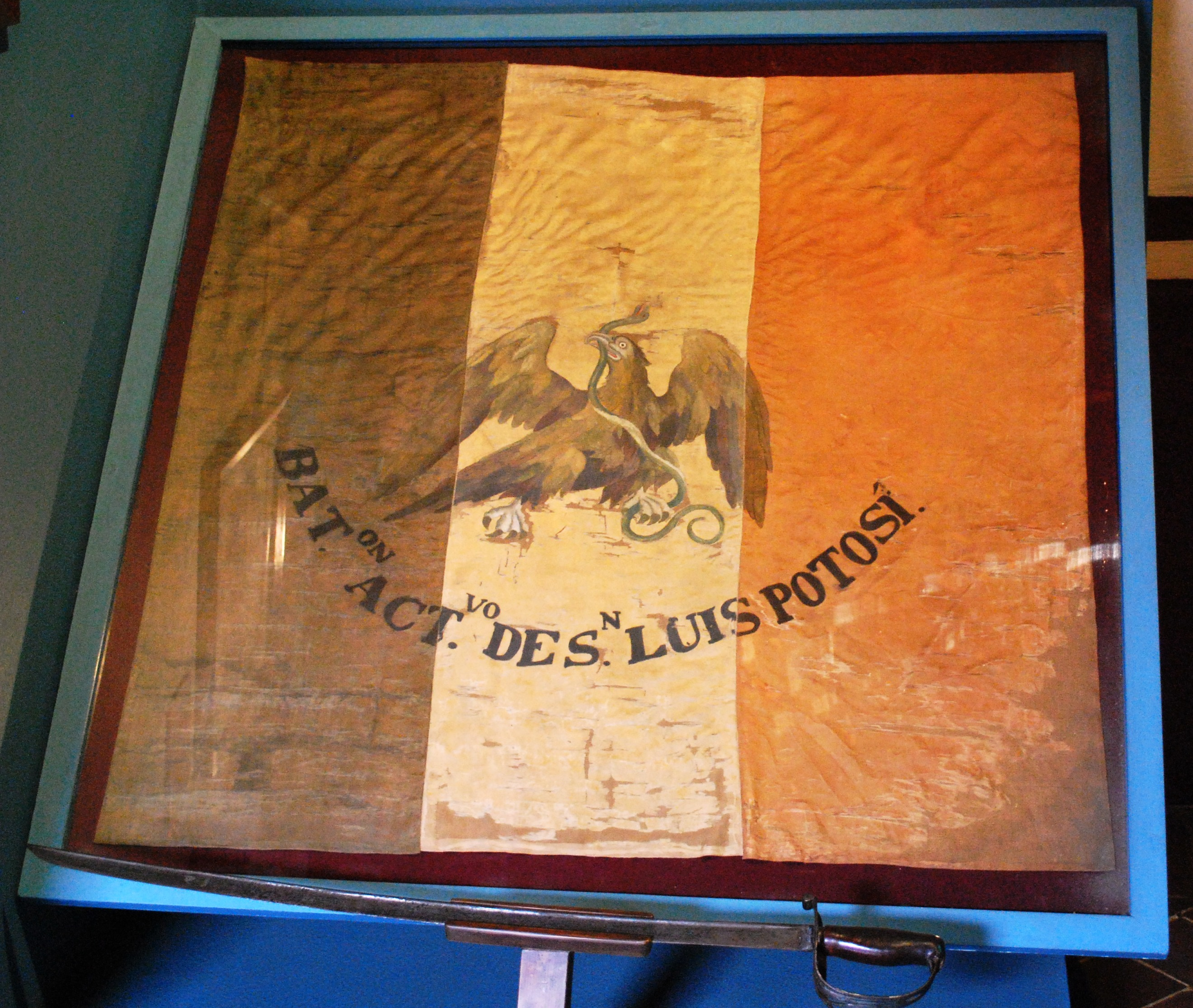
Churubusco flag

The flag songs are dedicated to the flag day, it is a national holiday in Mexico. Flag Day is celebrated every year on 24 February since its implementation in 1937. The songs were established by President of Mexico General Lázaro Cárdenas before the monument to General Vicente Guerrero, first to pledge allegiance to the Mexican flag and Agustin de Iturbide:

The Juramento a la Bandera

¡Bandera de México!
Legado de nuestros héroes,
símbolo de la unidad
de nuestros padres y nuestros hermanos.
Te prometemos ser siempre fieles
a los principios de libertad y de justicia
que hacen de nuestra patria la nación independiente, humana y generosa
a la que entregamos nuestra existencia.

Translation: The Oath to the Flag

Flag of Mexico!
Legacy of our heroes,
symbol of the unity
of our parents and our siblings.
We promise to always be loyal
to the principles of liberty and justice
that make our homeland
the independent nation, humane and generous
to which we give our existence.

The Toque de Bandera

Se levanta en el mástil mi bandera
como un sol entre céfiros y trinos
muy adentro en el templo de mi veneración,
oigo y siento contento latir mi corazón
Es mi bandera, la enseña nacional,
son estas notas su cántico marcial.
Desde niños sabremos venerarla
Y también por su amor, ¡vivir!
Almo y sacro pendón que en nuestro anhelo
como rayo de luz se eleva al cielo
inundando a través de su lienzo tricolor
inmortal nuestro ser de fervor y patrio ardor.
Es mi bandera, la enseña nacional,
son estas notas su cántico marcial.
Desde niños sabremos venerarla
Y también por su honor, ¡morir!

Translation: The Salute to the Flag

My flag rises in the mast
like a sun between winds and warbles
very inside in the temple of my veneration,
I hear and feel my heart happily beating
It's my flag, the national standard,
These notes are its martial canticle.
From childhood we'll know how to venerate it
and also for its love, to live!
Venerable and sacred banner that in our yearning
like a ray of light rises to the sky
flooding through its immortal three-coloured canvas
our being of fervour and homeland ardour.
It's my flag, the national standard,
these notes are its martial canticle.
From childhood we'll know how to venerate it
and also for its honour, to die!

==== Pledge of Fidelity ====
The following pledge of fidelity is taken every February 24 and any day whenever new flags are given to institutions in accordance with the form established by Article 3 of the Law on the National Arms, Flag, and Anthem:

Summons: Ciudadanos: Vengo en nombre de México, a encomendar a vuestro patriotismo, esta bandera que simboliza su independencia, su honor, sus instituciones y la integridad de su territorio. ¿Protestáis honrarla y defenderla con lealtad, patriotismo y constancia? Response: ¡Sí, protesto! Challenge: Al concederos el honor de ponerla en vuestras/sus manos, la Patria confía en que, como buenos y leales mexicanos, sabréis cumplir vuestra/su protesta.	Summons: Dear citizens: I come in the name of Mexico, to confide to your patriotism presenting this flag that symbolizes its independence, its honour, its institutions and the integrity of its territory. Do you pledge to honour and defend it with loyalty, patriotism and constance? Response: Yes, I pledge! Challenge: As it concedes you the honour of putting this flag in your hands, the Fatherland is confident that you, as good and loyal Mexicans, will know to fulfill your pledge.

The pledge taking is taken on this day in a presentation of colours ceremony to units of the Armed Forces, National Guard, law enforcement and emergency organizations, as well as public schools and colleges of the Secretariat of Education.

=== Variants ===
Mexico (variants)
- Federal Body Secretaries and Presidential Standard
- Use: State flag
- Proportion: 4:7
- Adopted: December 1, 2000; 25 years ago
- Design: The national flag with the coat of arms in gold, except the stone, lake, and eagle's talons, which are silver; the tricolor ribbon remains in green, white and red, arched up on top of the emblem is "ESTADOS UNIDOS MEXICANOS" in gold
- Alternative government flag
- Use: State flag
- Proportion: 4:7
- Design: The national flag with a completely golden coat of arms
- Cravat
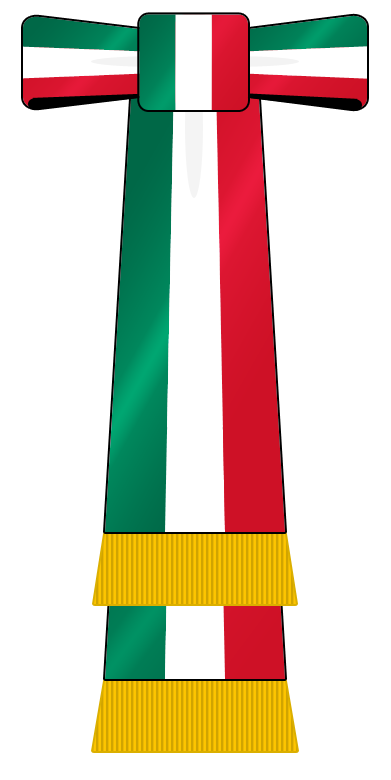

A vertical variant of the national flag of Mexico

There are two variants of the national flag that are mostly used by the state and federal governments, the difference between the national flag and the variants are the designs of the coat of arms. In the first variant, which is used by the President of Mexico and secretaries of federal bodies, the entire coat of arms is coloured gold, with the exception of the tricolour ribbon, remaining in green, white and red, and the stone, lake and talons of the eagle coloured in silver. In the second variant, the entire coat of arms is coloured gold, even the ribbon, lake, stone and talons. The second variant is used mostly by the state governments and federal bodies who are not able to use the first variant.

=== Law articles ===
- In Article 3 of the Law on the National Arms, Flag and Anthem (Ley sobre el Escudo, la Bandera y el Himno Nacionales) also describes that the national flag can be decorated with a special tie called a corbata (cravat). The corbata is composed of a bow, two ribbons of different length and both ribbons are attached with a golden tassel called fringe. The corbata is placed on the top of the flag at the point where the truck is, and the colours of the corbata match that of the national flag. Organizations and political parties can adopt their own corbatas, such as the National Action Party (PAN), which uses a white corbata with blue fringes.
- In Article 3 of the Flag Law does not give an official symbolism to the colors, other meanings may be given to them. Other groups have used the national colors as part of their own logos or symbols. For example, the Institutional Revolutionary Party (PRI) political party has adopted the national colors as part of their logo. Another political party, the Party of the Democratic Revolution (PRD), also had the national colors as part of their logo, but changed them in the 1990s after a controversy surrounding impartiality issues, while the PRI did not. Several states, such as Querétaro and Hidalgo have incorporated either elements of the national flag, or even the entire flag, into their coat of arms.
- In Article 5 of the Law on the National Arms, Flag and Anthem (Ley sobre el Escudo, la Bandera y el Himno Nacionales), the section details that "All reproductions of the National Emblem must faithfully correspond to the model that is referred in Article 2. of this Law, which cannot be varied or altered under any circumstance." From this statement, the design consisting (golden) eagle perched on a prickly pear cactus devouring a rattlesnake when displayed on the national flag must stay in its upright position, facing the green stripe, as facing down means distress to the United Mexican States. While the article does not explicitly state about non-horizontal orientation, the national emblem must never be on its side (either left or right), as it is considered deceased or defeated. When rotating the flag so that the green stripe is on top, the emblem is to be rotated 90 degrees clockwise to its legally defined position.

=== Regulations for use ===
The image of the flag is protected under law. A special permit is needed to broadcast its image. In February 2010, MTV Mexico was forced to delay the premiere of the "Pinewood Derby" episode of South Park (which featured exaggerated portrayals of multiple world leaders, including then-Mexican president Felipe Calderón) as it did not receive clearance before airtime (it aired two months later when the permit was eventually issued).

In 2008, Mexican pop singer Paulina Rubio was fined for posing nude wrapped in the flag in a photo shoot for a Spanish magazine.

=== Others ===
Other flags were flown as Mexican flags, either designed to intimidate the enemy or to act as identification. These flags were considered without subsequent formal documentation as national flag and temporally situated; Flag of Francisco I. Madero (9 February 1913), Flag of Doliente Hidalgo (2 January 1812), Flag of José María Morelos y Pavón, Flag of Francisco Villa, Flag of Siera Battalion, Flag of Jalisco Battalion, Libres de Puebla Battalion, Artillería Mina Battalion, Oaxaca Battalion, Toluca Battalion, Flag of Chihuahua Battalion, Flag of Durango Battalion, Flag of San Lorenzo Battalion, Flag of Lanceros Battalion, Flag of San Luis Potosí Battalion, Flag of Aguascalientes Battalion, Flag of Galeana Battalion (22 May 1864), Flag of San Blas Battalion (24 September 1846), Flag of Tres Villas Battalion, Flag of Milicias Battalion, Flag of Remixto Battalion, Flag of Quautla Battalion, Flag of 201 Squadron, Etc.

== Monumental flags ==
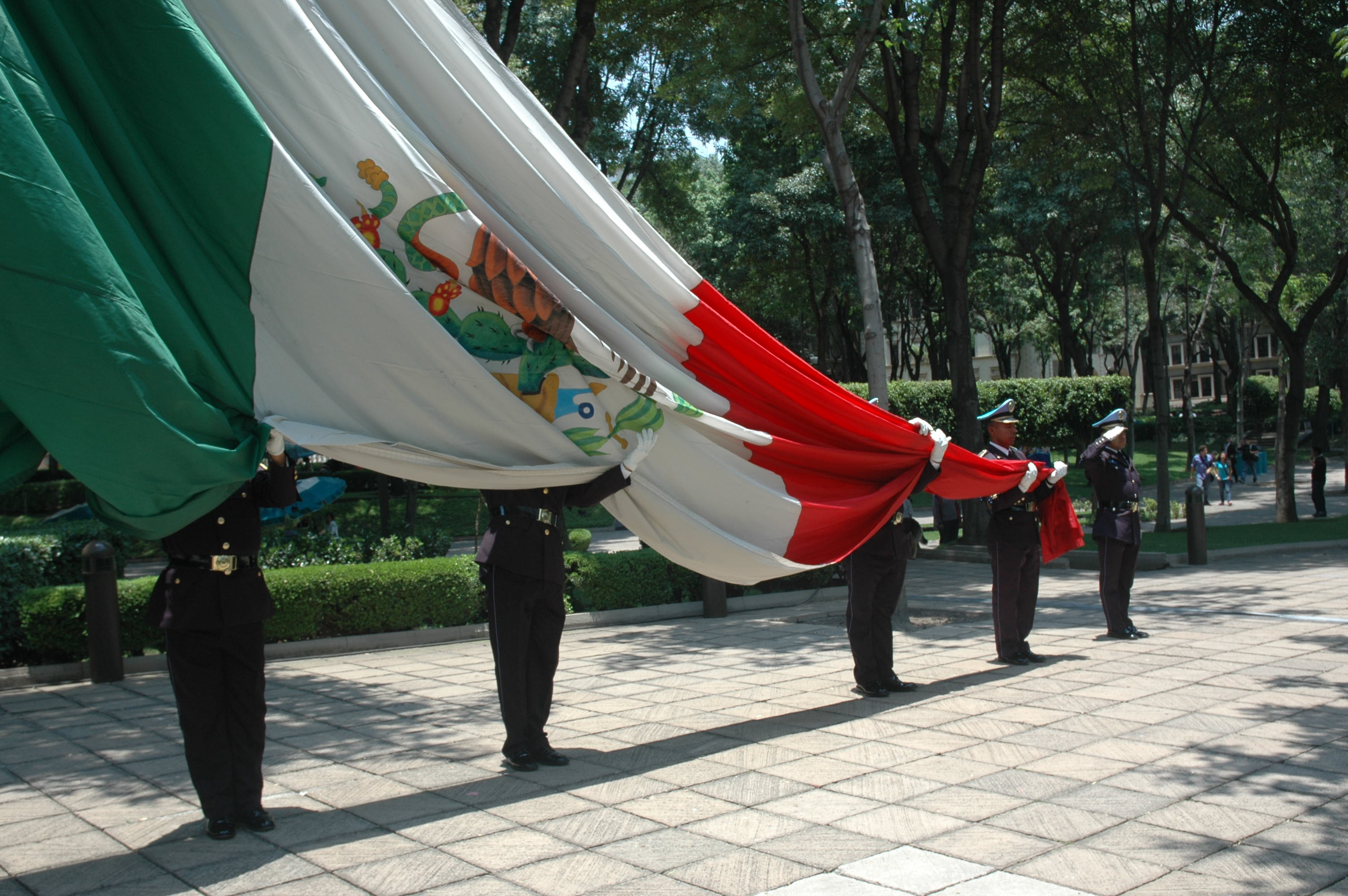
Raising of a monumental flag during a ceremony at the Monterrey Institute of Technology and Higher Education, Mexico City

In 1999, President of Mexico Ernesto Zedillo started a program erecting giant flags across the country. Directed by the Secretariat of National Defense, the banderas monumentales (monumental flags) were placed in various cities and spots, most of which are of great significance to the nation. In a decree issued on 1 July 1999, by Zedillo, the flags were to be placed in Mexico City, Tijuana, Ciudad Juárez, and Veracruz. The decree also stipulated for the flags to measure 14.3 by 25 meters (47 by 82 ft), which are raised on flag poles that are 50 meters (160 ft) high. After these initial monumental flags were created, cities such as Ensenada, Nuevo Laredo and Cancún were reported to have their own monumental flags. Smaller flags, called banderas semi-monumentales, have been erected in smaller towns and at various educational institutes.

As of 22 December 2010, the biggest Mexican flag in the world is now located in Piedras Negras, Coahuila. Located at the Gran Plaza (Great Plaza) right across from International Bridge I connecting Piedras Negras with Eagle Pass, Texas. The pole is 120 meters (390 ft) in height and weighs 160 tonnes (180 short tons) making it the tallest one in Latin America and one of the tallest in the world. The flag measures 60 by 34 meters (197 by 112 ft) and weighs 420 kilograms (930 lb).

Mexico's first largest monumental flag was the one located at the Mirador del Obispado in Monterrey city with a pole of 120 tonnes (130 short tons) and 100.6 meters (330 ft) in height. The flag measures 50 by 28.6 meters (164 by 94 ft) and weighs 230 kilograms (510 lb), four times the size of most other monumental flags at the time. It is located at the top of the Cerro del Obispado (Bishopric Hill) at an altitude of 775 meters (2,543 ft) above the sea level (city's altitude 538 meters or 1,765 feet).

== See also ==
- List of Mexican flags
- State flags of Mexico
- Flag flying days in Mexico
- National symbols of Mexico
- Himno Nacional Mexicano
- Coat of arms of Mexico
- Flag of Italy
