= Flag Day in Mexico =

Commemoration of the Mexican flag

Día de la Bandera
- Official name: Día de la Bandera
- Also called: Flag day
- Observed by: Mexico
- Celebrations: Celebrate past and current flags
- Date: February 24
- Next time: 24 February 2027
- Duration: 2 day
- Frequency: annual

Día de la Bandera ("Flag Day") is a national holiday in Mexico dedicated to the flag of Mexico. Flag Day is celebrated every year on February 24 since its implementation in 1934. It was established by the President of Mexico, General Lázaro Cárdenas, in front of the monument to General Vicente Guerrero; Guerrero was the first to pledge allegiance to the Mexican flag, on March 12, 1821.

== History ==
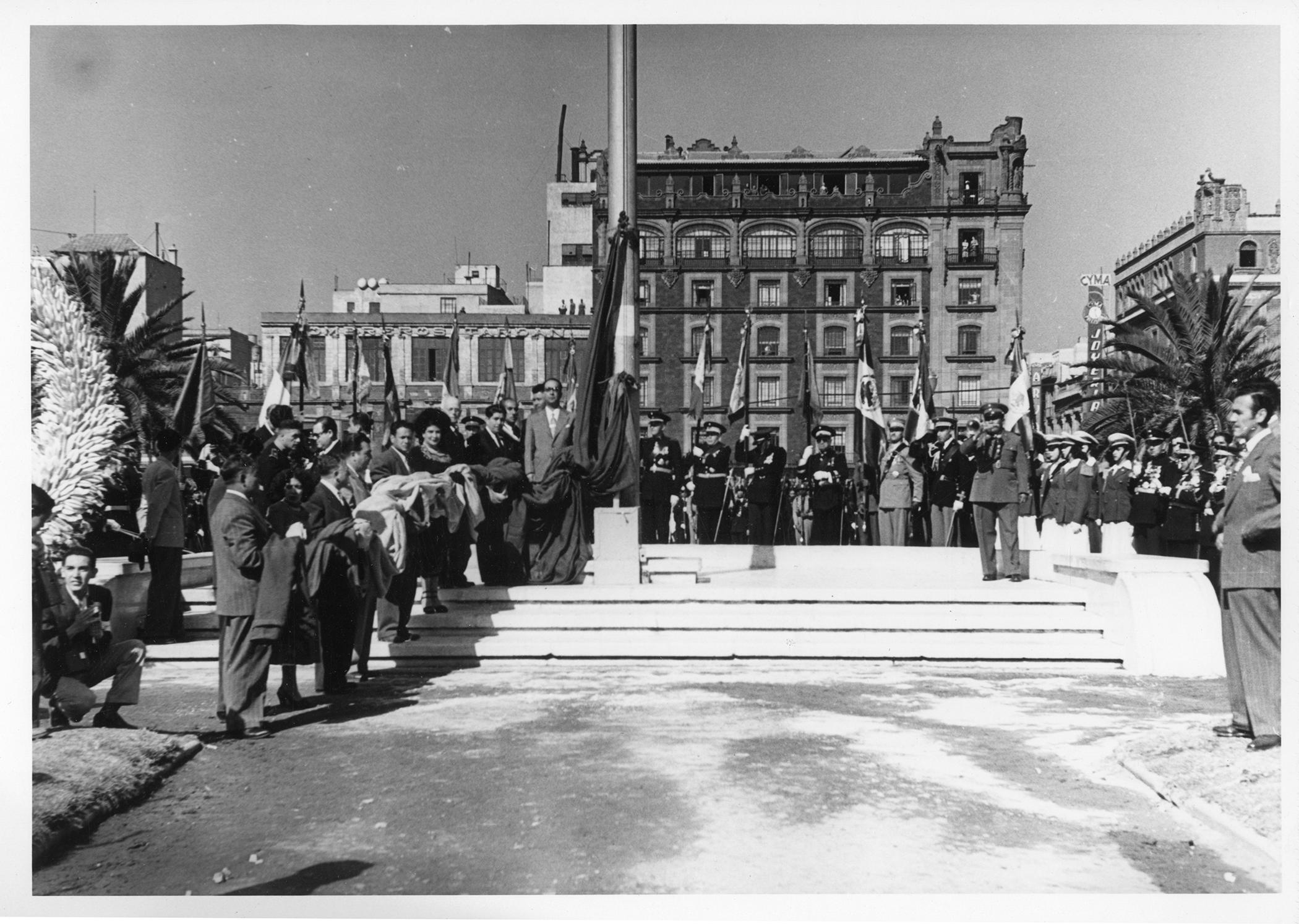
Flag Day celebrations in Mexico City, 24 February 1950

The date was selected because more than a century earlier, on February 24, 1821, the Plan de Iguala, or Plan de las Tres Garantías, was proclaimed by Agustín de Iturbide and General Vicente Guerrero. The plan was based on three principles: religion, independence and unity, which were represented by the flag's colors. On this same date, Jose Magdaleno Ocampo tailored the first three color flag for what would soon be an independent Mexico. This flag, commonly known as the "Pendón Trigarante", had the colors: white, green and red in that order, arranged diagonally with three eight-pointed gold stars, one in the center of each color banner.

Flag Day was established on February 24, 1934, with legislation passing that year regulating the national symbols of Mexico. It did not become an official holiday until 1940, following a decree by Lázaro Cárdenas.

== Observance of Flag Day ==
Honors to the flag are accompanied by the performance of the Toque de Bandera, a short anthem with lyrics by Xóchitl Angélica Palomino Contreras and music by Juan Pío Manzanares.

When the Pledge is recited, it is customary to salute the flag with the raised arm Bellamy salute while speaking. When the flag is being paraded, the arm is held across the chest, palm parallel to the ground.

== See also ==
- Flag flying days in Mexico
- Flag Day in other countries
