= Army of the Three Guarantees =

Insurgent army which established Mexican independence from Spain in 1821

- Ejército Trigarante, Ejército de las Tres Garantías
- The flag of the Three Guarantees as displayed at the General Archive of the Nation in Mexico City
- Army commander: Agustín de Iturbide
- Guerrilla commander: Vicente Guerrero
- Dates active: February 25, 1821
- Groups: Mexican royalist troops; Mexican insurgent troops
- Ideology: Nationalism; Anti-Imperialism; Independence; Sovereigntism; Decolonization
- Size: 16,000
- Wars: Mexican War of Independence Spanish American Wars of Independence

At the end of the Mexican War of Independence, the Army of the Three Guarantees (Spanish: Ejército Trigarante or Ejército de las Tres Garantías) was the name given to the army after the unification of the Spanish troops led by Agustín de Iturbide and the Mexican insurgent troops of Vicente Guerrero, consolidating Mexico's independence from Spain. The decree creating this army appeared in the Plan de Iguala, which stated the three guarantees which it was meant to defend were religion, independence and unity. Mexico was to be a Catholic empire, independent from Spain, and united against its enemies.

== History ==
The Army of the Three Guarantees was created on February 24, 1821, and continued battling Spanish royalist forces, which refused to accept Mexican independence. These battles continued until August 1821, when Iturbide and Spanish Viceroy Juan O'Donojú signed the Treaty of Córdoba, virtually ratifying Mexico's independence. The Army was a decisive force during the Battle of Azcapotzalco. The victory in this last battle of the war cleared the way to Mexico City. On September 27, 1821, the Army of the Three Guarantees triumphantly entered Mexico City, led by Iturbide. The following day Mexico was declared independent. By that time, the Army of the Three Guarantees was composed of 7,616 infantrymen, 7,755 cavalry, and 763 artillery with 68 cannons.

== Generals ==
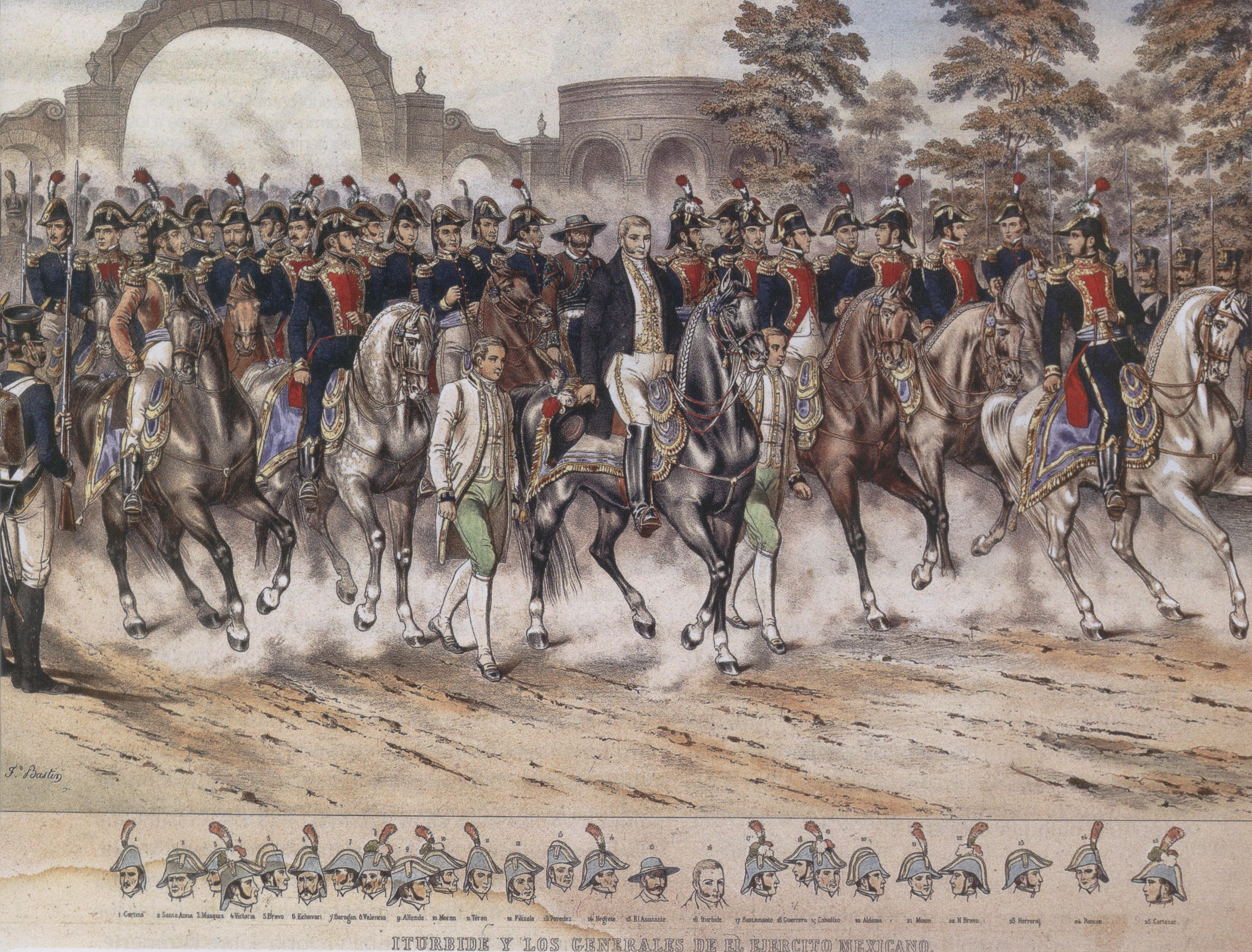
Generals of the Army of the Three Guarantees (left to right), a painting by Ferdinand Bastin.: Toribio Cortina; Antonio López de Santa Anna; Melchor Múzquiz; Guadalupe Victoria; Leonardo Bravo; José Antonio de Echávarri; Miguel Barragán; Vicente Valencia; Ignacio Allende; José Morán y del Villar; Laureano José Terán; Vicente Filísola; Mariano Paredes y Arrillaga; Pedro Celestino Negrete; Agustín de Iturbide; Anastasio Bustamante; Vicente Guerrero; Valentín Canalizo; Juan Aldama y González; Juan José Miñón; Nicolás Bravo; Fray Luis de Herrera; Manuel Rincón; Luis Cortázar Rábago

== See also ==
- Flag of the Three Guarantees
