= Coat of arms of Mexico =

National symbol

Coat of arms of Mexico Escudo Nacional de México

Versions
- Seal of the Government of Mexico

- Black and White Version of the Seal of the Government of Mexico (Linear)
- Armiger: United Mexican States
- Adopted: 16 September 1968 (latest version, by Francisco Eppens Helguera)
- Shield: Atop a nopal pedestal, a Mexican golden eagle devouring a rattle snake, all proper
- Supporters: Oak and laurel leaves, all proper

The coat of arms of Mexico (Spanish: Escudo Nacional de México, lit. "national shield of Mexico") is a national symbol of Mexico and depicts a Mexican (golden) eagle perched on a prickly pear cactus devouring a rattlesnake. The design is rooted in the legend that the Aztec people would know where to build their city once they saw an eagle eating a snake on top of a lake. The image has been an important symbol of Mexican politics and culture for centuries. To the people of Tenochtitlan, this symbol had strong religious connotations, and to the Europeans, it came to symbolize the triumph of good over evil (with the snake sometimes representative of the serpent in the Garden of Eden).

The Mexican law on the National Arms, Flag, and Anthem regulates the name, the design, and the use of the arms. There they are officially called "coat of arms" (Spanish: escudo, literally "shield"), even if there is no heraldic shield and therefore, according to the rules of heraldry, it is not a traditional "coat of arms" and more precisely a "national emblem" instead (National Emblem of Mexico). It is in the center of the flag of Mexico, is engraved on the obverse of Mexican peso coins, and is the basis of the Seal of the United Mexican States, the seal used on any official documents issued by the federal, state or municipal governmental authorities. The seal differs from the arms by the addition of the words Estados Unidos Mexicanos ("United Mexican States", the full official name of the country) in a semicircle around the upper half.

== Legend of Tenochtitlan ==
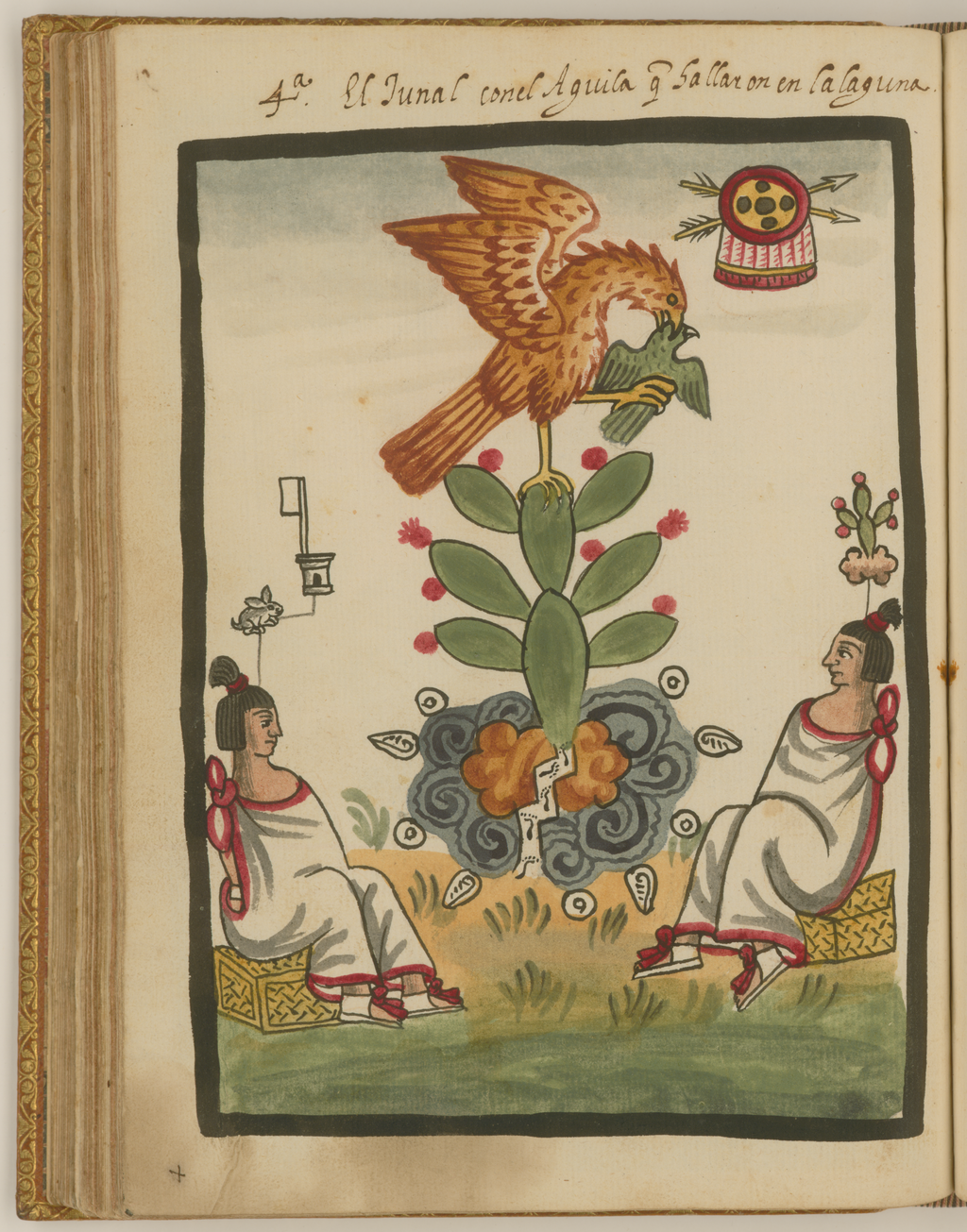
Variation of the founding myth as shown in the post-Conquest Codex Tovar, where the eagle is devouring a bird.

The coat of arms recalls the founding of Mexico City, then Tenochtitlan. The legend of Tenochtitlan, as shown in the original Aztec codices, paintings, and post-Cortesian codices, does not include a snake. While the Codex Fejérváry-Mayer depicts an eagle attacking a snake, other Mexica illustrations, such as the Codex Mendoza, show only an eagle; in the text of the Ramírez Codex, however, Huitzilopochtli asked the Tenochtitlan people to look for an eagle devouring a snake, perched on a prickly pear cactus. In the text by Chimalpahin Cuauhtlehuanitzin, the eagle is devouring something, but it is not mentioned what it is. Other versions (such as the backside of the Teocalli of the Sacred War) show the eagle clutching the Aztec symbol of war, the atl-tlachinolli glyph, or "burning water".

Coat of arms on the Mexican passport

Moreover, the original meanings of the symbols were different in numerous ways. The eagle was a representation of the sun god Huitzilopochtli, who was very important, as the Mexicas referred to themselves as the "People of the Sun". The cactus (Opuntia ficus-indica), full of its fruits, called nōchtli in Nahuatl, represents the island of Tenochtitlan. To the Mexicans, the snake represented wisdom, and it had strong connotations with the god Quetzalcoatl. The story of the snake was derived from an incorrect translation of the Crónica Mexicáyotl by Fernando Alvarado Tezozómoc. In the story, the Nahuatl text ihuan cohuatl izomocayan "the snake hisses" was mistranslated as "the snake is torn". Based on this, Father Diego Durán reinterpreted the legend so that the eagle represents all that is good and right, while the snake represents evil and sin. Despite its inaccuracy, the new legend was adopted because it conformed with European heraldic tradition. To the Europeans, it would represent the struggle between good and evil. Although this interpretation does not conform to pre-Columbian traditions, it was an element that could be used by the first missionaries for evangelism and the conversion of the native peoples.

== Symbolism ==
=== Creatures ===
Mexico City Municipality shield of colonial origin, in use from 1523 until its demise in 1929, is the first version of the current Mexican arms.

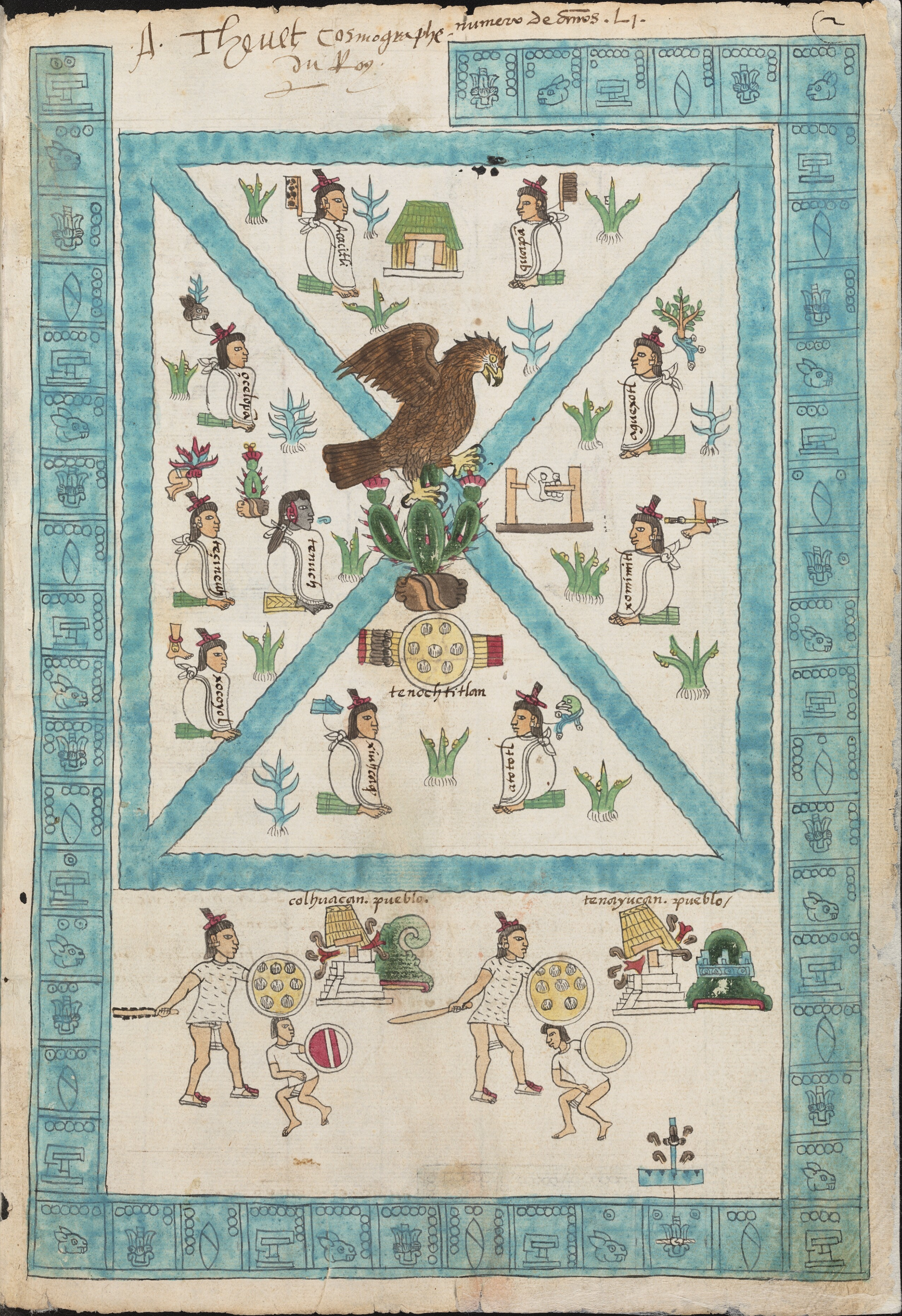
Depiction of founding myth from the post-Conquest Mendoza Codex.

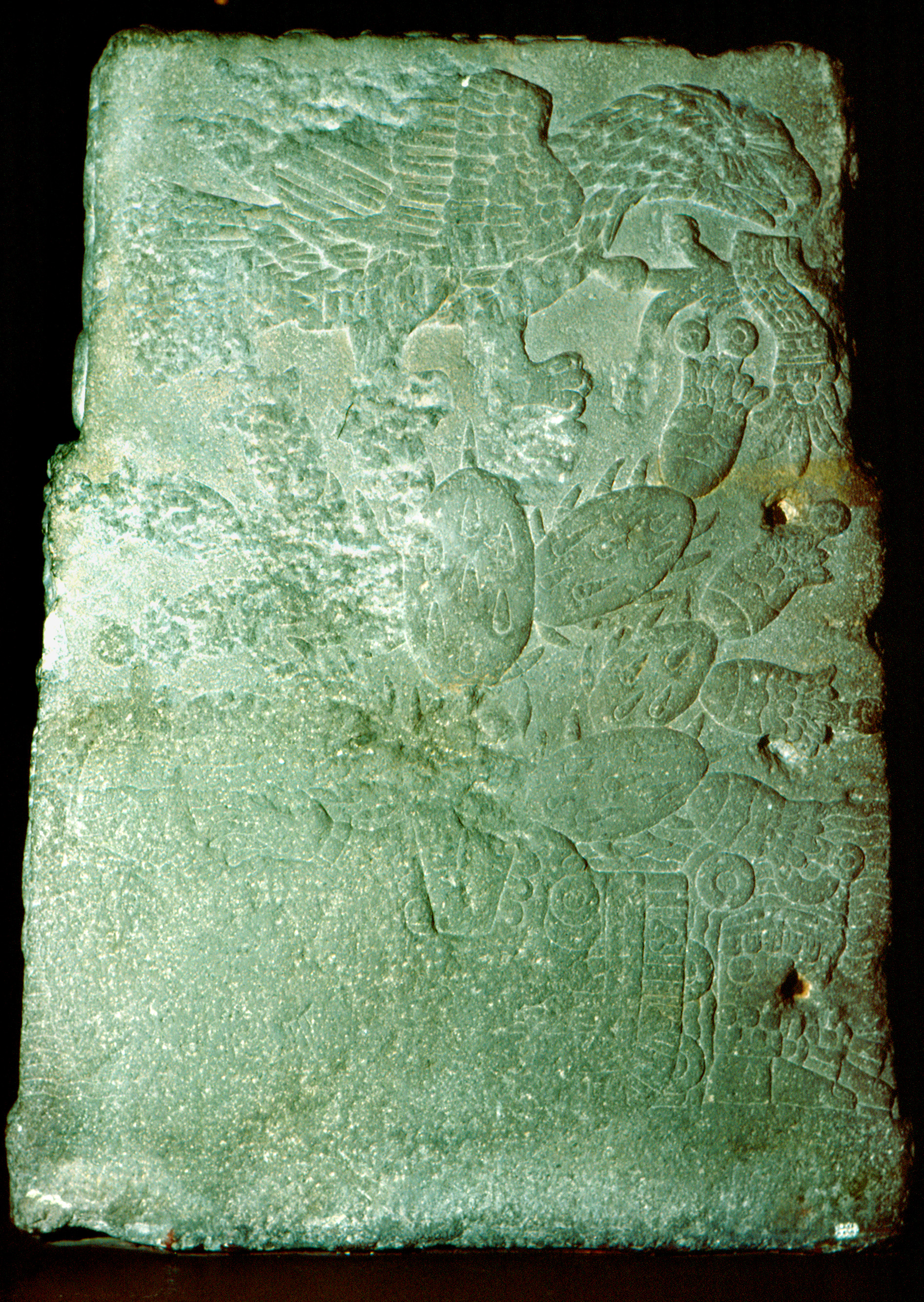
Teocalli of the Sacred War sculpted in 1325

In 1960, the Mexican ornithologist Rafael Martín del Campo identified the eagle in the pre-Hispanic codex as the crested caracara or "quebrantahuesos" (bonebreaker), a species common in Mexico (although the name "eagle" is taxonomically incorrect, as the caracara is in the falcon family). The golden eagle is considered the official bird of Mexico. When Father Durán introduced the snake, it was originally an aquatic serpent. But in 1917, the serpent was changed to be a rattlesnake, because it was more common than the aquatic varieties in pre-Hispanic illustrations. As a result of this, the design and color of the snake on the modern coat of arms do not correspond with those of any species of snake, and were inspired by the representations of Quetzalcoatl, a rattlesnake with quetzal feathers.

=== Elements ===
- The eagle, in a combative stance
- The snake, held by a talon and the beak of the eagle
- The nopal on which the eagle stands; The nopal bears some of its fruits (tunas)
- The pedestal, on which the nopal grows, is the Aztec glyph for rock, and is immersed in the Aztec glyph for water
- Oak and laurel leaves encircling the eagle cluster; tied together with a ribbon with the Mexican flag's colors

=== Pictography ===
- The emblem can be interpreted on at least two levels of abstraction. First, the pictographic/logographic depiction of the name of the Aztec's capital city, Tenochtitlan, spelled by rebus as te 'rock' and noch cactus fruit arranged as -ti-tlan, a ligatured locative suffix meaning 'below/among/at the base of.' On another level, it represents one of the most important cosmological beliefs of the Aztec culture.
- The emblem shows an eagle devouring a serpent, which actually conflicts with Mesoamerican beliefs. The eagle is a symbol of the sun and a representation of the victorious god Huitzilopochtli, in which form, according to legend, he bowed to the arriving Aztecs. The snake is a symbol of the earth and, in certain pre-Hispanic traditions, a representation of Quetzalcoatl; more specifically, in Aztec (Mexica) tradition, the snake is the representation of Coatlicue, the personification of earth and mother of Huitzilopochtli. In some codices, the eagle holds the glyph for war to represent the victorious Huitzilopochtli. This glyph, the Atl tlachinolli, which means "water and flame", has a certain resemblance to a snake, and may plausibly be the origin of this confusion.
- The fruit of the nopal cactus, called tuna, represents the heart of Copil, the nephew of the god Huitzilopochtli. The god ordered the people to "build the city in the place of Copil's heart" (Ramírez Codex), where the cactus grew on his land. It also alludes to the human sacrifice customs of the Aztecs.

=== Derivatives ===
The seal of New Mexico includes the eagle, snake, and cactus of the Mexican seal, sheltered or dominated by a larger bald eagle, representing New Mexico's history as part of Mexico and its later status as part of the United States. After the territory of New Mexico was admitted to the Union in 1912, a commission examining the new state's symbols recommended that both the "American" and "Mexican" eagles be North American golden eagles, but instead it uses an American bald eagle for the United States and a harpy eagle for Mexico.

== Chronology ==
=== Regional government ===
1. The Aztecs, who probably adopted the custom from the Toltecs, used flags to organize and coordinate their warriors in battle. The flags or pantli were made out of different colored feathers and displayed the personal coat of arms of the officer carrying them. During the battle, the flags were carried on the back to allow mobility and to display prominently the prestige of the warrior. Bernal Díaz del Castillo states that Hernán Cortés defeated the Aztecs in Otumba by knocking the flag off the Aztec general. The Aztec warriors thought that the general had been taken prisoner and thus fled the battleground. Aztec rivals, especially the kingdoms of Tlaxcala and Michoacán, had their own coat of arms. For a few months, after the deposition of Cuauhtémoc, the last Aztec emperor, Cortés governed Mexico as a virtual sovereign. Therefore, it could be said that his coat of arms was the official one in Mexico. His personal insignia bore the image of the Virgin Mary. It is known that he carried his insignia throughout the conquest of Mexico.
2. From 1521 to 1821, the coat of arms of New Spain, as Mexico was known, was the Cross of Burgundy. It was always displayed alongside the coat of arms of Spain.
3. In 1581, Father Durán drew his version of the foundation of Mexico in his book about Mexico; the snake was included for the first time. It would become a common icon, but it would still not be used as a coat of arms.
4. In 1810, Father Miguel Hidalgo, leader of the first stage of the Independence war, used the Virgin of Guadalupe as a flag or estandarte. It was seized from the parish of Atotonilco. The flag is displayed in the National Museum of History alongside and with the same rank as later Mexican flags. In that sense, this religious image could be officially regarded as the first Mexican coat of arms.
5. In 1812, the second stage of the Independence War, José María Morelos y Pavón used a crowned eagle standing atop three arches and a cactus. In small print inside the arches was the acronym "VVM", which stands for "Viva la Virgen María" (or, Long Live the Virgin Mary). In large print and surrounding the eagle, there are golden letters with the legend "OCVLIS ET VNGVIBUS AEQVE VICTRIX", meaning "BY HER EYES AND GRIP EQUALLY VICTORIOUS".
6. In 1821, Agustín de Iturbide, the first Emperor of Mexico, introduced a royal crown on the eagle as a symbol of his empire. The elements were drawn in a European style; the eagle was drawn in a front view.
7. In 1823, with a design by José Mariano Torreblanca, the crown was removed, and new elements from European tradition were introduced to celebrate the victory of the Republic. The coat of arms was now official and began to be used on coins, stamps, seals, and official papers. Many variants of this design can be found, as it was not defined by law until 1917.
8. In 1863, Maximilian I of Mexico, the second emperor of Mexico, reintroduced the royal crown, and the coat of arms was surrounded by the imperial mantle with the motto Religión, Independencia ("Religion, Independence").
9. In 1865, a second version was made for Maximilian, in which the imperial crown disappeared and two glyphs were introduced with the motto Equidad en la Justicia ("Equity in Justice").
10. In 1867, after the fall of the Second Mexican Empire, the Republic restored most of the elements of the 1823 version.
11. In 1887, President Porfirio Díaz made changes to the eagle so that its overall appearance reflected the French style.
12. In 1916, President Venustiano Carranza reversed the changes made by Díaz, and restored some of the original Aztec symbols: the water snake was replaced with a rattlesnake, and the eagle was now seen in a side view instead of a front view. This design was created by the artists Antonio Gómez and Jorge Enciso. However, due to the political problems of the time, it was not made official until 1932, under President Abelardo L. Rodríguez.
13. In 1968, President Gustavo Díaz Ordaz ordered a small change, so the eagle would look more aggressive. This design, by the painter Francisco Eppens Helguera, is still used today. Also, a law was made to define and control the use of the national symbols.
14. In 1984, President Miguel de la Madrid Hurtado enacted the current law governing the official design and usage of the national symbols, among them the coat of arms. (The coat of arms also forms the center of the Mexican flag.)
15. In the official documents of the Mexican government secretariates during Vicente Fox's presidency (2000–2006), the images of the head of the eagle and the snake appear coming up from a stripe. The detractors of the Fox administration called this image El Águila Mocha – literally "the slashed eagle" but colloquially also "the prudish eagle", referring to Fox's government links with the religious right (mocho can mean both "mutilated" and "reactionary").
16. In 2006, President Felipe Calderón adopted the complete coat of arms for official documents and rejected the "slashed eagle".

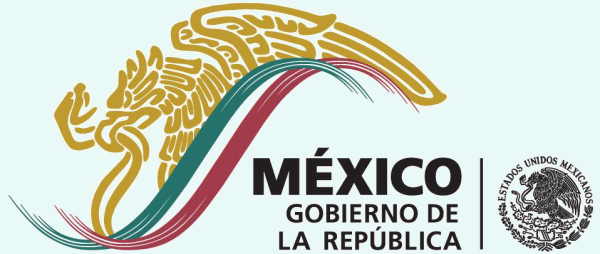

- National
- Non-National

Coat of arms of Mexico
Sovereign Mexico-Tenochtitlan Prehispanic Mesoamerica - Valley of Mexico - Aztec Triple Alliance (from 1428) 1325 — 1521
circa 1325 13 August 1521
Colonial Mexico Northern America - New Spain - Mexican America 1521 — 1821
13 August 1521 7 March 1525
7 March 1525 9 December 1528
9 December 1528 24 February 1530
24 February 1530 17 April 1535
17 April 1535 27 September 1821
Sovereign Mexico Mexican Nation - Mexican Empire Mexican Republic - United Mexican States 1821 — present
2 November 1821 14 April 1823
14 April 1823 15 July 1864
15 July 1864 19 June 1867
19 June 1867 1 April 1893
1 April 1893 20 September 1916
20 September 1916 5 February 1934
5 February 1934 16 September 1968
16 September 1968 Present

== See also ==
- Flag of Mexico
- List of Mexican flags
- National symbols of Mexico
- Seal of New Mexico
