= 1824 in music =

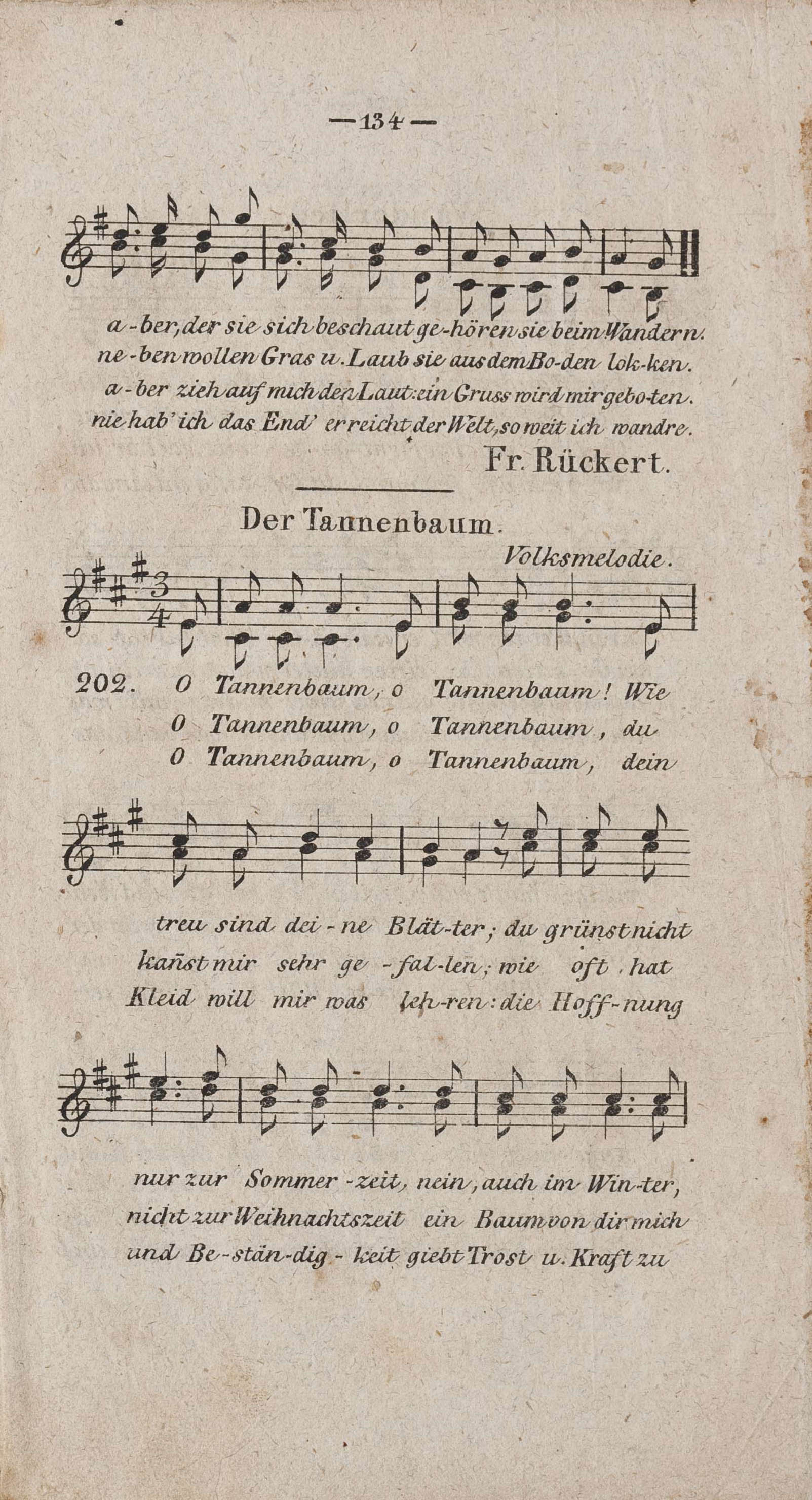
"Der Tannenbaum" (O Tannenbaum) in the school songbook by Ernst Anschütz., published 1824

This article is about music-related events in 1824.

== Events ==
- May 7 – First performance of Beethoven's Symphony No. 9 (the "Choral") at the Theater am Kärntnertor in Vienna.
- June 21 – Franz Liszt makes his London debut. Muzio Clementi, Ferdinand Ries, Friedrich Kalkbrenner and Cipriani Potter are in the audience.
- Baluswami Dikshitar (brother of Muthuswami Dikshitar) is appointed State Vidwan of Ettayapuram.
- Franz Liszt commences theory lessons with Antonin Reicha and composition lessons with Ferdinando Paer.
- First Norfolk and Norwich Festival held in England

== Popular Music ==
- Robert Stephen Hawker – "The Song of the Western Men"
- "O Tannenbaum" lyrics published by Ernst Anschutz

== Classical music ==
- Ludwig van Beethoven
  - Missa Solemnis
  - Symphony No. 9 in D minor "Choral"
- Hector Berlioz – Messe solennelle
- Ferdinando Carulli – 18 Petits morceaux, Op. 211
- Frederic Chopin – Mazurka Op. 7 No. 4
- Johann Baptist Cramer – Piano Sonata in D minor, Op. 63
- Carl Czerny – Piano Sonata Nos.3, 4, and 5, Op. 57, 65 and 76
- Friedrich Ernst Fesca – String Quartet, Op.34
- Fanny Hensel – Sonata for Piano in C minor
- Johann Nepomuk Hummel – Introduction et rondo brillant, Op. 98
- Friedrich Kuhlau
  - 3 Grand Solos, Op. 57
  - 3 Sonatinas, Op. 59
  - 3 Sonatas with Variations, Op. 60
- Kaspar Kummer – Flute Trio, Op. 24
- Maximilian Joseph Leidesdorf – Horn Sonata, Op. 164
- Felix Mendelssohn
  - Symphony No. 1 in C minor, Op. 11
  - Concerto for 2 pianos
- Bernhard Molique – Flute Concerto, Op. 69
- George Onslow
  - Piano Trio No.8, Op. 26
  - Piano Trio No.9, Op. 27
- Antoine Reicha – 6 Piano Trios, Op. 101
- Ferdinand Ries – Rule Britannia, Op. 116
- Franz Schubert: List of compositions by Franz Schubert (1824), D 799–822, including:
  - Octet, D 803
  - String Quartet No. 13, D 804 (Rosamunde)
  - String Quartet No. 14, D 810 (Death and the Maiden)
  - Sonata in C major for piano four-hands, D 812
  - "Gebet", D 815
  - Arpeggione Sonata, D 821 (Grand Duo)

== Opera ==
- Gaetano Donizetti – L'ajo nell'imbarazzo
- Friedrich Kuhlau – Lulu
- Giacomo Meyerbeer – Il crociato in Egitto
- Waldemar Thrane – Fjeldeventyret ("The mountain adventure")
- Nicola Vaccai
  - Pietro il grande (première January 17 at Teatro Ducale, Parma)
  - La pastorella feudataria (première September 18 at Teatro Carignano, Turin)

== Births ==
- January 22 – Josef Leopold Zvonař, composer, music teacher and critic (d. 1865)
- March 2 – Bedřich Smetana, composer (d. 1884)
- March 7 – Robert Ambrose, organist and composer (d. 1908)
- April 22 – Richard Wüerst, composer and music teacher (d. 1881)
- June 13 – Julius Eichberg, composer (d. 1893)
- June 23 – Carl Reinecke, pianist, conductor and composer (d. 1910)
- August 1 – John P. Ordway, doctor, composer, music entrepreneur and politician (d. 1880)
- August 19 – Georg Goltermann, cellist and composer (d. 1898)
- September 4 – Anton Bruckner, composer (d. 1896)
- September 8 – Jaime Nunó, composer of the Mexican national anthem (d. 1908)
- November 25 – Antonio Ghislanzoni, librettist (d. 1893)
- December 24 - Peter Cornelius, composer, writer, translator (d. 1874)
- date unknown
  - François Xavier Bazin, bow-maker (d. 1865)
  - Frederick Ellard, composer (d. 1874)
  - Velvel Zbarjer, Brody singer (d. 1884)
  - Charlotta Norberg, ballerina (d. 1892)

== Deaths ==
- January 7 – Faustino Arévalo, hymnographer (born 1747)
- February 1 – Maria Theresia von Paradis, musician and composer (born 1759)
- March 3 – Giovanni Battista Viotti, violinist and composer (born 1755)
- April 18 – Edward Jones, royal harpist (born 1752)
- June 21 – Étienne Aignan, opera librettist (born 1773)
- September 16 – Giacomo Tritto, opera composer (born 1733)
- December 5 – Anne Louise Boyvin d'Hardancourt Brillon de Jouy, harpsichordist (born 1744)
- date unknown
  - Nicolas Lupot, luthier (born 1758)
  - Alexander Uber, cellist and composer (born 1783)
- probable – János Bihari, violinist (born 1764)
