= Uber (disambiguation) =

Uber is an American multinational ride-hailing company.

Über is a German language word meaning "over", "super", "above" or "across".

Uber, UBER, or Über may also refer to:

== Arts, entertainment and media ==
- Über (album), a 2006 album by the Norwegian black metal band Sturmgeist
- UBER, a proposed 2009 album by T-Pain
- Über (comics), a 2010s Anglo-American comic book series
- Uberfic or uber, a genre of alternate universe fan fiction

== People ==
- Alexander Uber (1783–1824), German cello virtuoso, composer, and Kapellmeister
- Betty Uber (1906–1983), English badminton player, for whom the Uber Cup was named
- Christian Benjamin Uber (1746–1812), German jurist and composer
- Friedrich Christian Hermann Uber (1781–1822), German composer
- Uber Baccilieri (1923–2007), an Italian boxer

== Other uses ==
- Uber Cup, a major international Women's badminton competition
- Uber Entertainment, an American video game development company
- UBER, short for uncorrectable bit error rate, used as a metric for data corruption rate

== See also ==
- Über alles (disambiguation)
- Unter (disambiguation), German antonym of Über
- Betula uber, the Virginia round-leaf birch tree
