= National symbols of Mexico =

National flag

The national symbols of Mexico are the flag, the most coat of arms and the anthem. The flag is a vertical tricolor of green, white, and red. The coat of arms features a golden eagle eating a snake on top of a cactus.

== National flag ==
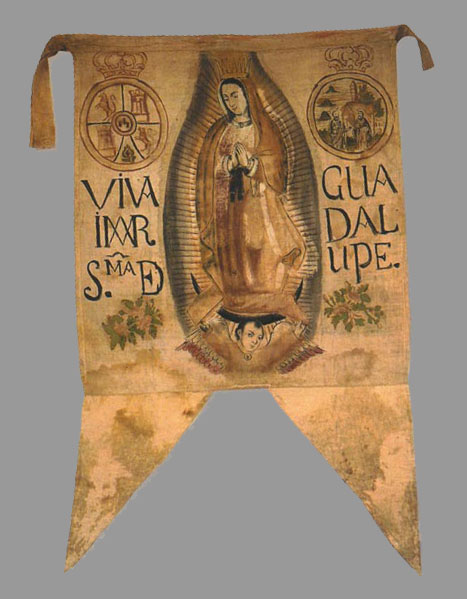
The revolutionary banner with the image of the Virgin of Guadalupe carried by Miguel Hidalgo and his insurgent army during the Mexican War of Independence

The current national flag was changed from a front-facing to a side-facing position. The current flag is a vertical tricolor of green, white, and red with the national coat of arms charged in the center of the white stripe. While the meaning of the colors has changed over time, these three colors were adopted by Mexico following independence from Spain during the country's War of Independence.

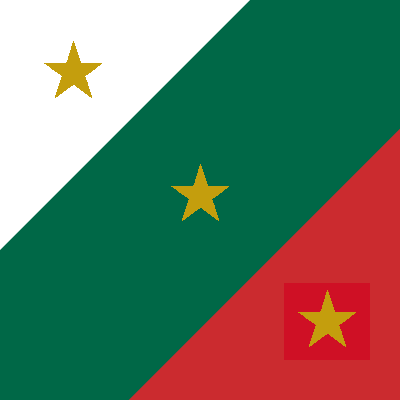
Flag of the Three Guarantees.

The colors of the flag originated from the banner of the Army of the Three Guarantees, which lasted from 1821 until 1823. Originally, the colors had the following meanings:

- Green: Independencia (independence from Spain)
- White: Religión (religion, the Roman Catholic faith)
- Red: Unión (union between the Europeans and Americans)

However, the meaning of the colors changed because of the secularization of the country, which was spearheaded by President Benito Juárez. The new color meanings are as follows:

- Green: Hope
- White: Unity
- Red: Blood of the national heroes

The World Encyclopedia of Flags, a book written by Alfred Znamierowski, also gives the following meaning to the colors of the flag:

- Green: Hope
- White: Purity
- Red: Religion

Since Article 3 of the Flag Law does not give an official symbolism to the colors, other meanings may be given to them. Other groups have used the national colors as part of their own logos or symbols. For example, the Institutional Revolutionary Party (PRI) political party has adopted the national colors as part of their logo. Another political party, the Party of the Democratic Revolution (PRD), also had the national colors as part of their logo, but changed them in the 1990s after a controversy surrounding impartiality issues, while the PRI did not. Several states, such as Querétaro and Hidalgo have incorporated either elements of the national flag, or even the entire flag, into their coats of arms.

== Coat of arms ==
The current coat of arms.

According to the official story of Mexico, the national coat of arms was inspired by an Aztec legend regarding the founding of Tenochtitlan. The Aztecs, then a nomadic tribe, were wandering throughout Mexico in search of a divine sign that would indicate the precise spot upon which they were to build their capital.

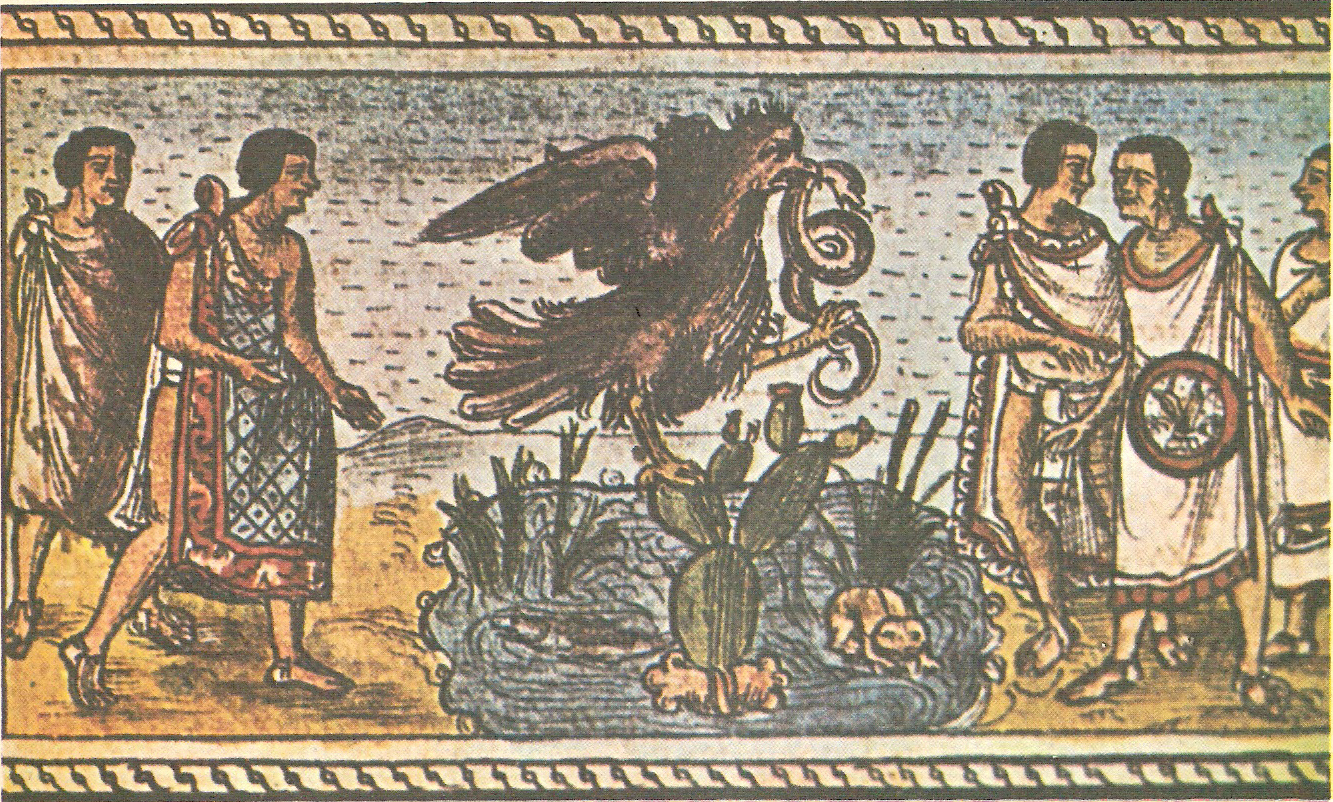
Mexico City Foundation.

A closer look at the original Aztec codices, paintings, and the post-Cortesian codices shows that there was no snake in the original legends. While the Codex Fejérváry-Mayer depicts an eagle attacking a snake, other Aztec illustrations, like the Codex Mendoza, show only an eagle, while in the text of the Ramírez Codex, Huitzilopochtli asked the Aztecs to look for an eagle devouring a snake perched on a prickly pear cactus. In the text by Chimalpahin Cuauhtlehuanitzin, the eagle is devouring something, but it is not mentioned what it is. Still other versions show the eagle clutching the Aztec symbol of war, the Atl-Tlachinolli glyph, or "burning water".

The bird featured on the Mexican coat of arms is the golden eagle. This bird is known in Spanish as águila real (literally, "royal eagle"). In 1960, the Mexican ornithologist Martín del Campo identified the eagle in the pre-Hispanic codex as a crested caracara or "quebrantahuesos", a species common in Mexico (although the name "eagle" is taxonomically incorrect, as the caracara is a type of falcon). Even so, the prickly pear cactus is considered the Mexican plant for official purposes, and for the same reason is considered the official cactus of Mexico.

== National anthem ==
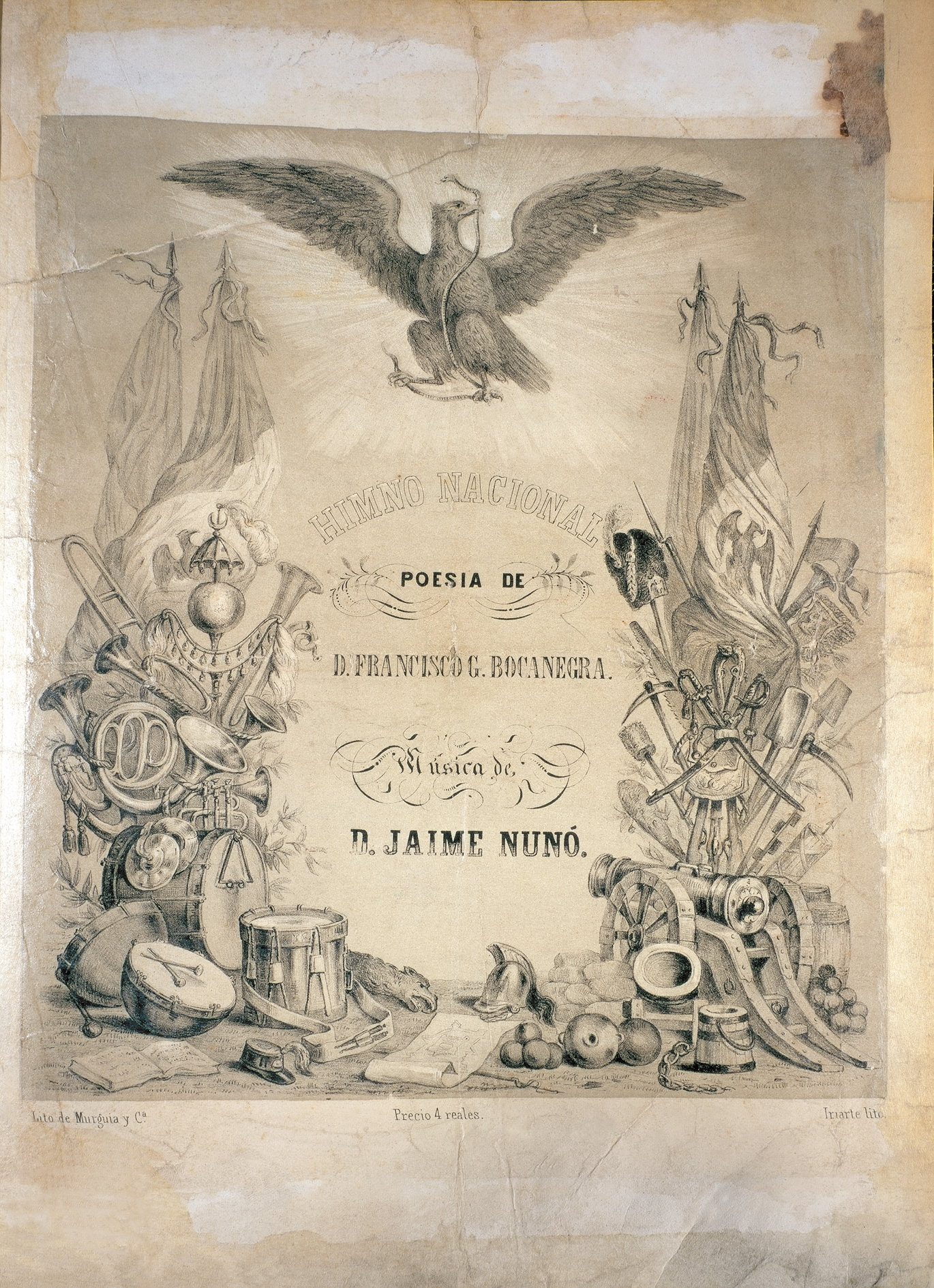
First edition of the National Anthem

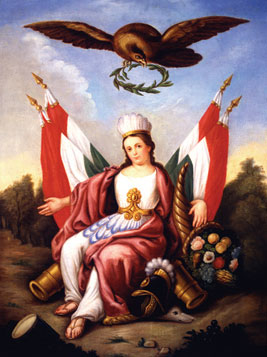
Allegory of the Mexican Homeland

The National Anthem of Mexico (Spanish: Himno Nacional Mexicano) was officially adopted in 1943. The lyrics of the national anthem, which allude to Mexican victories in the heat of battle and cries of defending the homeland, were composed by poet Francisco González Bocanegra in 1853, after his fiancée locked him in a room. From 1854 until its official adoption, the lyrics underwent several modifications due to political changes in the country. Currently the full national anthem consists of the chorus, 1st stanza, 5th stanza, 6th stanza and 10th stanza.

At the same time the lyrics were composed, a set of music was chosen, the winner was Juan Bottesini, but his entry was disliked due to aesthetics. This rejection caused a second national contest to find music for the lyrics. At the end of the second contest, Jaime Nunó, a Spanish-born band leader, arranged the music which now accompanies González's poem. The anthem, consisting of ten stanzas and a chorus, entered into use on September 16, 1854. During the second anthem competition, Nunó was the leader of several Mexican military bands. He had been invited to direct these bands by President Santa Anna, whom he had met in Cuba.

The modification of the lyrics was ordered by President Manuel Ávila Camacho in a decree printed in the Diario Oficial de la Federación. The de jure or official language of Mexico is Spanish. Nevertheless, there are still people who only speak indigenous languages. On December 8, 2005, Article 39 of the national symbols law was adopted to allow for the translation of the lyrics into the native languages. The official translation is performed by the National Institute of Indigenous Languages (Instituto Nacional de Lenguas Indígenas).

== Official logo of the government of Mexico ==
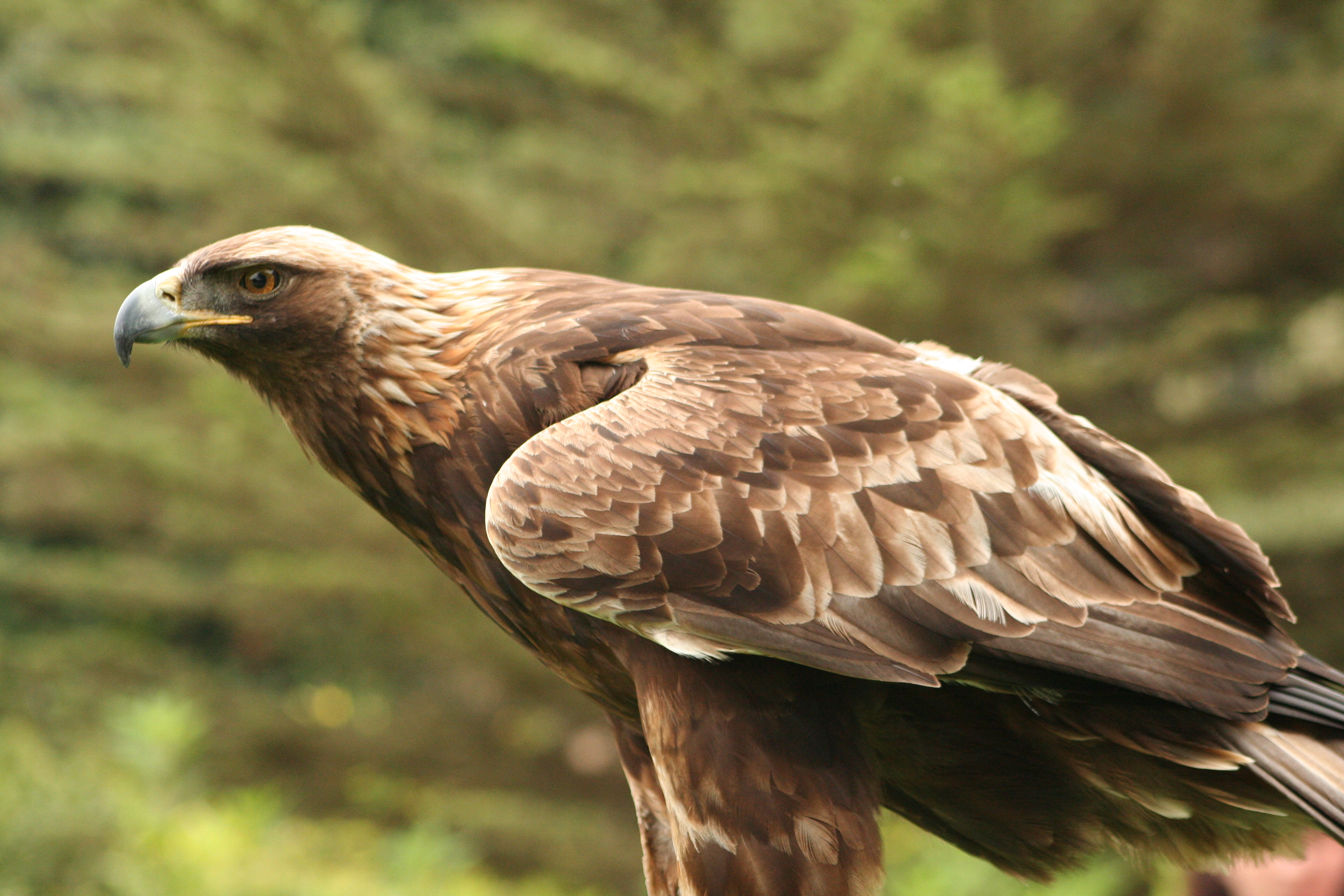
A golden eagle

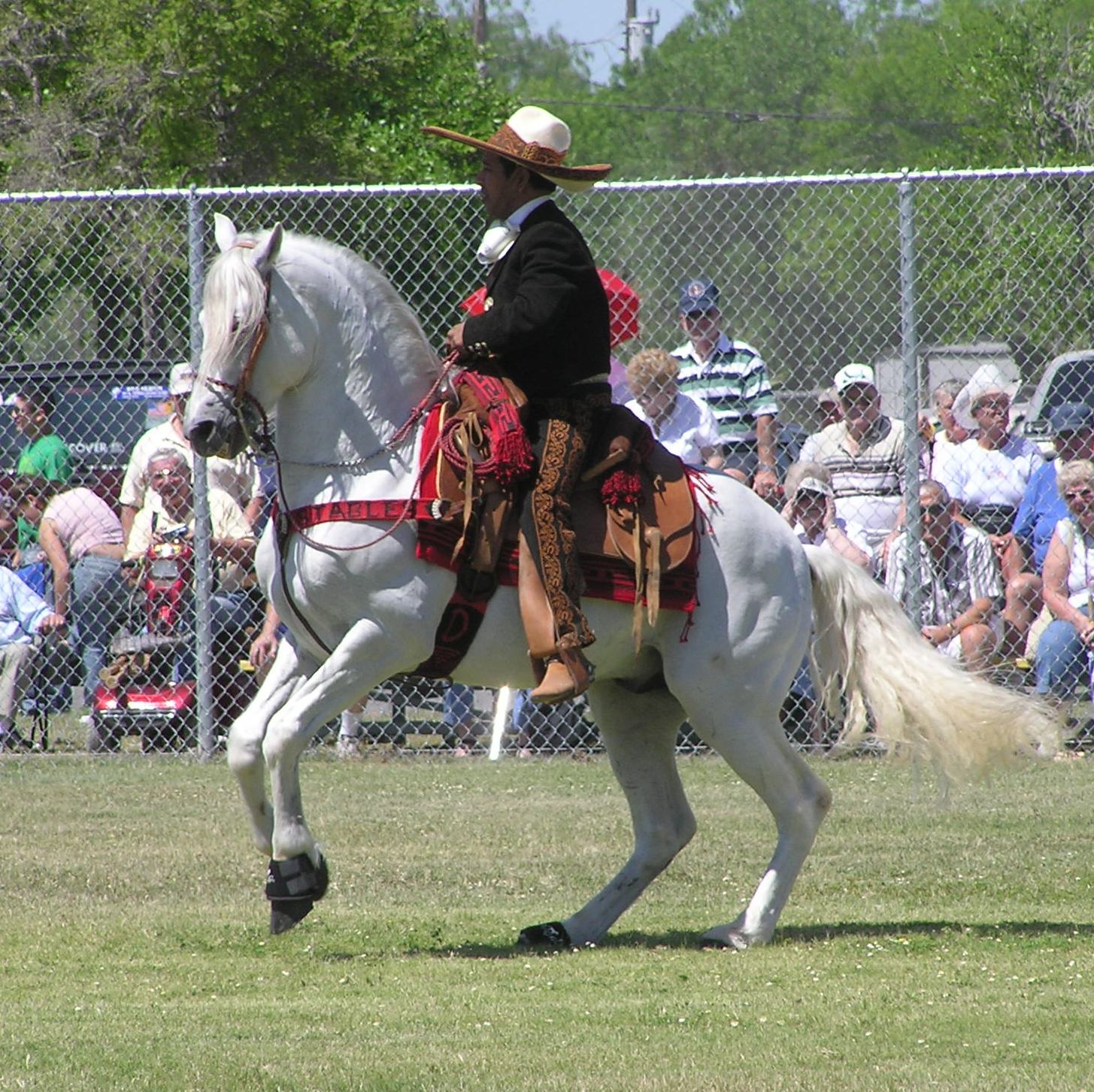
Azteca horse ridden by horse breeder. The rider is dressed in traditional "charro" attire.

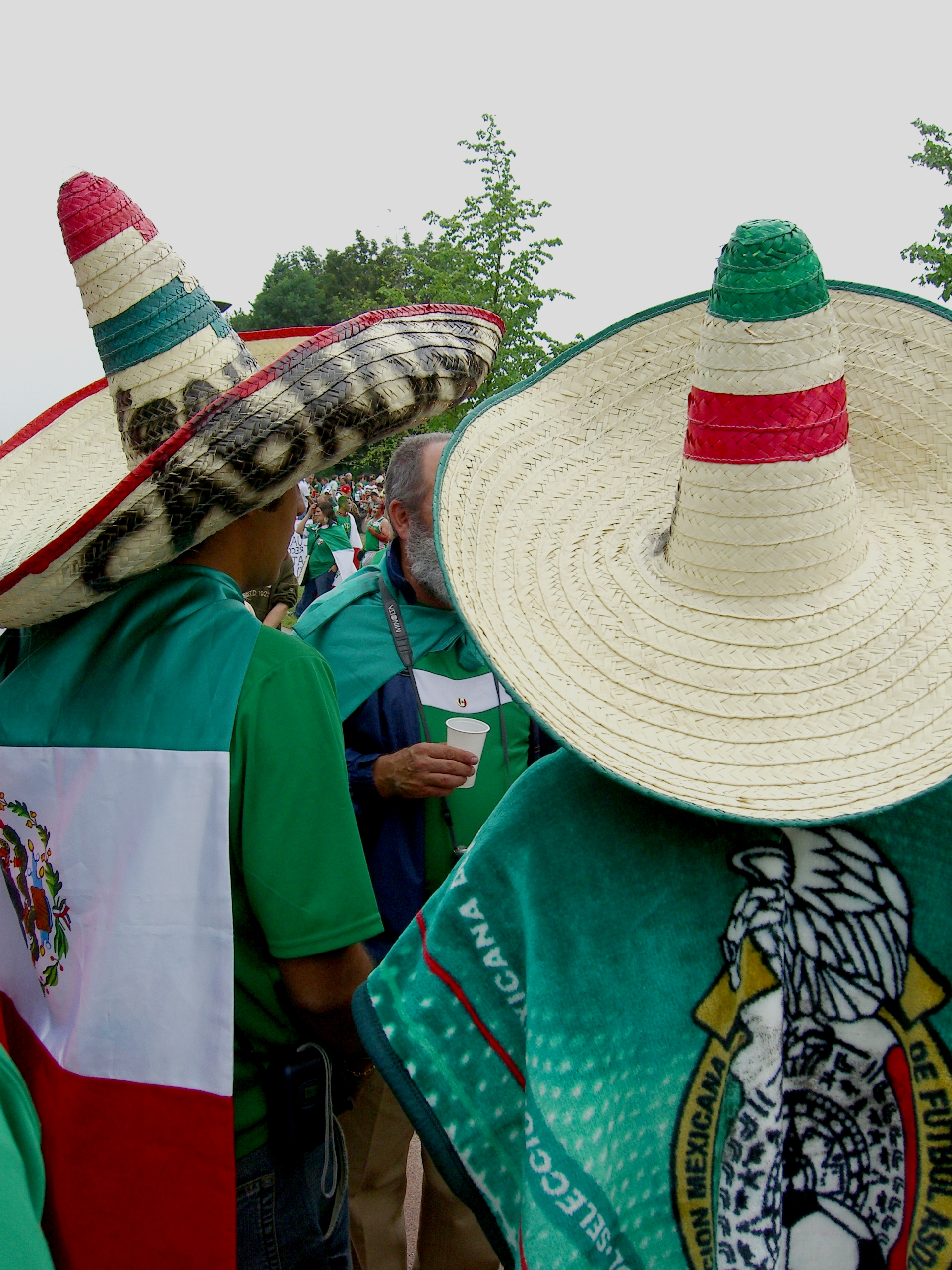
At a game.

In the image the characters appear, that López Obrador has qualified as his references on various occasions. These are Benito Juárez (1806-1872) president who faced the French and American invasion; Francisco Ignacio Madero (1873-1913), forerunner of the Mexican Revolution, and Lázaro Cárdenas (1895-1970), president who nationalized oil. Also Miguel Hidalgo (1753-1811) new Hispanic priest who started the Grito de Dolores with which the War of Independence began, and José María Morelos (1765-1815), one of the main leaders of the independence struggle.

=== Female version ===
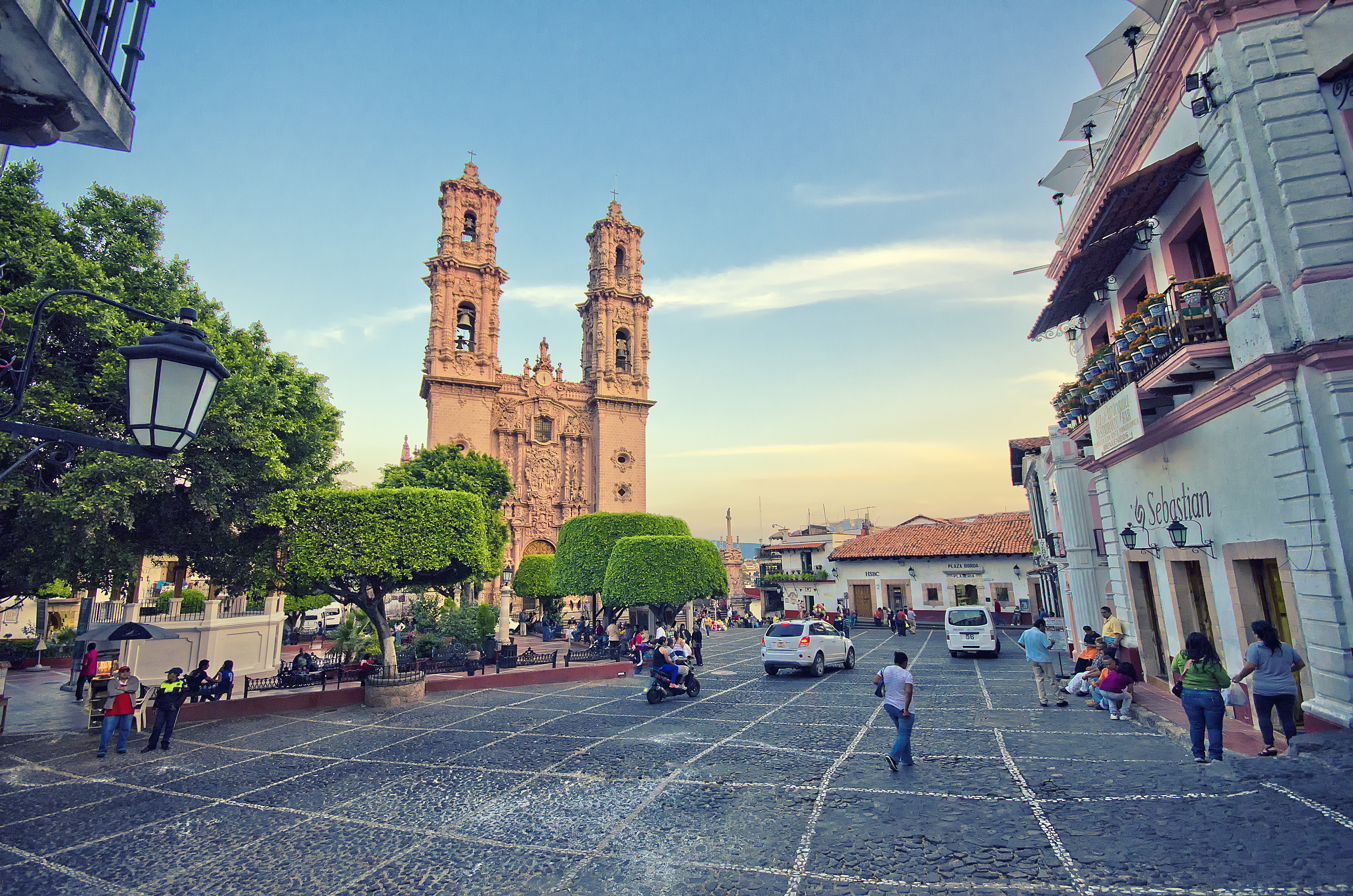
Taxco

A new official logo featuring prominent women in the country's history on the occasion of the commemoration of International Women's Day. In the green and gold logo, used in official events and in government social networks five celebrities appear on the motto "Women transforming Mexico. March, women's month." In the center of the image appears holding a Mexican flag Leona Vicario (1789-1842), one of the most outstanding figures of the Mexican War of Independence (1810-1821) who served as an informant for the insurgents from Mexico City then capital of the vice-royalty. To her left, it is also drawn Josefa Ortiz de Domínguez (1768-1829), known as "la Corregidora" who played a fundamental role in the conspiracy that gave rise to the beginning of the independence movement from the state of Querétaro. The nun and neo-Hispanic writer sister sor Juana Inés de la Cruz (1648-1695), one of the main exponents of the Golden Age of literature in Spanish thanks to her lyrical and dramatic work, both religious and profane stars in the far left of the image. On the opposite side, the revolutionary Carmen Serdán (1875-1948), is drawn, who strongly supported from the city of Puebla to Francisco Ignacio Madero in his proclamation against the dictatorship of Porfirio Díaz, which was finally overthrown in 1911. On her side is located Elvia Carrillo Puerto (1878-1968), who was a feminist leader who fought for the right to vote of women in Mexico, which was achieved in 1953 and that she became one of the first women to hold office elected when elected as a deputy in the state congress of Yucatan.
