= Cristian Canton Ferrer =

Catalan writer and musicologist

- Born: 1980 (age 45–46); Terrassa, Catalonia, Spain
- Occupations: Writer, musicologist and pianist

Cristian Canton i Ferrer (born 1980, Terrassa, Barcelona, Catalonia, Spain) is a Catalan writer, musicologist, and pianist. He is known for his contributions to the re-discovery of Catalan musicians and their legacies in America and the historical study of the Catalan migrations, which is the core of his literary production. He is also a computer scientist in the field of artificial intelligence, working as a researcher at Facebook in Seattle (WA).

== Biography ==
He received a scientific and musical education in Spain, Switzerland, Turkey, and France. His main subject of research is the migrations between Catalonia and America, and his first work, in 2010, was the biography of the Catalan musician Luis G. Jordà, highly praised in Mexico but completely forgotten in Spain. His research had made him travel frequently to Mexico, where he got in contact with high society and the cultural circles of Mexico City, especially with the pianist Silvia Navarrete and the historian Guillermo Tovar de Teresa. As a result of this collaboration, Canton found the long-lost manuscript of the Independence Cantata (Cantata Independencia) by Luis G. Jordà that had its first world premiere during the celebrations of Mexico's Independence Bicentennial.

In 2010, as part of the celebrations of Mexico's Independence Bicentennial, Canton was entrusted with the job of writing the biography of Catalan composer Jaime Nunó, author of the national anthem of Mexico, a task that entailed extensive traveling around America until he found the only living descendant of Nunó. The recovery of Nunó's personal archives allowed for the writing of the first complete biography of this composer, highlighting the importance of Catalan musicians in America. Canton is also well known for his efforts in genre studies, especially in the role of women in Latin American 19th-century music.

In 2010, Canton founded a publishing company, Mozaic Editions, with headquarters in Oxford and Barcelona. The objective of this company is to publish and promote the musical heritage of Catalan composers, mostly forgotten in Catalonia but of some prestige and renown in America. In order to fund the research activities related to Mozaic Editions, Canton donated his personal library, which contains 12,000 music scores, mainly manuscripts and first editions of Latin American composers from the 17th to 19th centuries. At the same time, Canton significantly contributed to the Catalonia-Mexico relationship through the Mexican-Catalan Society, of which he is a member. He has given numerous conferences, both in Mexico and Catalonia, revolving around the common cultural heritage of both countries.

In addition to writing and music, Canton holds a PhD in telecommunication engineering by the Technical University of Catalonia and is the author of a number of publications in the field of human-computer interaction. In 2009, he was selected to co-star in a TV spot for the Technical University of Catalonia. Among his scientific contributions, he introduced the concept of structural annealing into the field of Monte Carlo methods. During his academic years at the Technical University of Catalonia, Canton was selected, together with a team of Catalan researchers, in 2002, to collaborate with the European Space Agency in one of the first parabolic flights. The conducted experiments, supervised by Dutch astronaut Wubbo Ockels, on the capillarity effect under weightlessness conditions, proved feasible to grow plants in Lunar soil.

His publications and research have been awarded and/or supported by the Council of Les Masies de Roda (2009), the Contemporary Cultural Center of Barcelona (2010), la Casa América Cataluña (2010), the Council of Sant Joan de les Abadesses (2010), the Provincial Deputation of Girona (2010), the General Consulate of Mexico in Barcelona (2010), the Ramon Llull Institute (2011, 2012), the Consejo Nacional para la Culturay las Artes in México (2011), the National Institute of Fine Arts in Mexico (2012), among others.

Currently, he combines his musicology activities with scientific research in the field of artificial intelligence, machine learning and computer vision. In 2012, he joined Microsoft Research in Cambridge (UK) and later relocated to Seattle where he currently resides.

== Publications ==
- Cristian Canton et al. Centenario 1910 México. Ed. Fundación Conmemoraciones 2010, A.C. Sextil Editores, 2009.
- Cristian Canton. Vida i obra de Luis G. Jordà (1869–1951). El músic de les Masies de Roda que va triomfar a México. Ed. Ayuntamiento de les Masies de Roda, 2010.
- Cristian Canton y Raquel Tovar. Jaime Nunó. Un santjoaní a América. Ed. Casa América-Cataluña, 2010.
- Cristian Canton y Raquel Tovar. Jaime Nunó. Un sanjuanense en América. Ed. Casa América-Cataluña, 2010.
- Cristian Canton. Luis G. Jordà: Un músico catalán en el México porfiriano. Mozaic Editions, 2011.
- Cristian Canton. Jaume Nunó: su legado musical. Co-edition by the National Fund for Culture and Arts / National Council for Culture and Arts and Mozaic Editions, 2012.
- Cristian Canton. Músics catalans a Amèrica: amb la música a una altra banda (essay, in Catalan and Spanish), 2014 (under review).
- Cristian Canton. Un perfum tan llunyà (novel, in Catalan), 2014 (under review).
