= Himno Nacional Mexicano =

National anthem of Mexico

English: Mexican National Anthem
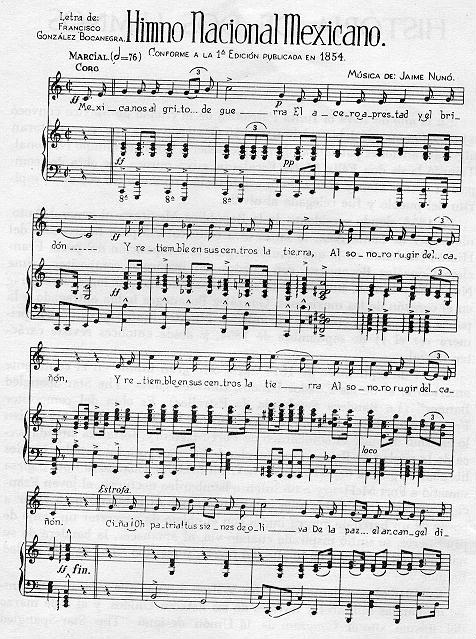
- National anthem of Mexico
- Also known as: "Mexicanos, al grito de guerra" (English: 'Mexicans, at the Cry of War')
- Lyrics: Francisco González Bocanegra, 1853
- Music: Jaime Nunó Roca, 1854
- Adopted: May 4, 1943

Audio sample
- Old orchestral and vocal recording (chorus and original 19th-century verses): file; help

The "Mexican National Anthem", (Note: Spanish: Himno Nacional Mexicano, pronounced [ˈimno nasjoˈnal mexiˈkano]; Nahuatl languages: Mexihcaletepetlacuicalt.) also known by its incipit "Mexicans, at the Cry of War", (Note: Spanish: Mexicanos, al grito de guerra, pronounced [mexiˈkanos | al ˈɣɾito ðe ˈɣera].) is the official national anthem of the United Mexican States. Its lyrics, composed by poet Francisco González Bocanegra after a national contest in 1853, allude to historical Mexican victories in battle and cries of defending the homeland. In 1854, Jaime Nunó composed the music to the lyrics after a request from González. The national anthem, consisting of ten stanzas and a chorus, effectively entered into use on September 16, 1854.

== Composition ==
c.1997 U.S. performed instrumental version
U.S. Navy Band instrumental version (chorus and one verse) in E-flat major

c.1964 band instrumental recording (chorus and eight verses)
Performed by the Banda de Artillería de la SEDENA

=== Lyrics competition ===
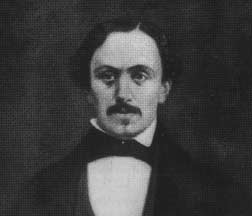
Francisco González Bocanegra, author of the lyrics

On November 12, 1853, President Antonio López de Santa Anna announced a competition to write a national anthem for Mexico. The competition offered a prize for the best poetic composition representing patriotic ideals. Francisco González Bocanegra, a talented poet, was not interested in participating in the competition. He argued that writing love poems involved very different skills from the ones required to write a national anthem. His fiancée, Guadalupe González del Pino (or Pili), had undaunted faith in her fiancé's poetic skills and was displeased with his constant refusal to participate in spite of her constant prodding and requests from their friends. Under false pretenses, she lured him to a secluded bedroom in her parents' house, locked him into the room, and refused to let him out until he produced an entry for the competition. Inside the room in which he was temporarily imprisoned were pictures depicting various events in Mexican history which helped to inspire his work. After four hours of fluent (albeit forced) inspiration, Francisco regained his freedom by slipping all ten verses of his creation under the door. After Francisco received approval from his fiancée and her father, he submitted the poem and won the competition by unanimous vote. González was announced the winner in the publication Official Journal of the Federation (DOF) on February 3, 1854.

=== Music competition ===
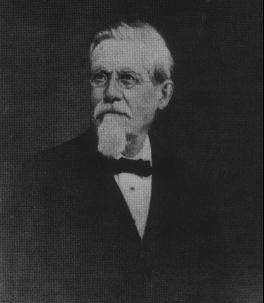
Jaime Nunó, composer of the music

A musical composition was chosen at the same time as the lyrics. The winner was Juan Bottesini, but his entry was disliked due to aesthetics. This rejection caused a second national contest to find music for the lyrics. At the end of the second contest, the music that was chosen for González's lyrics was composed by Jaime Nunó, the then Catalonian-born King of Spain's band leader. At the time of the second anthem competition, Nunó was the leader of several Mexican military bands. He had been invited to direct these bands by President Santa Anna, whom he had met in Cuba. About the time that Nunó first came to Mexico to start performing with the bands, Santa Anna was making his announcement about creating a national anthem for Mexico. Nunó's anthem music composition was made like masterpieces of classical music, with a high quality in composition, and was chosen. Out of the few musical compositions submitted, Nunó's music, titled "God and Freedom" ("Dios y libertad"), was chosen as the winner on August 12, 1854. The song was officially adopted as the Mexican national anthem on Independence Day, September 16 of that same year. The inaugural performance was directed by Juan Bottesini, sung by soprano Claudia Florenti and tenor Lorenzo Salvi at the Santa Anna Theatre.

== Lyrics ==
=== Current lyrics ===
Since 1943, the full national anthem officially consists of the chorus and the first, fifth, sixth, and tenth stanzas (with the chorus interspersed between each stanza and performed again at the end). The modification of the lyrics was ordered by President Manuel Ávila Camacho in a decree printed in the Diario Oficial de la Federación.

When the national anthem is played at sporting events such as the Olympic Games and the FIFA World Cup, an abridged form (chorus, stanza I, chorus) is used. An unofficial semi-abridged form (chorus, stanza I, chorus, stanza X, chorus) has gained some acceptance in television and radio programming.

Spanish original

Coro:
Mexicanos, al grito de guerra
El acero aprestad y el bridón,
𝄆 Y retiemble en sus centros la tierra
Al sonoro rugir del cañón. 𝄇

Ciña ¡Oh Patria! tus sienes de oliva
de la paz el arcángel divino,
que en el cielo tu eterno destino
por el dedo de Dios se escribió.
Mas si osare un extraño enemigo
profanar con su planta tu suelo,
piensa ¡oh Patria querida! que el cielo
𝄆 un soldado en cada hijo te dio. 𝄇

Coro

¡Guerra, guerra sin tregua al que intente
de la patria manchar los blasones!
¡Guerra, guerra! los patrios pendones
en las olas de sangre empapad.
¡Guerra, guerra! en el monte, en el valle,
los cañones horrísonos truenen,
y los ecos sonoros resuenen
𝄆 con las voces de ¡Unión! ¡Libertad!. 𝄇

Coro

Antes, Patria, que inermes tus hijos
bajo el yugo su cuello dobleguen,
tus campiñas con sangre se rieguen,
sobre sangre se estampe su pie.
Y tus templos, palacios y torres
se derrumben con hórrido estruendo,
y sus ruinas existan diciendo:
𝄆 de mil héroes la patria aquí fue. 𝄇

Coro

¡Patria! ¡Patria! tus hijos te juran
exhalar en tus aras su aliento,
si el clarín con su bélico acento
los convoca a lidiar con valor.
¡Para ti las guirnaldas de oliva!
¡Un recuerdo para ellos de gloria!
¡Un laurel para ti de victoria!
𝄆 ¡Un sepulcro para ellos de honor! 𝄇

Coro

IPA transcription (Note: See Help:IPA/Spanish, Spanish phonology and Mexican Spanish.)

[ˈko.ɾo]
[me.xi.ˈka.nos al ˈgɾi.to‿ðe‿ˈɣe.ra]
[el a.ˈse.ɾo‿a.pɾes.ˈtað j‿el‿βɾi.ˈðon |]
𝄆 [i re.ˈtjem.bl(e)‿en sus ˈsen.tɾoz‿la ˈtje.ra]
[al so.ˈno.ɾo ru.ˈxiɾ‿ðel ka.ˈɲon ‖] 𝄇

[ˈsi.ɲa‿o ˈpa.tɾja tus ˈsje.nez‿ðe‿o.ˈli.βa]
[de la pas el aɾ.ˈkaŋ.xel di.ˈβi.no |]
[k(e)‿en el ˈsje.lo tu‿e.ˈteɾ.no‿ðes.ˈti.no]
[poɾ el ˈde.ðo‿ðe‿ðjos s(e)‿es.kɾi.ˈβjo ‖]
[mas si‿o.ˈsa.ɾe‿un eks.ˈtɾa.ɲo‿e.ne.ˈmi.ɣo]
[pɾo.fa.ˈnaɾ kon su ˈplan.ta tu ˈswe.lo |]
[ˈpjen.sa‿o ˈpa.tɾja ke.ˈɾi.ða k(e)‿el ˈsje.lo]
𝄆 [un sol.ˈda.ðo‿eŋ‿ˈka.ða ˈi.xo te‿ðjo ‖] 𝄇

[ˈko.ɾo]

[ˈge.ra‿ˈɣe.ra sin ˈtɾeɣ.w(a)‿al ke‿in.ˈten.te]
[de la ˈpa.tɾja man.ˈt͡ʃaɾ loz‿βla.ˈso.nes |]
[ˈge.ra‿ˈɣe.ra los ˈpa.tɾjos pen.ˈdo.nes]
[en las o.laz‿ðe ˈsaŋ.gɾ(e)‿em.pa.ˈpað ‖]
[ˈge.ra‿ˈɣe.ra‿en el ˈmon.t(e)‿en el‿βa.ʝe]
[los ka.ˈɲo.nes o.ˈri.so.nos ˈtɾwe.nen |]
[i los ˈe.kos so.ˈno.ɾoz‿re.ˈswe.nen]
𝄆 [kon laz‿ˈβo.sez‿ðe‿un.ˈjon li.βeɾ.ˈtað ‖] 𝄇

[ˈko.ɾo]

[ˈan.tes ˈpa.tɾja ke‿in.ˈeɾ.mes tus ˈi.xos]
[ˈba.xo‿el ˈɟʝu.ɣo su ˈkwe.ʝo‿ðo.ˈβle.ɣen |]
[tus kam.ˈpi.ɲas kon ˈsaŋ.gɾe se ˈrje.ɣen]
[ˈso.βɾe ˈsaŋ.gɾe s(e)‿es.ˈtam.pe su pje ‖]
[i tus ˈtem.plos pa.ˈla.sjos i ˈto.res]
[se‿ðe.ˈrum.ben kon ˈo.ri.ðo(‿)es.ˈtɾwen.do |]
[i suz‿ˈrwi.nas eɣ.ˈsis.tan di.ˈsjen.do]
𝄆 [de mil ˈe.ɾo.ez‿la ˈpa.tɾj(a)‿a.ˈki fwe ‖] 𝄇

[ˈko.ɾo]

[ˈpa.tɾja ˈpa.tɾja tus ˈi.xos te ˈxu.ɾan]
[ek.sa.ˈlaɾ en tus ˈa.ɾas su‿a.ˈljen.to |]
[si‿el kla.ˈɾin kon su‿ˈβe.li.ko‿a.ˈsen.to]
[los kom.ˈbo.k(a)‿a li.ˈðjaɾ kon ba.ˈloɾ ‖]
[ˈpa.ɾa ti laz‿ɣiɾ.ˈnal.daz‿ðe‿o.ˈli.βa]
[un re.ˈkweɾ.ðo ˈpa.ɾa(‿)ˈe.ʝoz‿ðe‿ˈɣlo.ɾja |]
[un lau.ˈɾel ˈpa.ɾa ti‿ðe‿βik.ˈto.ɾja]
𝄆 [un se.ˈpul.kɾo ˈpa.ɾa ˈe.ʝoz‿ðe‿o.ˈnoɾ ‖] 𝄇

[ˈko.ɾo]

English translation

Chorus:
Mexicans, at the cry of war,
assemble the steel and the bridle,
𝄆 and may the Earth tremble to its core
to the resounding roar of the cannon. 𝄇

Encircle, O Fatherland!, thy temples with olives
peace by the divine archangel,
for in heaven thine eternal destiny
by the finger of God it was written.
If, however, a foreign foe would dare
to profane Thy ground with their sole,
think, O beloved Fatherland!, that Heaven
𝄆 hath given a soldier in every son. 𝄇

Chorus

War, war! with no mercy to any who shall try
to tarnish the coats of arms of the Fatherland!
War, war! The national banners
Shall be drenched in the waves of blood.
War, war! On the mountain, in the valley,
The cannons thunder in horrid unison
and the sonorous echoes resound
𝄆 with bellows of Union! Liberty! 𝄇

Chorus

O Fatherland, if however thy children, defenseless
With their necks bent beneath the yoke,
May thy fields be watered with blood,
May their footsteps be printed with blood.
And thy temples, palaces and towers
Shall collapse with horrid clamor,
And thy ruins continue on, whispering:
𝄆 Of one thousand heroes, the Fatherland once was. 𝄇

Chorus

Fatherland! Fatherland! Thy children assure
to breathe until their last for thy sake,
if the bugle with its bellicose accent
calleth them together to battle with courage.
For thee, the olive wreaths!
For them, a reminder of glory!
For thee, a laurel of victory!
𝄆 For them, a tomb of honor! 𝄇

Chorus

=== Original lyrics ===
The following is the original and complete version of the anthem as it became known in 1853.

Spanish original

Coro:
Mexicanos, al grito de guerra
El acero aprestad y el bridón,
𝄆 Y retiemble en sus centros la tierra
Al sonoro rugir del cañón. 𝄇

Ciña ¡Oh Patria! tus sienes de oliva
de la paz el arcángel divino,
que en el cielo tu eterno destino
por el dedo de Dios se escribió.
Mas si osare un extraño enemigo
profanar con su planta tu suelo,
piensa ¡oh Patria querida! que el cielo
𝄆 un soldado en cada hijo te dio. 𝄇

Coro

En sangrientos combates los viste
por tu amor palpitando sus senos,
arrostrar la metralla serenos,
y la muerte o la gloria buscar.
Si el recuerdo de antiguas hazañas
de tus hijos inflama la mente,
los laureles del triunfo, tu frente,
𝄆 volverán inmortales a ornar. 𝄇

Coro

Como al golpe del rayo la encina,
se derrumba hasta el hondo torrente
la discordia vencida, impotente,
a los pies del arcángel cayó.
Ya no más, de tus hijos la sangre,
se derrame en contienda de hermanos;
sólo encuentre el acero en sus manos
𝄆 quien tu nombre sagrado insultó. 𝄇

Coro

Del guerrero inmortal de Zempoala
te defiende la espada terrible,
y sostiene su brazo invencible
tu sagrado pendón tricolor.
Él será del feliz mexicano
en la paz y en la guerra el caudillo.
porque él supo sus armas de brillo
𝄆 circundar en los campos de honor. 𝄇

Coro

¡Guerra, guerra sin tregua al que intente
de la patria manchar los blasones!
¡Guerra, guerra! los patrios pendones
en las olas de sangre empapad.
¡Guerra, guerra! en el monte, en el valle,
los cañones horrísonos truenen,
y los ecos sonoros resuenen
𝄆 con las voces de ¡Unión! ¡Libertad! 𝄇

Coro

Antes, Patria, que inermes tus hijos
bajo el yugo su cuello dobleguen,
tus campiñas con sangre se rieguen,
sobre sangre se estampe su pie.
Y tus templos, palacios y torres
se derrumben con hórrido estruendo,
y sus ruinas existan diciendo:
𝄆 de mil héroes la patria aquí fue. 𝄇

Coro

Si a la lid contra hueste enemiga
nos convoca la trompa guerrera,
de Iturbide la sacra bandera
¡Mexicanos! valientes seguid.
Y a los fieros (Note: Sometimes written fieles ("faithful").) bridones les sirvan
las vencidas enseñas de alfombra;
los laureles del triunfo den sombra
𝄆 a la frente del bravo adalid. 𝄇

Coro

Vuelva altivo a los patrios hogares
el guerrero a cantar su victoria,
ostentando las palmas de gloria
que supiera en la lid conquistar.
Tornaránse sus lauros sangrientos
en guirnaldas de mirtos y rosas,
que el amor de las hijas y esposas
𝄆 también sabe a los bravos premiar. 𝄇

Coro

Y el que al golpe de ardiente metralla,
de la Patria en las aras sucumba,
obtendrá en recompensa una tumba
donde brille, de gloria, la luz.
Y, de Iguala, la enseña querida
a su espada sangrienta enlazada,
de laurel inmortal coronada,
𝄆 formará de su fosa la cruz. 𝄇 (Note: Sometimes written formará de su fosa una cruz ("will form a cross from his grave").)

Coro

¡Patria! ¡Patria! tus hijos te juran
Exhalar en tus aras su aliento,
Si el clarín con su bélico acento
los convoca a lidiar con valor.
¡Para ti las guirnaldas de oliva!
¡Un recuerdo para ellos de gloria!
¡Un laurel para ti de victoria!
𝄆 ¡Un sepulcro para ellos de honor! 𝄇

Coro

English translation

Chorus:
Mexicans, at the cry of war,
assemble the steel and the bridle,
𝄆 and may the Earth tremble to its core
to the resounding roar of the cannon. 𝄇

Encircle, O Fatherland!, thy temples with olives
the divine archangel of Peace,
for in heaven thine eternal destiny
was written by the finger of God.
If, however, a foreign foe would dare
to profane Thy ground with their sole,
think, O beloved Fatherland!, that Heaven
𝄆 hath given a soldier in every son. 𝄇

Chorus

In bloody battles thou sawest them,
their chests palpitating for thy love,
face the shrapnel calm,
and seek death or glory.
If the memory of ancient deeds
of thy children inflameth the mind,
the laurels of triumph, thy forehead
𝄆 they will return immortal to adorn. 𝄇

Chorus

Like the holm oak struck by lightning,
to the deep torrent collapseth
discord, defeated, impotent,
it fell to the feet of the archangel.
No more, the blood of thy children,
spilleth in fight of brothers;
just find the steel in his hands
𝄆 whoever insulted thy sacred name. 𝄇

Chorus

Of the immortal warrior of Zempoala
the terrible sword defendeth thee,
and its invincible arm upholdeth
thy sacred tricolor banner.
He will be, of the happy Mexican,
the caudillo in peace and in war.
because he knew how, his guns of brilliance,
𝄆 to surround in the fields of honor. 𝄇

Chorus

War, war! with no mercy to any who shall try
to tarnish the coats of arms of the Fatherland!
War, war! The national banners
Shall be drenched in the waves of blood.
War, war! On the mountain, in the valley,
The cannons thunder in horrid unison
and the sonorous echoes resound
𝄆 with bellows of Union! Liberty! 𝄇

Chorus

O Fatherland, if however thy children, defenseless
With their necks bent beneath the yoke,
May thy fields be watered with blood,
May their footsteps be printed with blood.
And thy temples, palaces and towers
Shall collapse with horrid clamor,
And thy ruins continue on, whispering:
𝄆 Of one thousand heroes, the Fatherland once was. 𝄇

Chorus

If to the fight against enemy host,
the war horn summoneth us,
the sacred flag of Iturbide,
Mexicans! brave, keep going.
And to the fierce bridoons, let serve them
the defeated ensigns as a carpet;
the laurels of triumph give shade
𝄆 to the forehead of the brave commander. 𝄇

Chorus

To the patriotic homes returneth proud
the warrior to sing his victory,
showing off the palms of glory
that he knew how to conquer in the fight.
Their bloody laurels will turn
into garlands of myrtles and roses,
since the love of daughters and wives
𝄆 also knoweth how to reward the brave. 𝄇

Chorus

And he who, to the blow of burning shrapnel,
succumbeth in the altars of the fatherland,
will obtain in reward a tomb
where the light of glory shineth.
And, of Iguala, the dear ensign
linked to his bloody sword,
crowned with an immortal laurel,
𝄆 will form the cross from his grave. 𝄇

Chorus

Fatherland! Fatherland! Thy children assure
to breathe until their last for thy sake,
if the bugle with its bellicose accent
calleth them together to battle with courage.
For thee, the olive wreaths!
For them, a reminder of glory!
For thee, a laurel of victory!
𝄆 For them, a tomb of honor! 𝄇

Chorus

== Copyright status ==
An urban legend about the copyright status of the anthem states that years after its first performance, Nunó's family sold the musical rights to a German music publishing company named Wagner House. Originally, Nunó was supposed to have turned the music rights over to the state in exchange for a prize from the Mexican government. However, according to the myth, the copyright changed hands again, this time to Nunó himself and two Americans, Harry Henneman and Phil Hill.

In reality, this is not correct. It is true that Nunó, Henneman and Hill did register the music with the company BMI (BMI Work #568879), with the Edward B. Marks Music Company as the listed publisher of the anthem. This might be the version that some have suggested is copyrighted in the United States. However, United States copyright law declares the Mexican anthem to be in the public domain inside the United States, since both the lyrics and music were published before 1923. Furthermore, under Mexican copyright law, Article 155 states that the government holds moral rights, but not property rights, to symbols of the state, such as the national anthem, coat of arms and the national flag.

== National regulations ==
In the second chapter of the Law on the National Arms, Flag, and Anthem (Ley sobre el Escudo, la Bandera y el Himno Nacionales), the national anthem is described in very brief terms. While Articles 2 and 3 discuss in detail the coat of arms and the flag, respectively, Article 4 mentions only that the national anthem will be designated by law. Article 4 also mentions that a copy of the lyrics and the musical notation will be kept at two locations, the General National Archive and at the National Library, located in the National Museum of History (Biblioteca Nacional en el Museo Nacional de Historia).

Chapter 5 of the Law goes into more detail about how to honor, respect and properly perform the national anthem. Article 38 states that the singing, playing, reproduction and circulation of the national anthem are regulated by law and that any interpretation of the anthem must be performed in a "respectful way and in a scope that allows [one] to observe the due solemnity" of the anthem. Article 39 prohibits the anthem from being altered in any fashion, prohibits it from being sung for commercial or promotional purposes, and also disallows the singing or playing of national anthems from other nations, unless you have permission from the Secretary of the Interior (Secretaría de Gobernación) and the diplomatic official from the nation in question. The Secretary of the Interior and the Secretary of Public Education (Secretaría de Educación Pública), in Article 40, must grant permission for all reproductions of the national anthem to be produced, unless the anthem is being played during official ceremonies carried on radio or television. Article 41 states that the national anthem is required to be played at the sign-on or sign-off of radio and television programming; with the advent of 24-hour programming schedules in the 1990s and 2000s, many stations now do so at or as close to midnight and 6 a.m. local time as possible by interpretation of the former traditional times of sign-on and sign-off. The extra requirement for television programming is that photos of the Mexican flag must be displayed at the same time the anthem is playing.

Article 42 states that the anthem may only be used during the following occasions: solemn acts of official, civic, cultural, scholastic or sport character. The anthem can also be played to render honors to the Mexican flag and to the President of Mexico. If the national anthem is being used to honor the national flag or the President, the short version of the anthem is played. Article 43 says that special musical honors may be paid to the President and the flag, but no more than once during the same ceremony. Article 44 says that during solemn occasions, if a choir is singing the anthem, the military bands will keep silent. Article 45 says that those who are watching the national anthem performance must stand at attention (firmes) and remove any headgear. Article 46 states that the national anthem must be taught to children who are attending primary or secondary school; this article was amended in 2005 to add pre-school to the list. The article also states that each school in the National Education System (Sistema Educativo Nacional) will be asked to sing the national anthem each year. Article 47 states that in an official ceremony in which is need to play another anthem, the Mexican anthem will be played first, then the guest state's national anthem. Article 48 states that at embassies and consulates of Mexico, the national anthem is played at ceremonies of a solemn nature that involves the Mexican people. If the anthem is played outside of Mexico, Article 48 requires that the Secretary of External Relations (Secretaría de Relaciones Exteriores), through proper channels, must grant permission for the national anthem to be played and will also ensure that the anthem is not sung for commercial purposes.

== Cultural significance ==
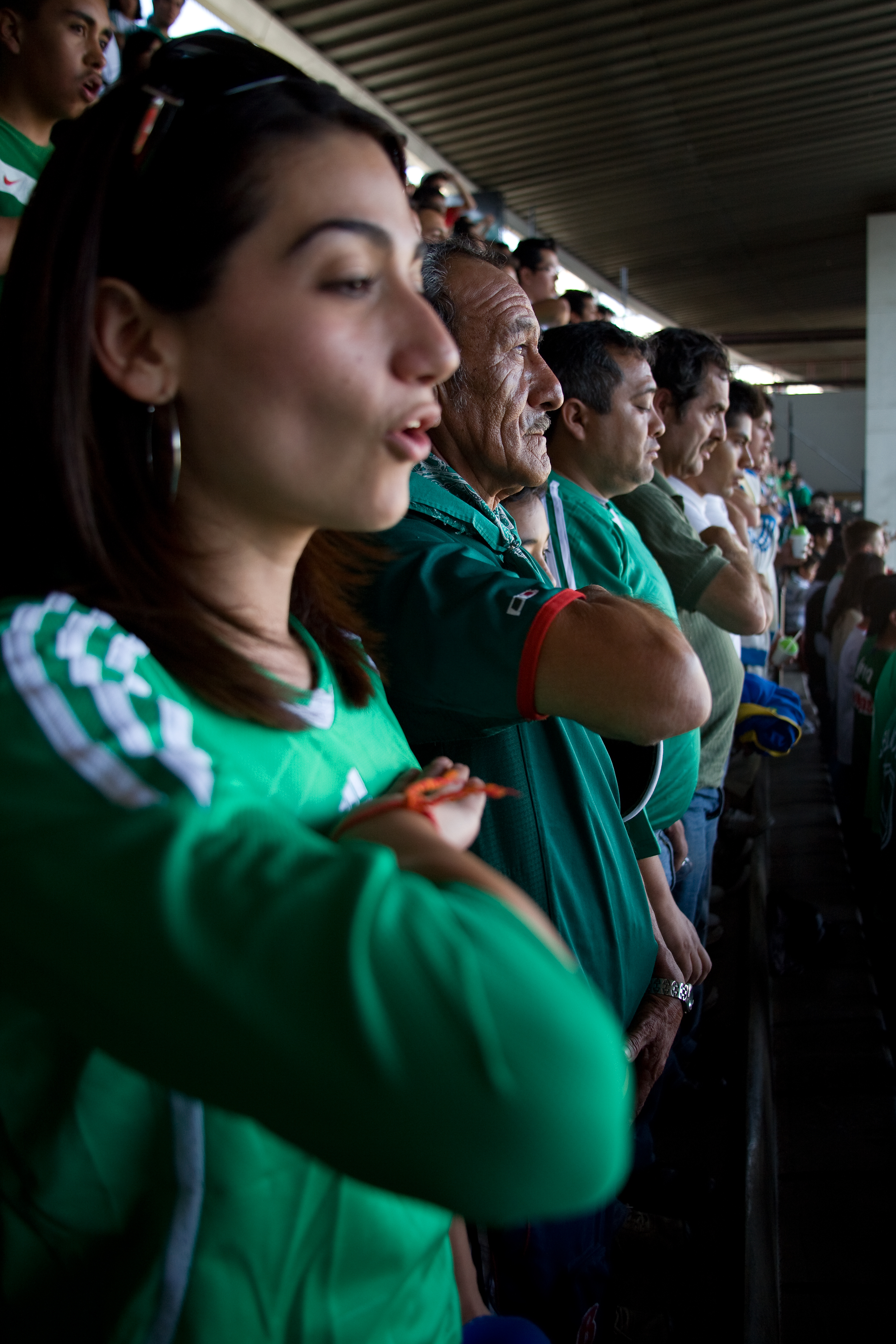
Mexican fans sing the Mexican national anthem before a football match in March 2009.

At the time the Mexican national anthem was written, Mexico was still facing the effects of a bitter defeat in the Mexican–American War at the hands of the United States. The country felt demoralized and also divided, due to the cession of more than half of its territory due to its defeat to the United States. According to historian Javier Garciadiego, who spoke at a 2004 ceremony commemorating the 150th anniversary of the national anthem's adoption, the song disregards divisions and strife and encourages national unity. On that same date, Mexico City and other parts of the country stopped what they were doing and performed a nationwide singing of the national anthem. Individuals from other countries also participated, mostly at diplomatic offices or at locations where a high concentration of Mexican expatriates are found. The national anthem has also been described as one of the symbols of the "Mexican identity".

On the rare occasions when someone performs the national anthem incorrectly, the federal government has been known to impose penalties to maintain the "dignity" of the national symbols. One example is when a performer forgot some of the lyrics at an association football match in Guadalajara, she was fined $400 MXN by the Interior Ministry and released an apology letter to the country through the Interior Ministry. Another infamous case is that of banda musician Julio Preciado, who performed the national anthem at the inauguration of the Caribbean Baseball Series in 2009; El Universal reported that "in a slow tone that has nothing to do with the rhythm of the National Anthem, the singer literally forgot the lyrics of the second stanza and mixed it with others", this earned the fanfare of those who were present at the stadium (and those watching it live on TV), some of the people attending the inauguration started shouting the phrases "¡sáquenlo!, ¡no se lo sabe! ¡fuera, fuera!" (Get him out! He doesn't know it! Out, out!).

In addition, the national anthem is sometimes used as a kind of shibboleth: a tool against people who might not be "true Mexicans" (as opposed to migrants from another Latin American country who pretend that they are from Mexico). The suspected are asked to sing Mexico's national anthem and it is widely expected that only "true Mexicans" will know the lyrics and tune and thus will be able to sing it. In one case, a young man of Afro-Mexican descent was stopped by police and forced to sing the national anthem to prove his nationality. In a separate incident in Japan, police officers asked four people to sing the Mexican national anthem after they were arrested in Tokyo on charges of breaking and entering. However, when they could not sing the song, it was discovered that they were Colombians holding forged Mexican passports. They were later charged with more counts on theft of merchandise and money.

The verse Mas si osare un extraño enemigo ('If, however, a foreign enemy would dare') uses mas and osare, which are archaic poetic forms. Modern prose speakers would use Pero si se atreviera un enemigo extranjero. Thus, the verse has sometimes been misunderstood as Masiosare, un extraño enemigo ('Masiosare, a strange enemy') with Masiosare, an otherwise unused word, as the name of the enemy. "Masiosare" has been used in Mexico as a first name for real and fictional people and as a common name (masiosare or the homophone maciosare) for the anthem itself or for a threat against the country.

== In other languages ==
Though the de facto language of Mexico is Spanish, there are still people who only speak indigenous languages. On December 8, 2005, Article 39 of the national symbols law was adopted to allow for the translation of the lyrics into the native languages. The official translation is performed by the National Institute of Indigenous Languages (Instituto Nacional de Lenguas Indígenas).

Officially, the national anthem has been translated into the following native languages: Chinanteco, Hña Hñu, Mixtec, Maya, Nahuatl and Tenek. Other native groups have translated the anthem into their respective language, but it has not been sanctioned by the Government.

Nahuatl translation

Coro:
Ihcuca yaotl tenochnotzas mexihca,
Ticanacan temicti tepuztli.
Ihuan huelihqui ma tlacohcomoni,
Ihcuac totepuz cueponiz nohuian.

I
Tlazohtlalnan ximoixcuaxochtlali
In pahcayotl nemiliztli cecnitlaca,
Ilhuicapa monemiliz nochipa
Omohcuilo ica imahpiltzin toteo.
Tlaquinequizque in huehca chanehque
Motlalticpac quintlalizque in icxihuan
Tlazohtlalnan xicmati ca mopilhuan
Quin yecanaz toteotzin ipan yaotl.

Coro

V
Yaotl, yaotl in aquin yaotenchuaz
Quin tlilehuaz in tlazohilalan,
Yaotl, yaotl in tlazohtlalnan pantli
Ma paltilo ihtech xalatlyezpozonal.
Yaotl yaotl ipan ixtlahual in cuactla
Ihcuac mocaquiz temictiani tepuztli,
Inanhquilo in tlaototoponal
Tlamach tzatziloz nemaquixtiliz.

Coro

VI
Achto tiquin mopilhuan tazohtlalnan
Cuatlanepantetech iquechpa motemahca
Mamoyeznalocan in tlen ixtlahuahme,
Ihpan eztli icxihuan quintlaliz
Ihuan moteocalhuan, hueicalhuan tzilinal
Mahuetzican ica tlalcocomonal
Ihuan cemihcac quitozqui in tapanzol
Miac mahuiztli oyeni tlazohtlalnan.

Coro

X
Tlazontlalnan mopilhuan mitzilhuia
Ca nochipa mopampa mihmiquizque
Tla technotzaz in yaoltlapitzalli
Ica itenyo huclihqui quemhmanian.
Inic tehuatl iztaque xochime
Inic yehuan ce ilhuica ilnamiquiliz
Cente tlatzaca tlatlaniliz moaxca
Ce mahuiztic tecochtli inic yeh.

Coro

== Musical score ==
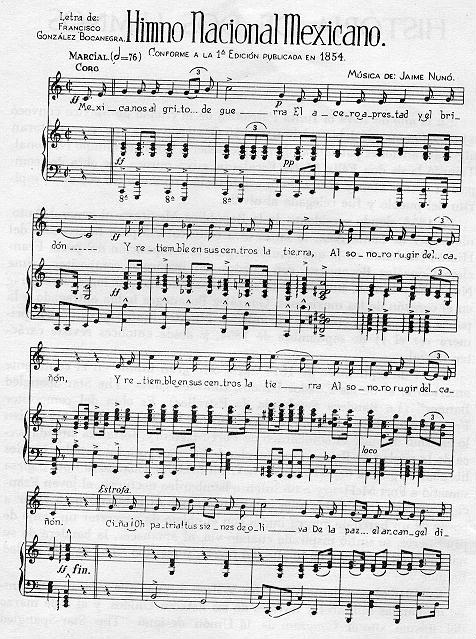
First page of music and lyrics

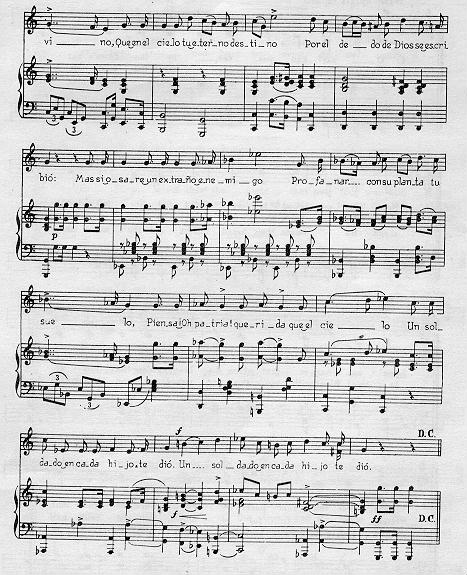
Second page of music and lyrics

== See also ==
- National symbols of Mexico
