= Francisco González Bocanegra =

Mexican poet (1824–1861)

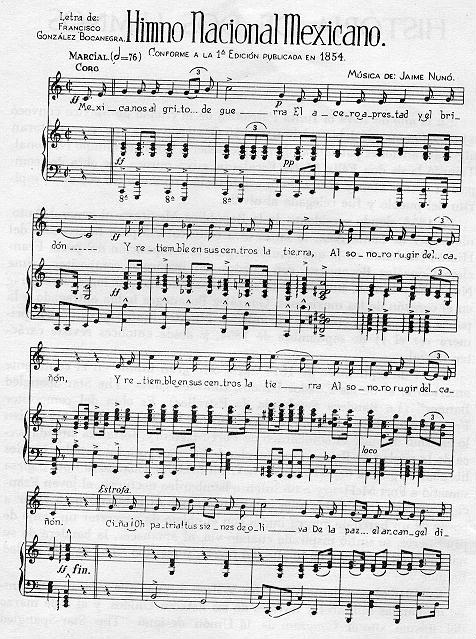

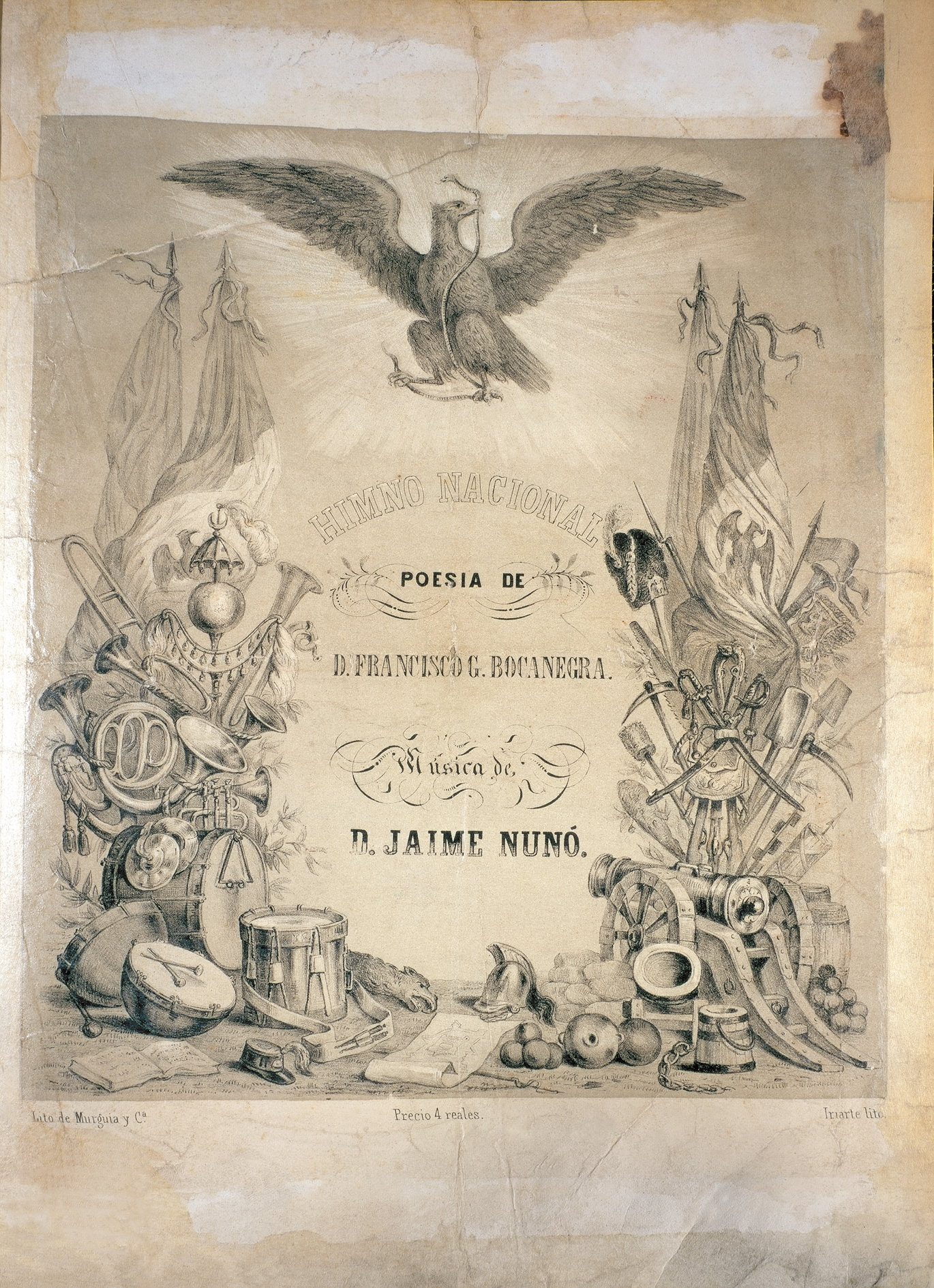

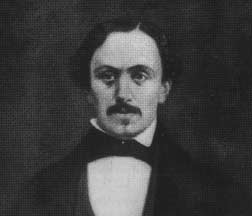
Francisco González Bocanegra

Francisco González Bocanegra (January 8, 1824 – April 11, 1861) was a Mexican poet who wrote the lyrics of the Mexican National Anthem in 1853.

He was born in San Luis Potosí, San Luis Potosí to Spanish soldier José María González Yáñez and Francisca Bocanegra y Villalpando, sister of the Foreign Relations Secretary under President Vicente Guerrero, José María Bocanegra. Despite his father being exempted because of being married to a Mexican, in 1827, his family moved to Spain after a law was enacted expelling all remaining Spanish citizens in the country. They settled in the port of Cádiz until the family returned to San Luis Potosí on December 28, 1836.

He died in 1861 and is interred at the Rotunda of Illustrious Persons.

== Writing of the Mexican national anthem ==
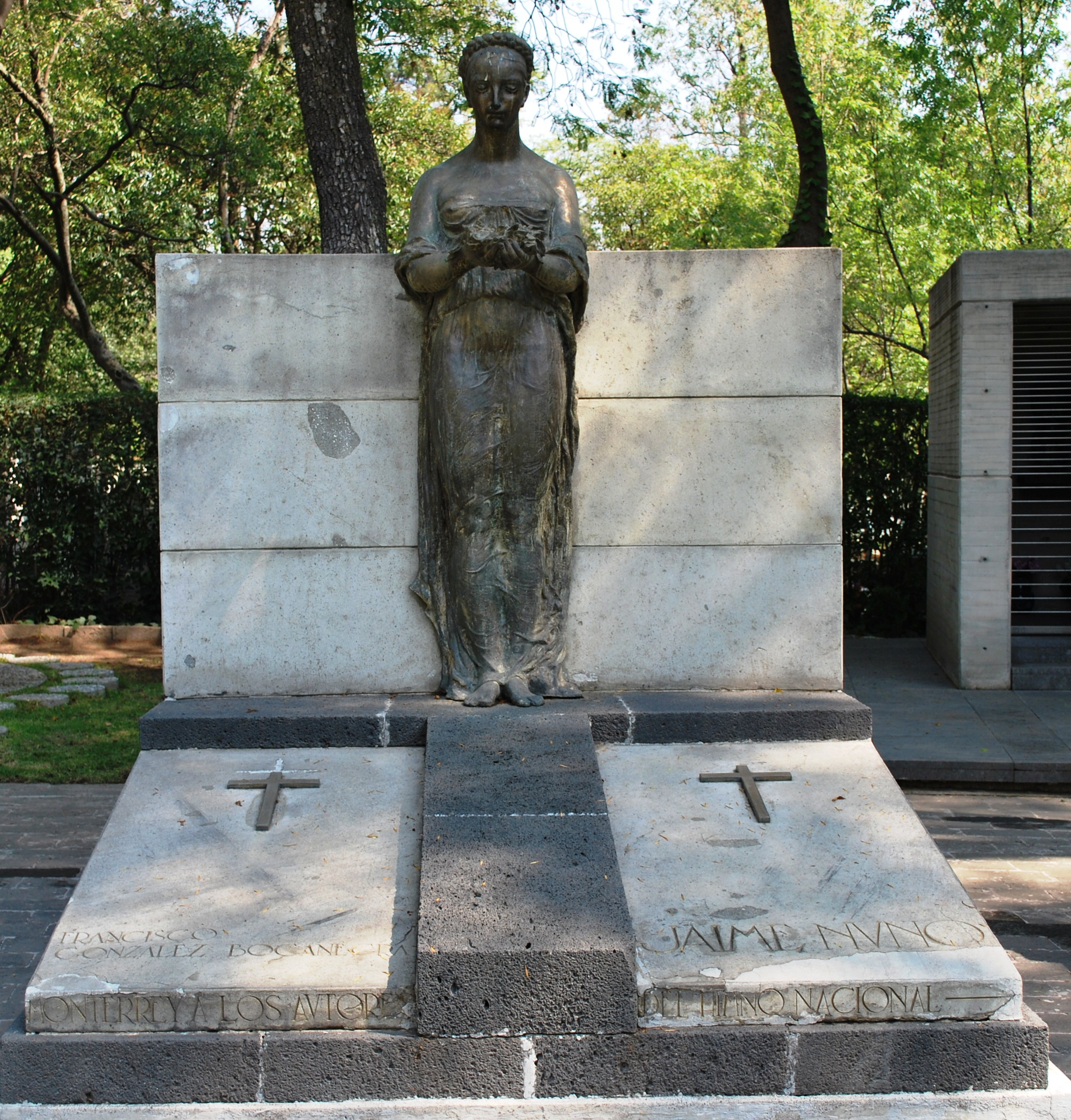
Tomb of Francisco González Bocanegra and Jaime Nunó Roca at the Panteón Civil de Dolores in Mexico City.

On November 12, 1853, President Antonio López de Santa Anna announced a competition to write a national anthem for Mexico. The competition offered a prize for the best poetic composition representing patriotic ideals. González, a talented poet, was not interested in participating in the competition. He argued that writing love poems involved very different skills from the ones required to write a national anthem. His fiancée, Guadalupe González del Pino (or Pili), had undaunted faith in her fiancé's poetic skills and was displeased with his constant refusal to participate in spite of her constant prodding and requests from their friends. Under false pretenses, she lured him to a secluded bedroom in her parents' house, locked him into the room, and refused to let him out until he produced an entry for the competition. Inside the room in which he was temporarily imprisoned were pictures depicting various events in Mexican history which helped to inspire his work. After four hours of fluent (albeit forced) inspiration, Francisco regained his freedom by slipping all ten verses of his creation under the door. After Francisco received approval from his fiancée and her father, he submitted the poem and won the competition by unanimous vote. González was announced the winner in the publication Official Journal of the Federation (DOF) on February 3, 1854.

In 1943, six of González's ten verses were cut from the official full national anthem, leaving his chorus and stanzas 1, 5, 6, and 10.

== See also ==
- Himno Nacional Mexicano
- Jaime Nunó
