= Claudia Florenti =

Italian opera singer

Claudia Florenti was an Italian opera singer with the rank of "magnificent soprano." She, along with a few other Italians including Giovanni Bottesini, were in Mexico to take part in the first performance of the recently adopted Anthem of Mexico at the Santa Anna Theatre in 1854. January
