= Christian Benjamin Uber =

German jurist and composer

Christian Benjamin Uber (20 September 1746 – 1812) was a German jurist, composer and lover of music.

Professionally, he served as a high government official in his native Breslau (modern Wrocław) for much of his career. He studied music with Daniel Gottlob Türk, and was known as a talented amateur musician who regularly organized music evenings at his house. Among the works he composed were a Singspiel, a cantata, an ode, several divertimenti for chamber orchestra, and a sonata and some trios for harpsichord.

Uber was responsible for much development of Breslau's musical life. His son Hermann became a composer and musician; another son, Alexander, made his name as a cello virtuoso. Uber died in Breslau in 1812.
