= Unter =

Unter (German, 'under', 'below' or 'among') may refer to:

- Unter (playing card), the Jack card in German and Swiss-suited playing cards
- Unter Null, stage name of Erica Dunham, an American musician

== See also ==
- Über (disambiguation), the antonym of Unter
- Unter den Linden, historic boulevard in Berlin, Germany
