= Jaime Nunó =

Spanish composer (1824–1908)

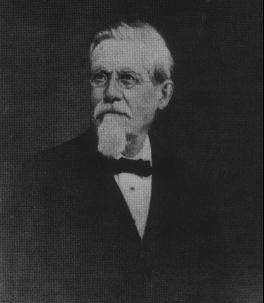
Jaime Nunó

Jaime Nunó Roca (8 September 1824 –18 July 1908) was a Spanish composer from Catalonia who composed the music for the Mexican national anthem.

== Early life and education ==
Nunó was born on 8 September 1824, in Sant Joan de les Abadesses, a town in the province of Girona, in Catalonia, Spain. Both his parents, Francisco Nunó and Magdalena Roca, died before his ninth birthday. After their death, Nunó was raised by his uncle Bernard, a seller of silks in Barcelona, who financed his musical studies in that city. There he demonstrated his skill as a soloist in the city cathedral, as well as a choir director and organist, for which he gained a scholarship to study with the composer Saverio Mercadante in Naples, Italy.

== Career ==
Upon Nunó's return to Barcelona, he was named director of the Queen's Regimental Band in 1851 and travelled with them to Cuba where he met and befriended Antonio López de Santa Anna, the former Mexican president.

When Santa Anna returned to Mexico in 1853 to again resume the office of president, he invited Jaime Nunó to lead the Mexican military bands. His arrival coincided with the national call to compose the Mexican National Anthem. Nunó participated, composing music for the lyrics of Mexican poet Francisco González Bocanegra, and was declared the winner on 12 August 1854. The anthem made its debut at the Santa Anna Theater, on 15 September 1854, and was performed by soprano Claudina Florentini and Lorenzo Salvi, tenor and conducted by Master Vitessiri, with the orchestra of the Great Italian Opera Company.

After the overthrow of President Santa Anna, Nunó emigrated to the U.S. and worked as a conductor and opera director, conducting the concerts of Sigismond Thalberg in New York City.

== Later life and death ==
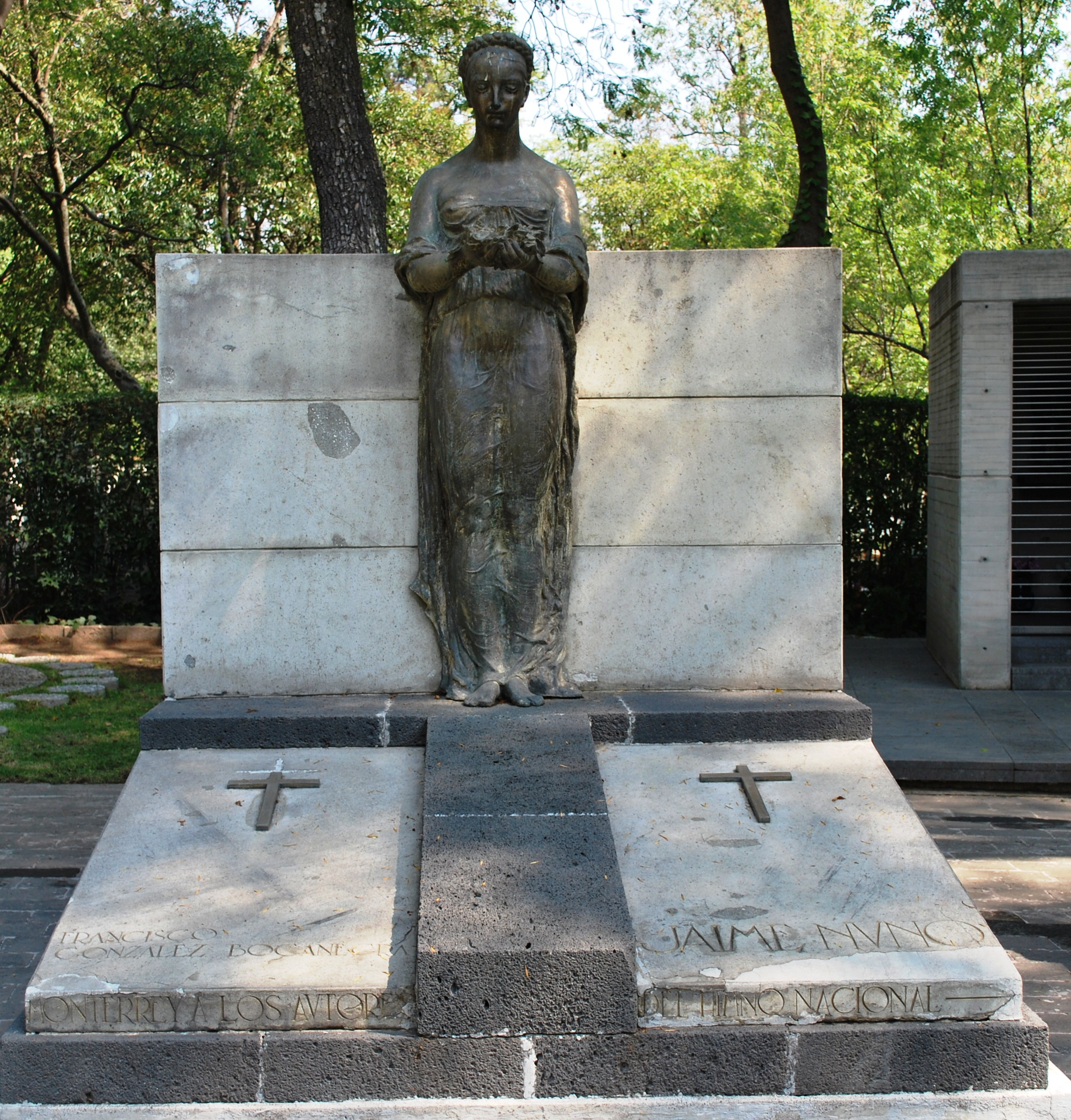
Nunó's gravesite in Mexico City.

After a time in Spain, he returned to the U.S. and settled in Buffalo, New York, where he was found by a Mexican journalist in 1901. When this news reached Mexico, the current president, Porfirio Díaz, invited him to return; he did so and received various honors between 1901 and 1904. He died in New York on 18 July 1908 and was buried in Buffalo. In 1942 the Mexican government ordered that his remains be exhumed and interred in the Rotonda de los Hombres Ilustres (English: Rotunda of Illustrious Men) in Mexico City, where they remain.

== Legacy ==
In 2010, coinciding with the bicentennial of Mexico's independence, the Catalan musicologists Cristian Canton and Raquel Tovar located the only descendant of Jaime Nunó, his great-grandson, living in the U.S. at Pelham, New York. The family granted access to the personal archive of Jaime Nunó, containing about 5,000 unpublished documents (personal letters, scores, official documents, etc.); all this information allowed Canton and Tovar writing the first complete biography of Nunó. This book had a high media coverage and has been described as "an essential title to understand the musical history of Mexico". Also, in the context of the rediscovery of the figure of Jaume Nunó, his native town, Sant Joan de les Abadesses, opened a museum dedicated to the composer in his birth house, known as El Palmàs. Since the recovery of these documents, the unpublished music of Jaime Nunó has been played again, a complete edition of his works was published in 2012 and a recording of them was expected in 2014.
