= Friedrich Christian Hermann Uber =

German composer

Friedrich Christian Hermann Uber (22 April 1781 – 2 March 1822) was a German composer, who also served as the cantor of the Kreuzkirche in Dresden.

Born in Breslau (modern Wrocław), he was the son of lawyer and music-lover Christian Benjamin (born Hermann) Uber; his brother Alexander was a noted cello virtuoso. He studied law in Halle (Saale), before receiving a musical education from Daniel Gottlob Türk. He then received placement as a chamber musician at the court of Prince Louis Ferdinand; beginning in 1807 he served as a first violinist in the orchestra in Braunschweig. From 1808 to 1814 he was Kapellmeister of the opera in Kassel.

Beginning in 1815 he also served as Kapellmeister of the Staatstheater Mainz, and in 1816 he became music director of a group of theaters in Dresden. From 1818 until his death he served as music director of the Kreuzkirche; at the same time he worked as its cantor.

Uber composed French and German operas, intermezzi, cantatas, a Passion, and a violin concerto. Stylistically, he was a Romantic. He died in Dresden in 1822.
