= Daniel Gottlob Türk =

German composer

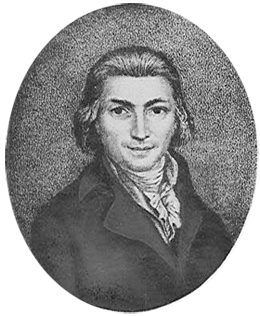

Background information
- Born: August 10, 1750; Claußnitz, Saxony
- Died: August 26, 1813 (aged 63) Halle, Saxony-Anhalt
- Occupation: Composer
- Instrument: Organ

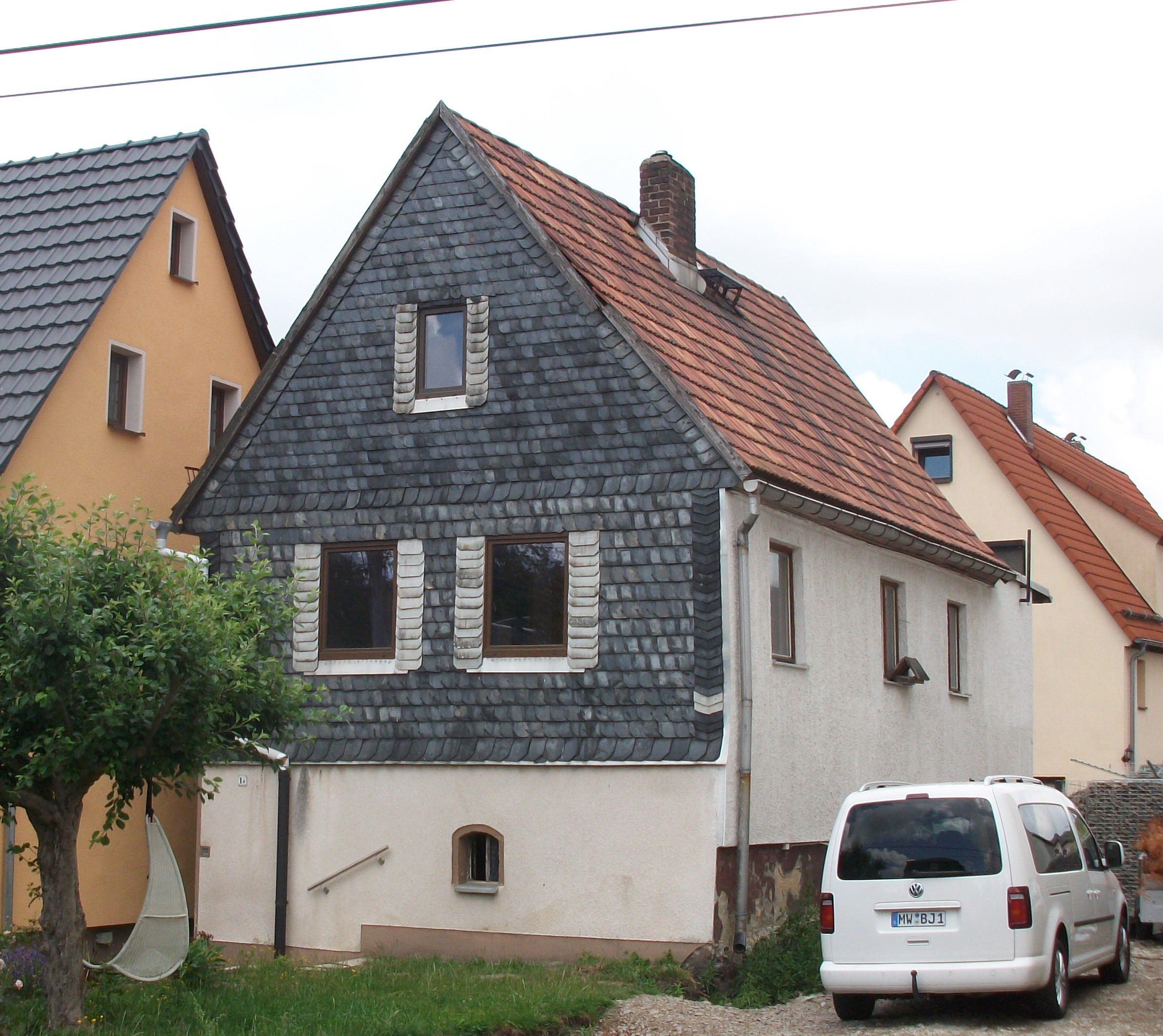
Türk's birth place, Claußnitz

Daniel Gottlob Türk (10 August 1750 – 26 August 1813) was a German composer, organist, and music professor of the Classical period.

== Biography ==
Born in Claußnitz, Saxony, Türk studied organ under his father and later under Johann Adam Hiller. It was Hiller who recommended Türk for his first professional position at Halle University, in Halle, Germany. On 18 April 1779 Halle University granted Türk's request to begin lecturing on music theory, making him the University's "Director of Music." This appointment made Türk the second university music director in Germany. While at Halle, Türk published his treatise On the Role of the Organist in Worship which is still occasionally reprinted.

Several of Türk's dances and minuets for the piano are still popular today. He wrote 18 sonatas. His most notable contribution to the classical music canon is the Klavierschule, a teaching method for the keyboard. He also wrote a cantata, Die Hirten bey der Krippe zu Bethlehem (The Shepherds at the Cradle in Bethlehem) (1782), and some organ pieces and other choral works still in manuscript.

In 1783 he married Johanna Dorothea Rosine Schimmelpfennig, by whom he had two children. He was a member of the Halle Masonic Lodge, "Zu den drei Degen" ("at the sign of the three daggers"), along with his pupil Carl Loewe. In 1813, he fell ill and died of liver disease.

== Teaching ==
Türk was first taught how to play by his father, and later studied with J.S. Bach pupil Gottfried August Homilius in Dresden. Türk was a gifted teacher in his own right, with students such as Hermann Uber, Karl Traugott Zeuner, Johann Friedrich Nauer and Carl Loewe.

== Works ==
Türk's theoretical and didactic works include;

- Von den wichtigsten Pflichten eines Organisten (Leipzig u. Halle 1787, neue Ausgabe von Naue. 1838)
- Klavierschule oder Anweisung zum Klavierspielen für Lehrer und Lernende mit kritischen Anmerkungen. (Leipzig und Halle 1789)
- Kurze Anweisung zum Generalbaßspielen (Leipzig 1791; 5. Aufl. von Naue, 1841)
- Anleitung zu Temperaturberechnungen (Leipzig 1806, 1808 gedruckt)
