= Mazurkas, Op. 7 (Chopin) =

Set of Polish musical compositions by Frederic Chopin

No. 1 in B♭ major

No. 2 in A minor

No. 3 in F minor

No. 4 in A♭ major

No. 5 in C major

The Mazurkas, Op. 7 are a set of five mazurkas by Frédéric Chopin. The mazurkas were mostly written in 1830–1831 (Nos. 2 and 4 exist in earlier versions from 1829 and 1824) and were published in 1832 by Maurice Schlesinger. This is the only set of Chopin's mazurkas that contains five pieces (Jan Ekier's urtext edition places No. 5 as the fifth mazurka in Op. 6); all the composer's other published sets consist of either three or four mazurkas each. It is dedicated to Paul Emile Johns, a German–American pianist from New Orleans who met Chopin in 1832 in Paris.

== Pieces ==
=== No. 1 in B♭ major ===
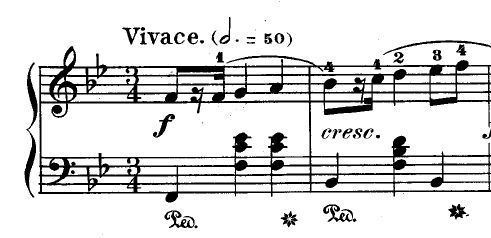
First few bars of Mazurka, Op. 7, No. 1

The first mazurka, set in B♭ major and marked Vivace, is the most well-known mazurka of the set and perhaps, one of Chopin's most popular mazurkas in general. The piece is in rondo form and includes a lively main theme characterized by an upward rise and then downard jumps of ninth intervals. The second theme, in F major, is quite graceful and adds to the elegant character of the piece. After a reprise of the main theme, a third and much more subdued theme is introduced. It is quite tonally ambiguous and its mysterious mood is in total contrast with the rest of the piece. The main theme returns for a final time and the piece ends on a B♭ major chord marked forte. It takes a little under three minutes to perform.

=== No. 2 in A minor ===
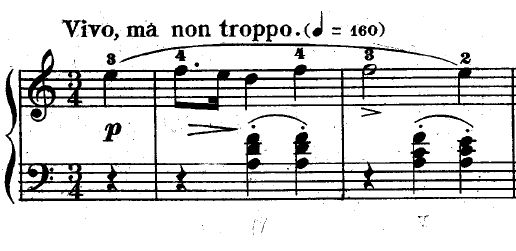
First few bars of Mazurka, Op. 7, No. 2

The second mazurka, in A minor, is an intimate piece. Despite the Vivo, ma non troppo marking, the mazurka has a slow tempo with a very delicate and melancholy main theme. Its gentle sadness is reflective of Chopin's longing for his family and homeland, from which he was exiled around the same time as this piece's composition. This main theme is then followed by a secondary theme which is slightly tonally ambiguous and adds to the mournful quality of the piece. The middle section, in the relative key of A major, contains a slightly more uplifting melody, however it soon gives in again to the tragic main theme and the piece fades away after a final statement of this theme. It is the longest mazurka of the set and lasts for over three minutes.

=== No. 3 in F minor ===
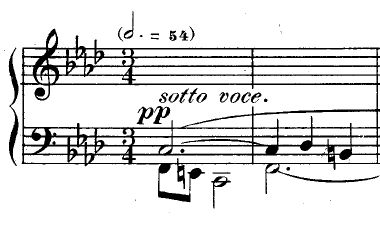
First few bars of Mazurka, Op. 7, No. 3

The third mazurka, in F minor, has a folkish and rustic atmosphere. After a few bars of introduction, the main theme appears, characterized by a colorful Slavic melody and sharp rhythms and accents. The second theme, A♭ major, is quite lively and includes a section with a bass motif. The main theme is reprised, this time in a slightly modified form, and the piece ends quietly, marked pianissimo. A performance of the mazurka lasts for a little under three minutes.

=== No. 4 in A♭ major ===
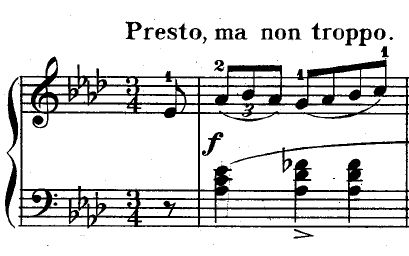
First few bars of Mazurka, Op. 7, No. 4

The fourth mazurka of the set was originally composed in 1824 when Chopin was 14 and is believed to be the first mazurka he ever wrote. It was later revised and published as part of the set. Set in A♭ major and marked Presto, ma non troppo, it features a very playful recurring main theme followed by a more lyrical episode in parallel key of F minor. The piece suddenly slows down near the end and a very short reflective theme in A major appears. However, it soon again transitions to the main theme for a final time and the mazurka ends abruptly. It is a short piece and only takes around a minute to perform.

=== No. 5 in C major ===
The final mazurka, marked Vivo, has only 21 bars and fills barely one page of sheet music. This would make it the shortest piece of the set, and one of the shortest compositions of Chopin, were it not for the ending marked Dal segno senza fine (the only time this instruction was ever used by Chopin). After twelve repeats of the note G in octaves in the left hand, it features a constantly repeating theme of jokeful character. This can be seen as a rare example of humour in Chopin's music. While the piece is in C major, it is mostly centered on G and could conveniently be written in G major.
