= Alexander Uber =

German cello virtuoso, composer, and Kapellmeister

Alexander Uber (1783–1824) was a German cello virtuoso, composer, and Kapellmeister; he was a student of Johannes Jäger. Among his compositions are a cello concerto, a set of variations for cello and orchestra, several instrumental works, and some Lieder. His brother Hermann was also a composer and Kapellmeister; the two were sons of a noted jurist and amateur musician, Christian Benjamin Uber.

Uber was born and died in Breslau.
