= Official Journal of the Federation (Mexico) =

Official gazette of Mexico

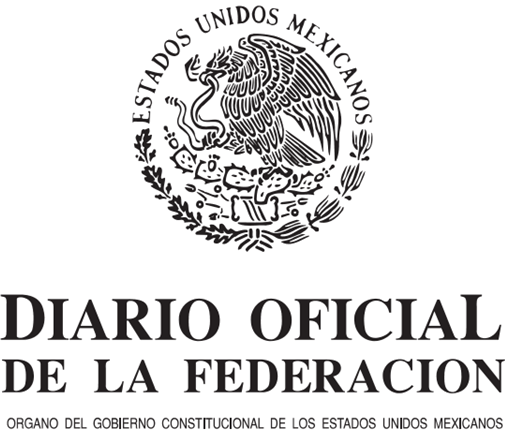

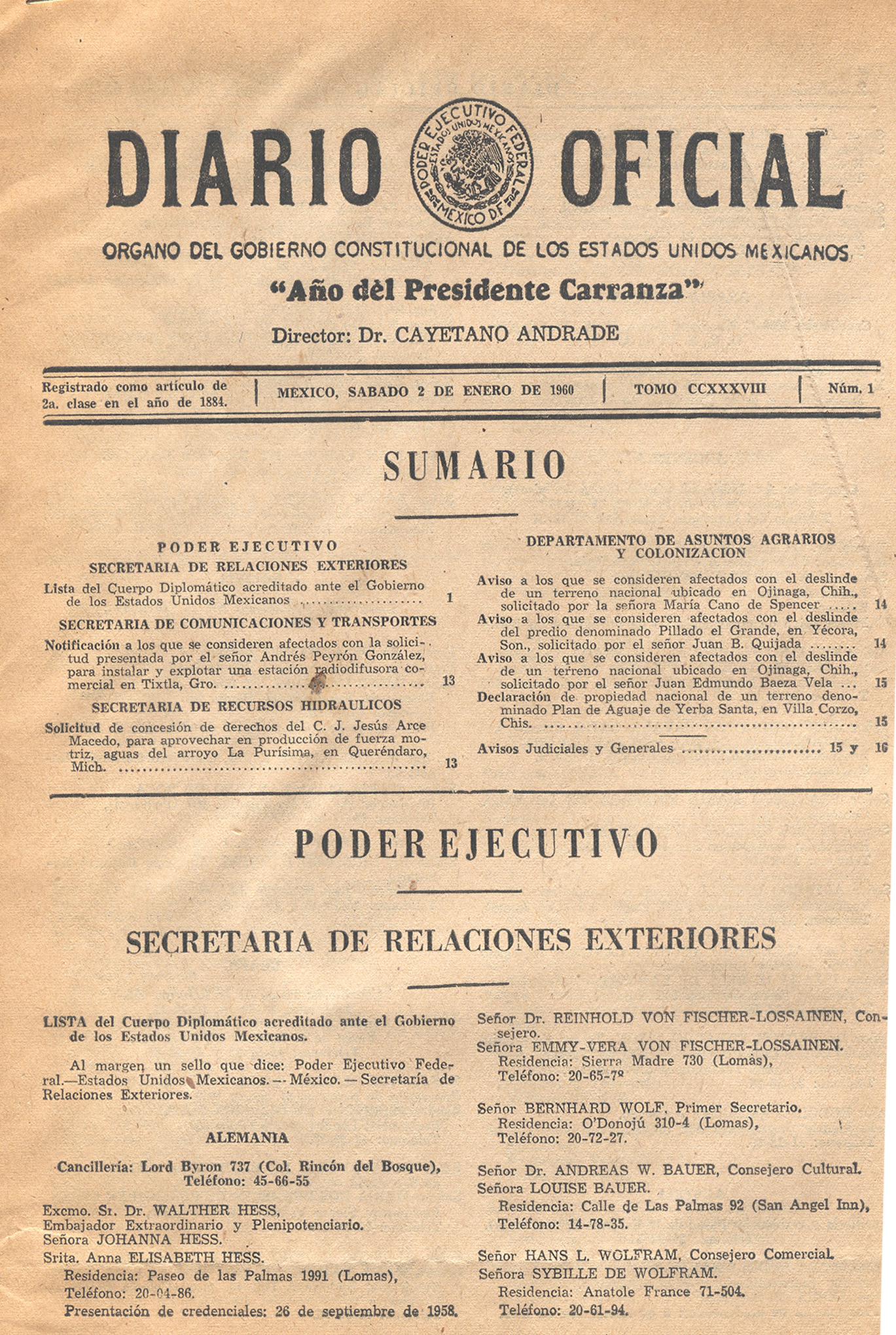
- Diario Oficial de la Federación (January 2, 1960)
- Type: Official daily newspaper of the Government of Mexico
- Publisher: Secretariat of the Interior
- Founded: September 28, 1848; 177 years ago
- Language: Spanish
- Headquarters: 1 Río Amazonas No. 62; Col. Cuauhtémoc; Ciudad de México 06500
- Country: Mexico
- Website: dof.gob.mx

The Diario Oficial de la Federación (DOF; translated variously as the Official Journal of the Federation or as Official Gazette of the Federation), published daily by the government of Mexico, is the main official government publication in Mexico. It was established on September 28, 1848.

Current issues express legally the political, economic and social institutions in Mexico, while the history of those same institutions can be read in older issues.

The Official Journal is similar to other main governmental journals (as the United States Federal Register or the Canada Gazette), but they differ from each other because they respond primarily to their type of government and secondly to their legal system.

In the Official Journal, the main rules and regulations of the three branches of the federal government are published. This journal is the head of the set of the governmental journals in Mexico (every state and the Federal District has an official gazette for its jurisdiction, and also some municipalities).

The importance of reading the Official Journal on a daily basis responds to the mandate that all official government rules and regulations must be published in it, and so only through this publication their compliance can become mandatory. Once a law or regulation is published, ignorance of it is no longer a legal defence.

The Official Journal contains treaties, laws, decrees, sentences, agreements, resolutions, general and judicial warnings, national and international public bids to provide the government with goods and services, among other issues concerning the three Branches of the Federation.

This journal is regulated by the Law of the Official Journal of the Federation and Government Gazettes (DOF, December 24, 1986). The responsibility for its compilation is within the Secretariat of the Interior (Secretary of Government), officially known as Secretaría de Gobernación, or SEGOB.

== See also ==
- Law of Mexico
