= Oaxaca en la historia y en el mito =

Mural by Arturo García Bustos

Oaxaca en la historia y en el mito (English: Oaxaca in history and myth) is a huge mural created by Arturo García Bustos (1926-2017) and located in Oaxaca de Juárez, know in English as Oaxaca City.

García Bustos was "an artist dedicated to the humanistic struggles and liberal ideals that he expressed profoundly in his art." He painted the mural in a stairwell in the Palacio de Gobierno in Oaxaca. In an earlier version of this article, the space where the mural is located was officially known as the Museo del Palacio Universum. But the museum has disappeared. And in 2025 the mural is seldom available for viewing.

A pamphlet distributed to attendees at the inauguration described the mural as a "mapamundi oaxaqueño" or a Oaxacan worldmap. The mural is a visual history of Oaxaca from prehistoric times to modern times, with little detail past the Mexican Revolution. The images selected and not selected in a visual history are key to the final message. Bustos focused on images of the liberal traditions and reform in his interpretation of the history of Oaxaca, largely leaving out those who opposed liberal ideas, such as the church and monarchists and also played important roles in Oaxacan and Mexican history. This article cites academic research and government publications, with the latter being prone to perpetuating what has been called "mithified" history.

In the artist's words: "Cuando pinté la escalera monumental del Palacio de Gobierno de Oaxaca sentí que lo que había que revelar era la historia que contenían esos corredores por los que habían transitado muchos de los creadores de nuestra historia patria." ("When I painted the monumental staircase of the Government Palace of Oaxaca, I felt that what had to be revealed was the history that those corridors contained through which many of the creators of our national history had passed.") Many of the individuals portrayed on the mural did not literally climb the steps and pass through the corridors where the mural now depicts their history, as the artist suggests, The entire prehispanic panel depicts an era long before the building, and Oaxaca were thought of. Also, the Government Palace was often not usable during phases of repair after earthquakes in 1787, 1801,1845,1854 and 1931. But the individuals in the mural did shape the history of Oaxaca and even Mexico. And if the events did not occur in the building, many occurred in the nearby Zocalo, the Cathedral and the surrounding area, called el centro.

The artist also explains: "Somos un pueblo con una historia antigua que ha demostrado su genio labrando piedras para edificar ciudades que quisieron alcanzar las estrellas, espacios reales en armonía con los paisajes, el cosmos y el hombre." ("We are a people with an ancient history that has demonstrated its genius by carving stones to build cities that wanted to reach the stars, real spaces in harmony with the landscapes, the cosmos and man")

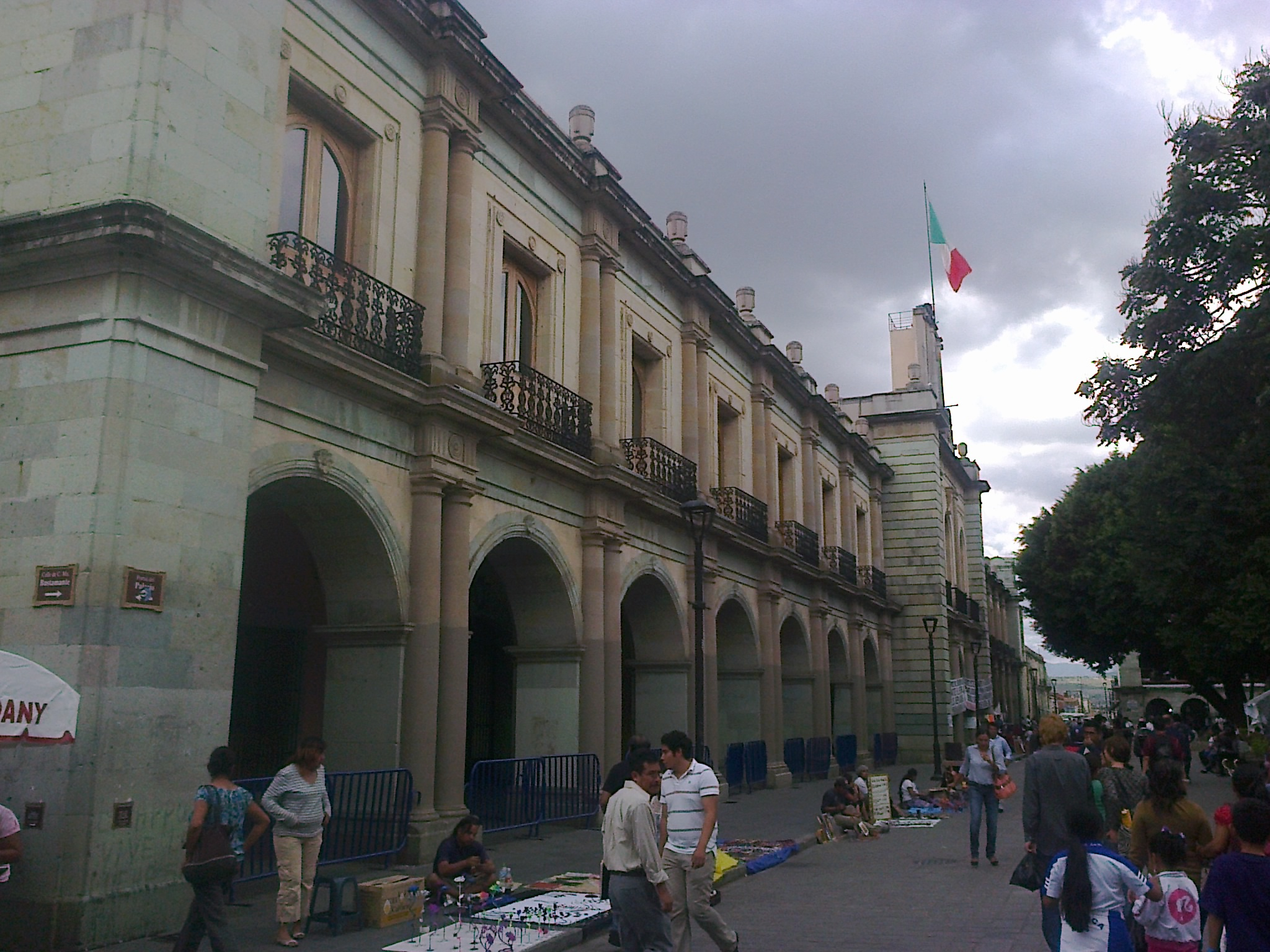
Palacio de Gobierno, Oaxaca, México

A glossy government-sponsored book about the history of Oaxaca published in 2019, includes this summary about the mural: "Si para un visitante es interesante apreciar estos murales, para un oaxaqueño debe ser obligatorio conocer cada una de sus imágenes y sentirse orgulloso de esta tierra mexicana." ("If it is interesting for a visitor to appreciate these murals, for an Oaxacan it must be mandatory to know each of their images and feel proud of this Mexican land."). Unfortunately, under the present regime, visitors are often forbidden from visiting the mural because guards bar access when there are protests in the nearby public square. Also, the guards have orders to refuse entry to viewers when the governor is holding meetings.

The distinguished historian, Francie Chassen-López wrote in 1989, "la historia de Oaxaca es muy poco conocida" ("the history of Oaxaca is very little known"). Understanding what Arturo García Bustos tells us about the history of this region in Oaxaca en la historia y en el mito is a good place to start, to understand some, but not all, aspects of the history of Oaxaca. Presentations in about the mural, in English, have been delivered in the cultural center called the Oaxaca Lending Library. These presentations include a visit to the mural when access is permitted.

== Opposition to Arturo García Bustos painting the mural ==
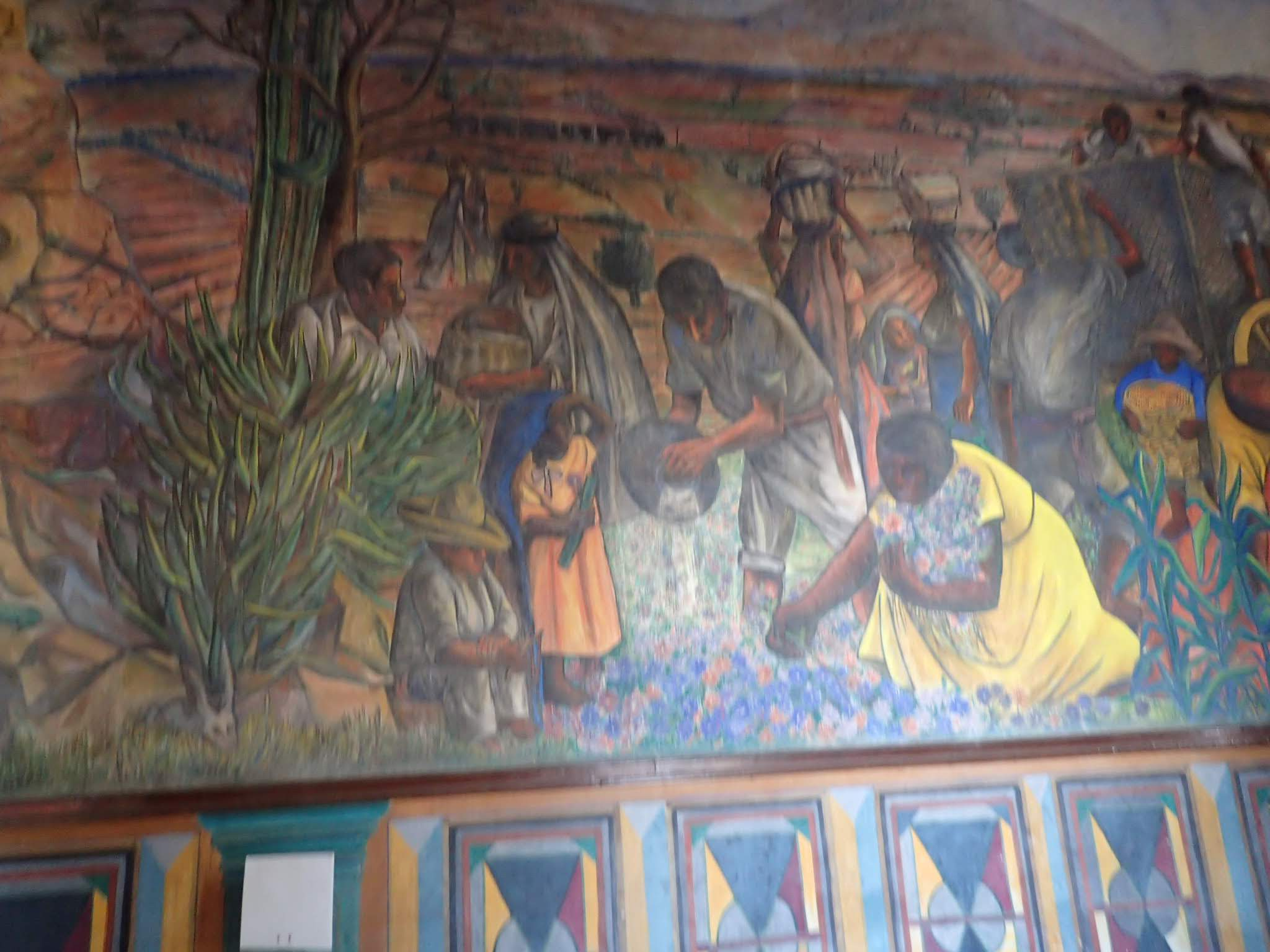
Mural by Rodolfo Morales located in Ocotlán de Morales, Oaxaca.

The contract to paint the mural was granted without competition, by the governor Eliseo Jiménez Ruiz after an initial conversation with the brother of García Bustos. Ruiz and Bustos followed up with a longer conversation and demonstration of a partial mock-up by the artist, hurriedly cobbled together in a local restaurant.

Bustos was not new to Oaxaca. In the 1950s, he had taught art at the Universidad Autónoma Benito Juárez de Oaxaca (UABJO) to Francisco Toledo and other Oaxacan artists. He at that time traveled extensively in the state, until he was released from his teaching for his Marxist views, after he returned to Oaxaca from a trip to Russia in 1958.

García Bustos was not from Oaxaca. Whereas famous Mexican artists Rufino Tamayo, Francisco Toledo and Rodolfo Morales were from Oaxaca City or the State of Oaxaca, although they had not completed any murals in Oaxaca before Garcia Bustos started.

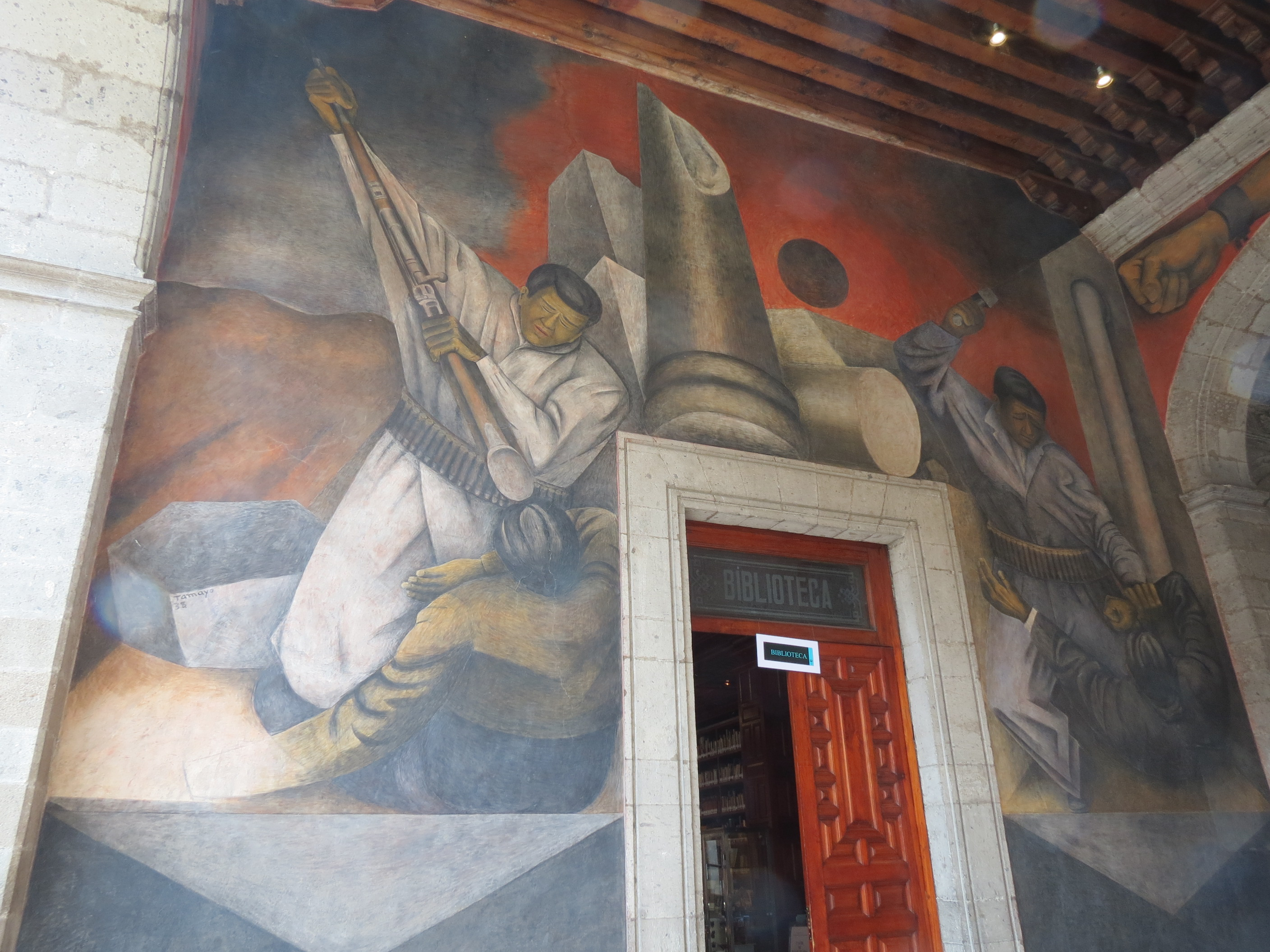
Mural by Rufino Tamayo in the Museo Nacional de las culturas, historic center, Mexico City, Mexico.

After he started, opposition to Bustos painting the mural grew. On 27 May 1978, The Oaxacan artist Rufino Tamayo published a letter to the editor stating that the artistic experience of García Bustos, known better for his engravings, "nada tiene que ver con la pintura y mucho menos con la pintura mural." ("his engravings have nothing to do with painting, much less with mural painting.") However, after additional exchanges, on 5 June 1978, 18 Oaxacans, from different professional and artistic areas wrote a letter to the editor supporting García Bustos.

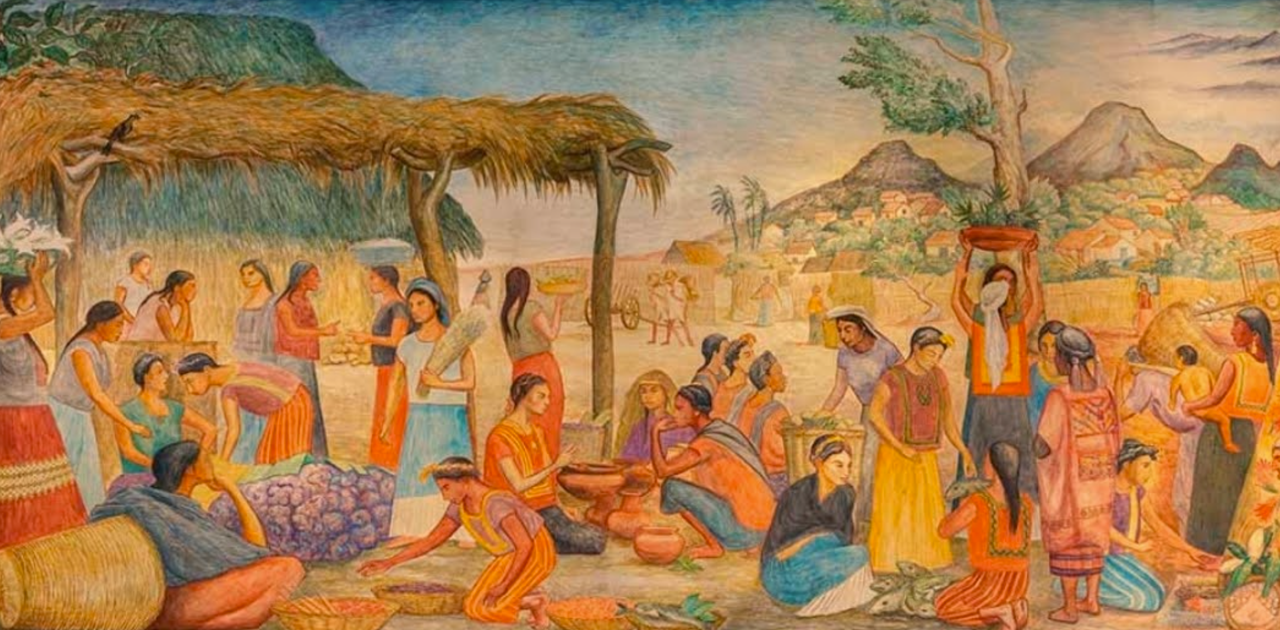
Mural by Arturo Garcia Bustos in the National Museum of Antropologia, Mexico City

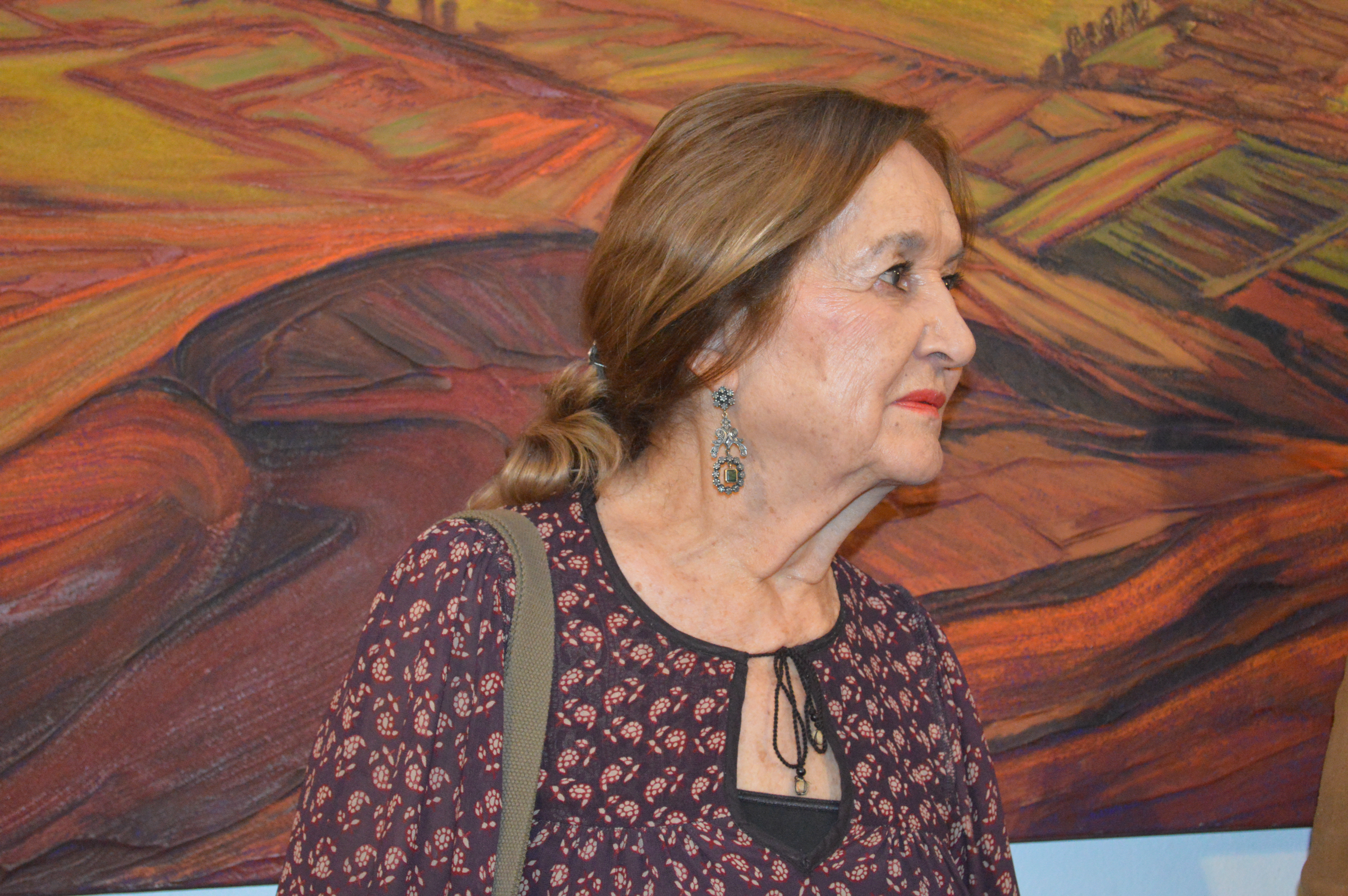
Rina Lazo, 2015

Rufino Tamayo's branding of Garcia Bustos as inexperienced with mural painting was inaccurate. In the 1960s Garcia Bustos painted a large mural about Oaxaca in the National Museum of Antropologia. He painted other murals in Mexico cities. He studied under and painted murals with the famous Mexican muralist Frida Kahlo and his wife Rina Lazo, who helped with the mural, was an assistant to Diego Rivera, the most

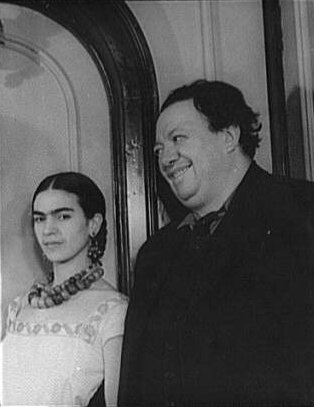
Frida Kahlo Diego Rivera, 1932

famous Mexican muralist. Oaxaxan, Rufino Tamayo and other "modern" artists have criticized the mural in Oaxaca for being excessively literal, with images that replicated various historical figures, as they were depicted in other paintings, perhaps repeating the historical inaccuracies of the originals.

While Garcia Bustos was painting the mural he taught art at UABJO, as he had done some 25 years earlier before being forced out. It appears that by appointing Bustos to UABJO, the cash-starved state of Oaxaca compensated him for painting the mural.

== The roots of Mexican Muralism ==
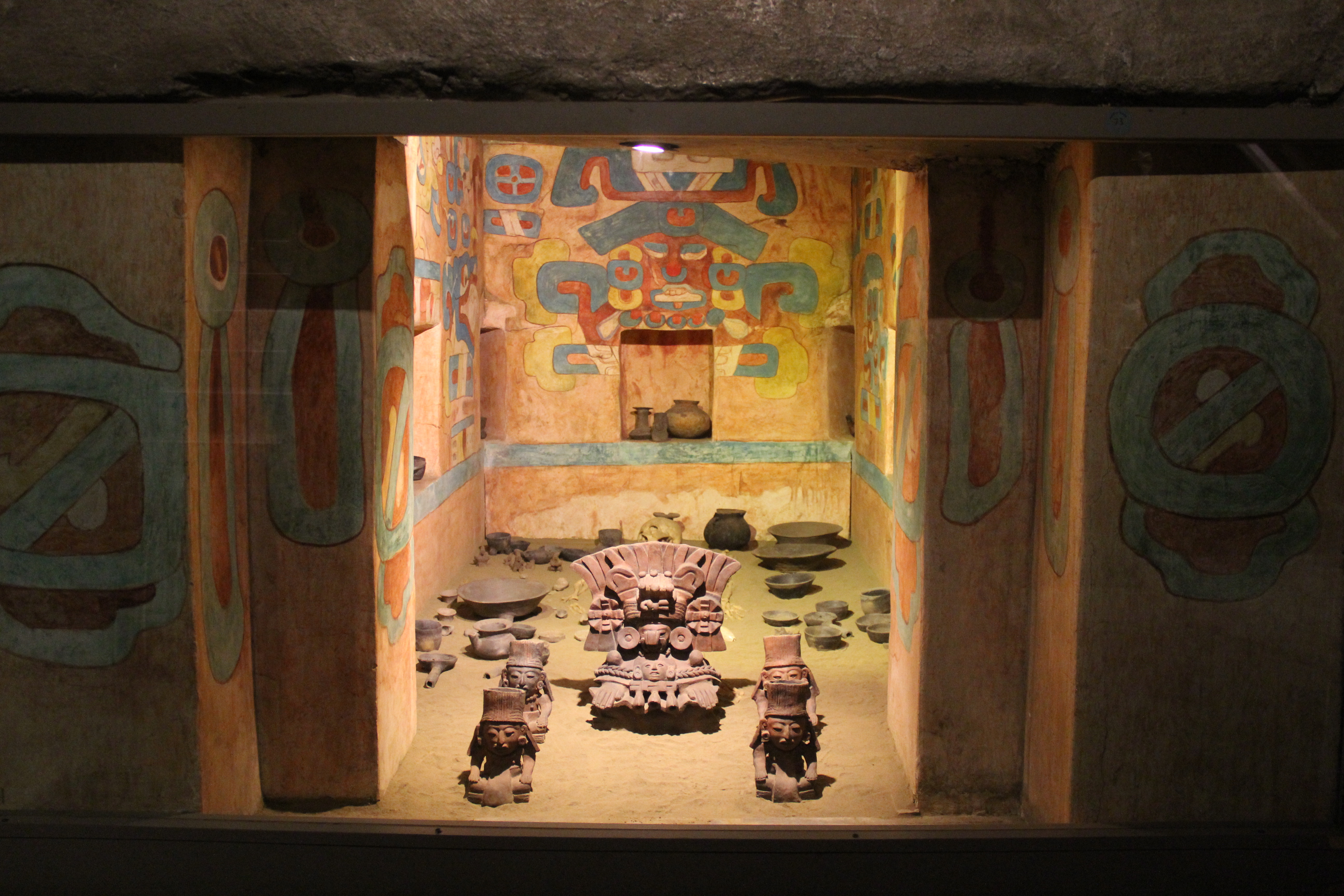
Oaxaca Gallery, INAH, National Museum of Anthropology, Mexico City, Tomb 104

Mexican and Oaxacan muralism has deep roots. The murals on the interior wall of tombs of Monte Albán, for example, are around 1,500 years old, Tomb 104 has been carefully reproduced in the National Museum of Anthropology (Mexico), including the original murals.

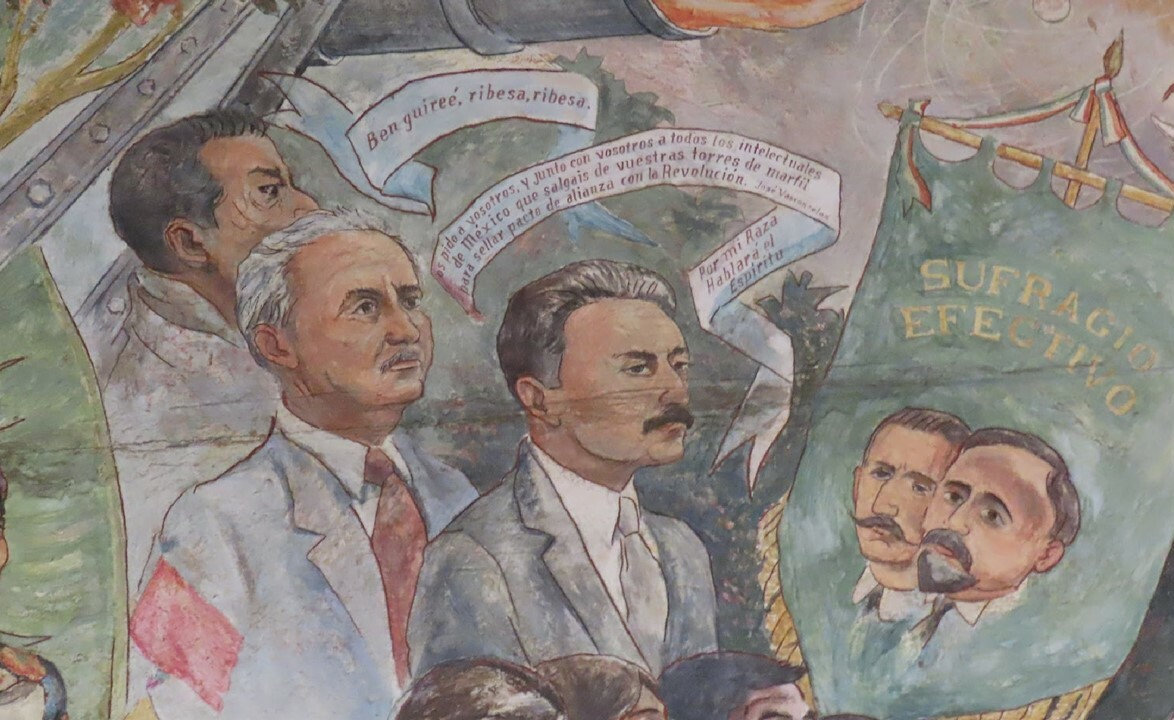
From the mural, José Vasconcelos with a moustache

Modern mexican muralism received a boost after the Mexican Revolution. The man behind the program, José Vasconcelos Calderón (1882–1959) appears on the mural. After the Mexican Revolution ended in 1921, as the Secretary of Education, Vasconcelos obtained a large budget and generated projects to foster nationalism, especially through sponsoring large patriotic murals in public spaces.

Arturo García Bustos, as a child, living in El Centro of Mexico City, observed Diego Rivera painting these patriotic murals. Later Bustos studied mural painting as part of the nationalist art movement with Frida Kahlo in a group called Los Fridos. Bustos collaborated with Kahlo on murals on a daily basis in the mid-1940s.

In short, the mural Oaxaca en la historia y el mito springs from the roots of muralism and nationalism that José Vasconcelos planted some 50 years before García Bustos painted his mural in Oaxaca.

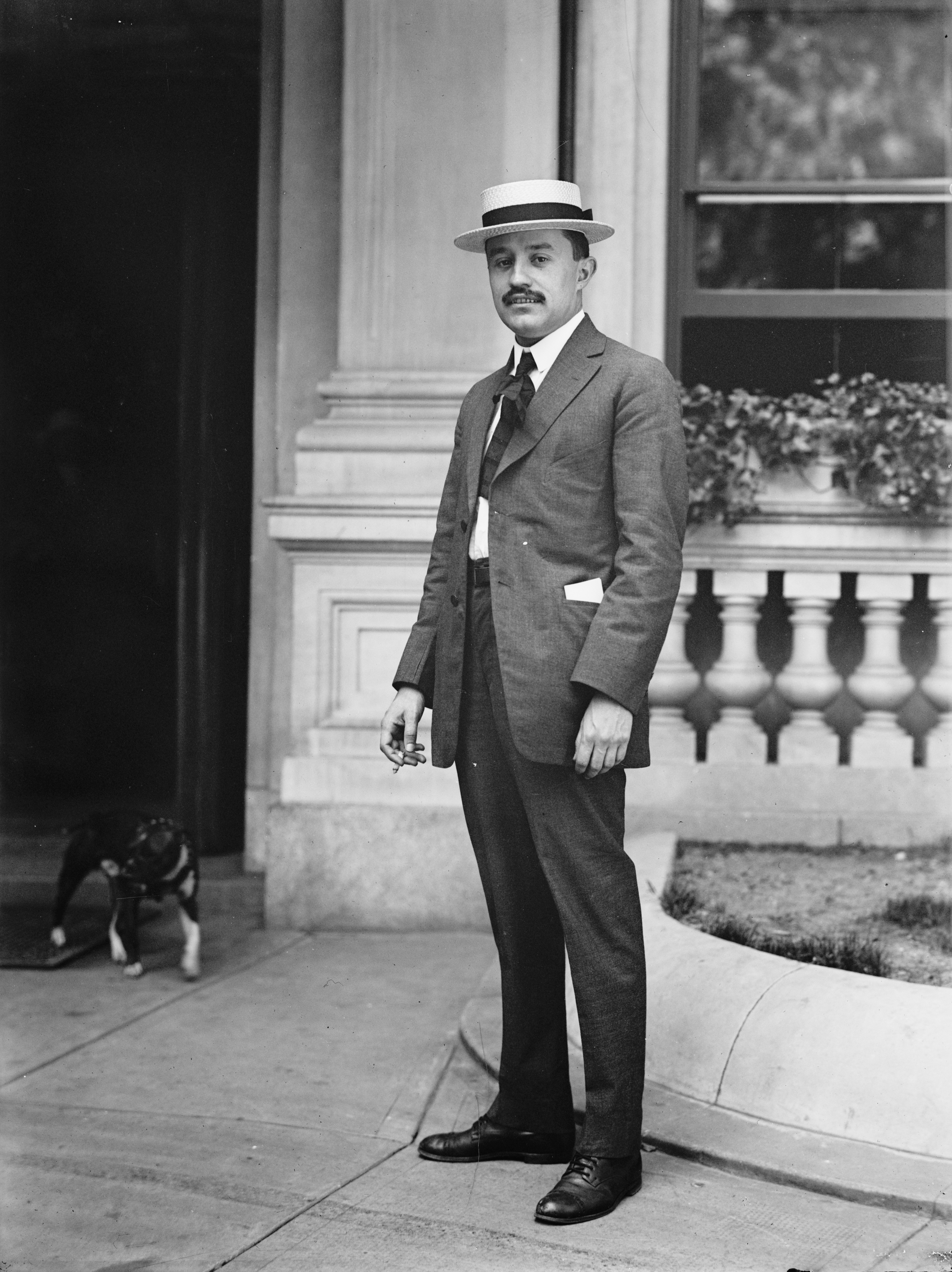
Jose Vasconcelos, Mexican writer, philosopher, politician and supporter of Mexican muralism.

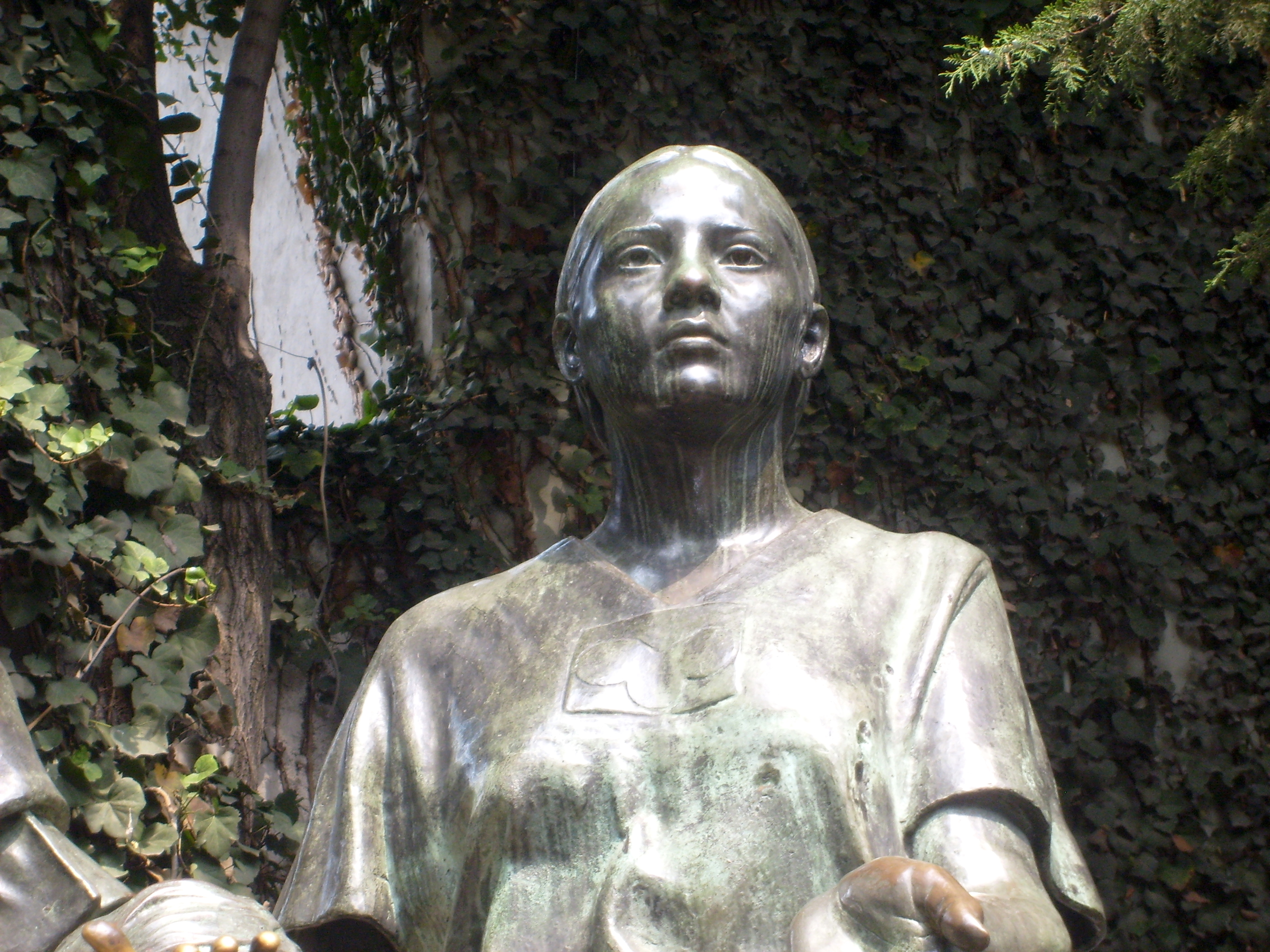
La Malintzin statue

Vasconcelos, a man with deep, sometimes mystical, connections to the past, lived in Coyoacán, a colonial neighbourhood of Mexico City in the home that Hernán Cortés is said to have built for his interpreter-mistress. How we call this woman shows how we view her. At birth she seems to have been called Malintzin or some version of that. It appears that when she became enslaved to Cortés she was renamed Doña Marina. Over the years, she has often been called, La Malinche, which has a connotation that she was a traitor, which she was not.

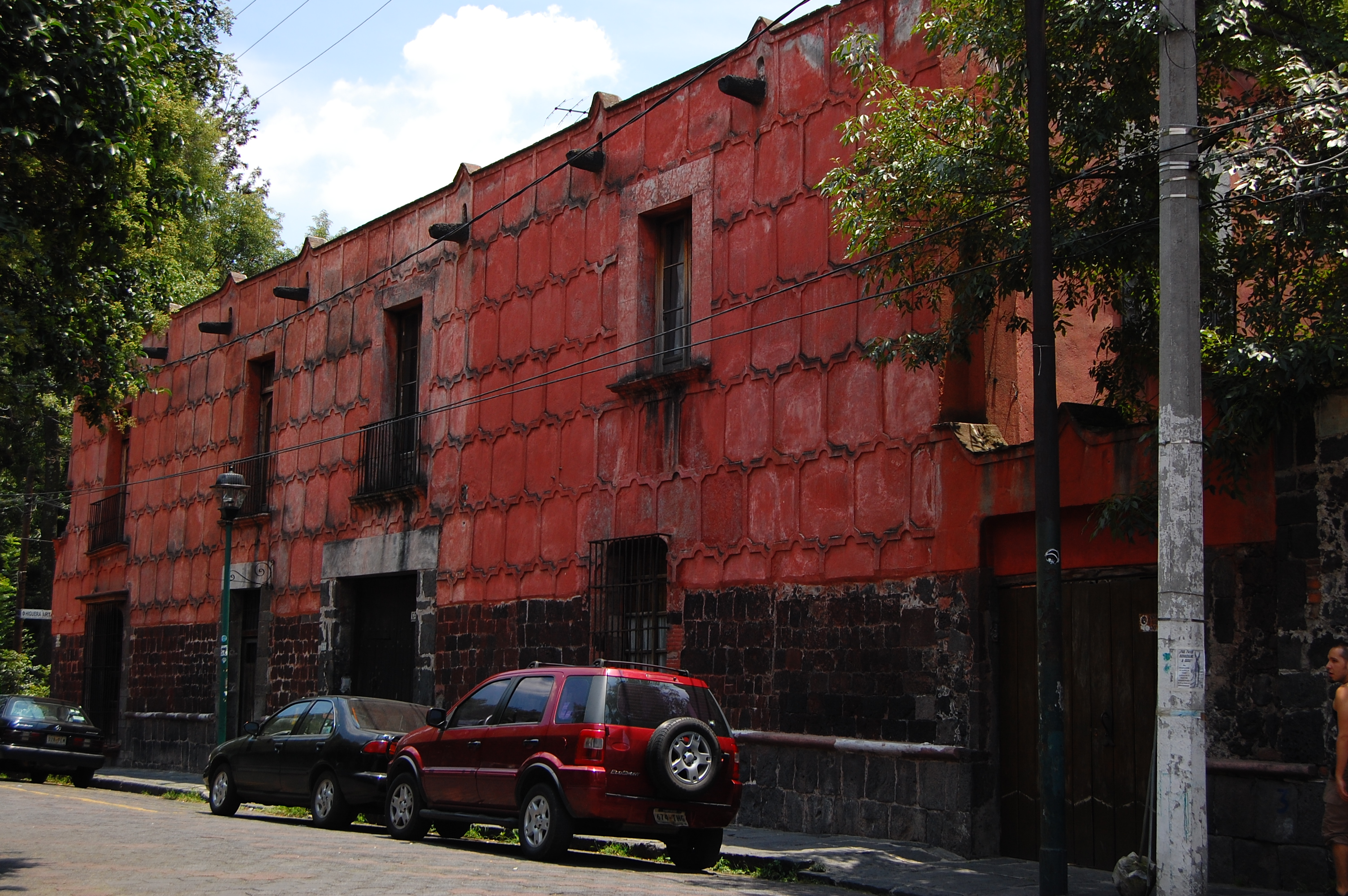
Casa de la Malinche Coyoacán

García Bustos, always the champion of Mexican history and antiquity, purchased the home in the early 1960s and lived there for half a century, painting with his wife, the artist, Rina Lazo. He also maintained a home and studio in San Filipe de Aqua, a suburb of Oaxaca and visited from time to time as his family still does in 2025.

== General Description ==
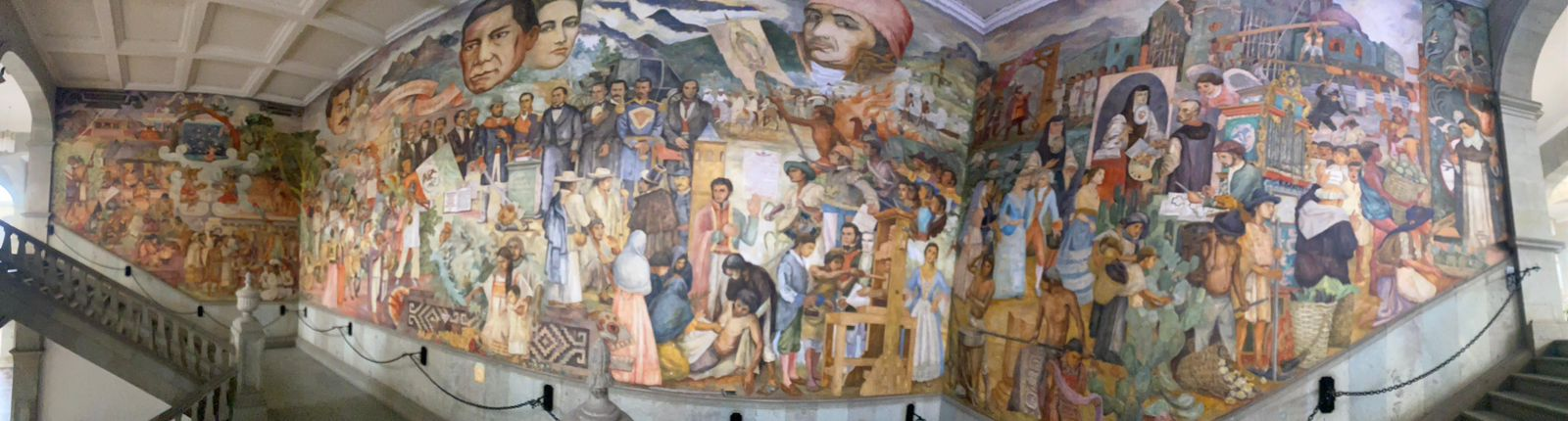
The three panels of the mural in the Palacio de Gobierno

The mural covers 220 m^{2} (2,400 sq ft) spread over three walls. It depicts some 100 life-size images of objects, people and events, making a semi-circle around a large internal stairwell.

The artist used the elaborate, and time-consuming encaustic technique, using heated wax. The rough surface created by the wax covering the painted surface, reflects light and enlivens the mural. The mural tells the stories of Huaxyacac-Antequera-Oaxaca-Oaxaca de Juárez (0axaca City), the names given to Oaxaca City starting in the late 1400. The mural has three panels covering, three eras of Oaxacan history. In chronological order the panels are; Prehispanic, sometimes called the pre-Columbian era, of some 10,000 or maybe 20,000 years ago to 1521, the second era is colonial times when Spain ruled New Spain roughly from 1521 to 1821, and the third panel represents the 100 years of unrest punctuated by the Mexican War of Independence, the Reform War, the Second French Intervention and The Mexican Revolution, roughly from 1810 to 1921 and beyond. This third panel, the largest, lies in the middle.

It is said by some that the bottom layer of each panel pictures everyday life. The middle layer illustrates forces and events shaping the history of Oaxaca. The third, or top layer of the mural, represents the ideals and leaders of Oaxaca through the three eras portrayed.

== Prehispanic Panel ==
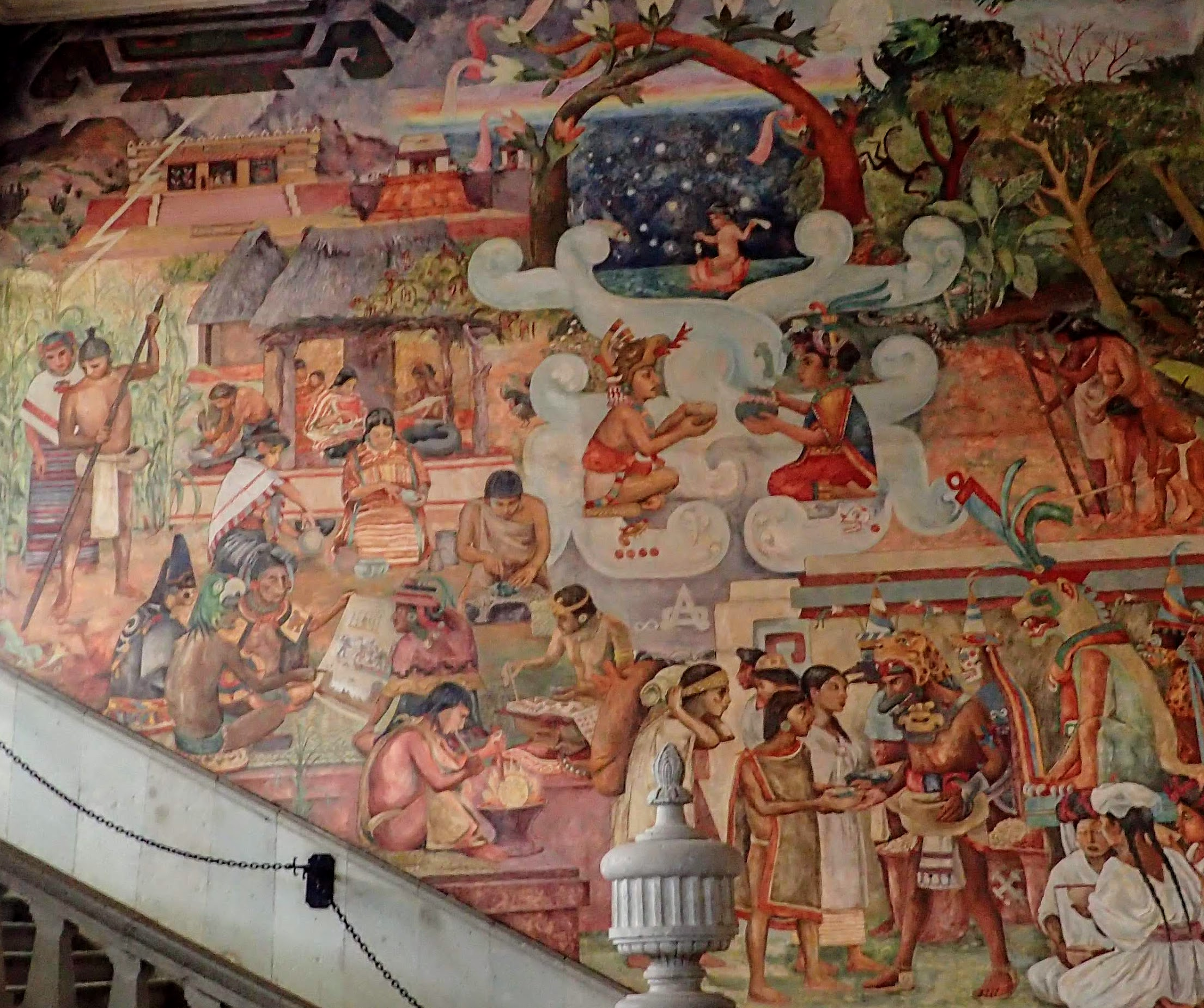
Prehispanic panel

The term prehispanic refers to the period in Mesoamerica before the Spanish arrived. Critics of the use of the term prehispanic, reason as follows:

"La palabra prehispánico tiene una connotación de "aparición" de los pueblos mesoamericanos en la historia a partir de la llegada de Hernán Cortés y de los hispanos que lo acompañaban. Previamente, Mesoamérica era una región habitada por civilizaciones y culturas diversas, muchas de ellas en contacto interétnico.

Google Translate converts the above to:

"The word pre-Hispanic has a connotation of "appearance" of the Mesoamerican peoples in history after the arrival of Hernán Cortés and the Hispanics who accompanied him. Previously, Mesoamerica was a region inhabited by diverse civilizations and cultures, many of them in interethnic contact."

Although, the term prehispanic has replaced the term pre columbian in many places. So far there is not a universal term to replace prehispanic but if past is prologue, there will be a new term to replace prehispanic.

=== Mesoamerica ===
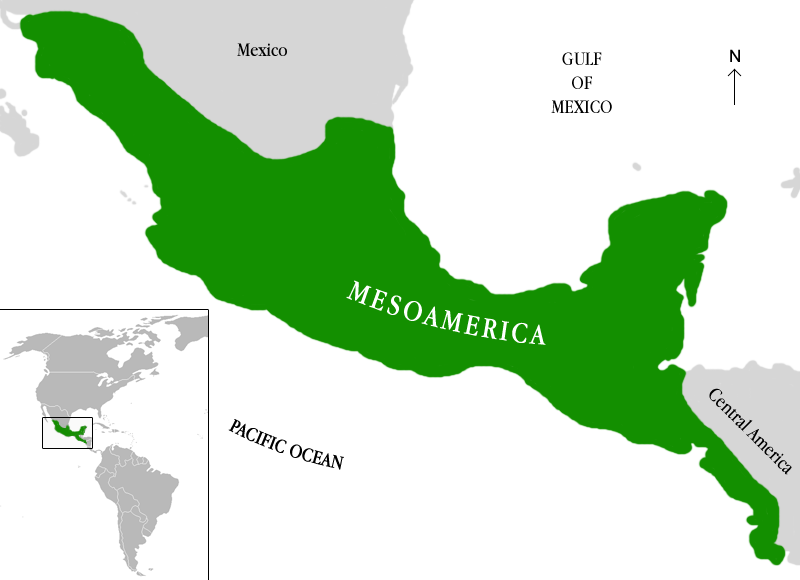
Mesoamerica

Mesoamerica refers to a cultural area. There were several civilizations within Mesoamerica, including the Zapotecs and Mixtecs that are illustrated in the mural. Through marriage and trade among the civilizations, they developed several common characteristics including the cultivation of corn and other crops, trade with other mesoamerican civilizations, similar polytheistic religions, large pyramids in public spaces and other similarities, including a ball game, which we will examine later. Mesoamerica included parts of southern Mexico, Guatemala, Belize, El Salvador, Honduras, Nicaragua, and parts of Costa Rica.

Mountains and Lightning

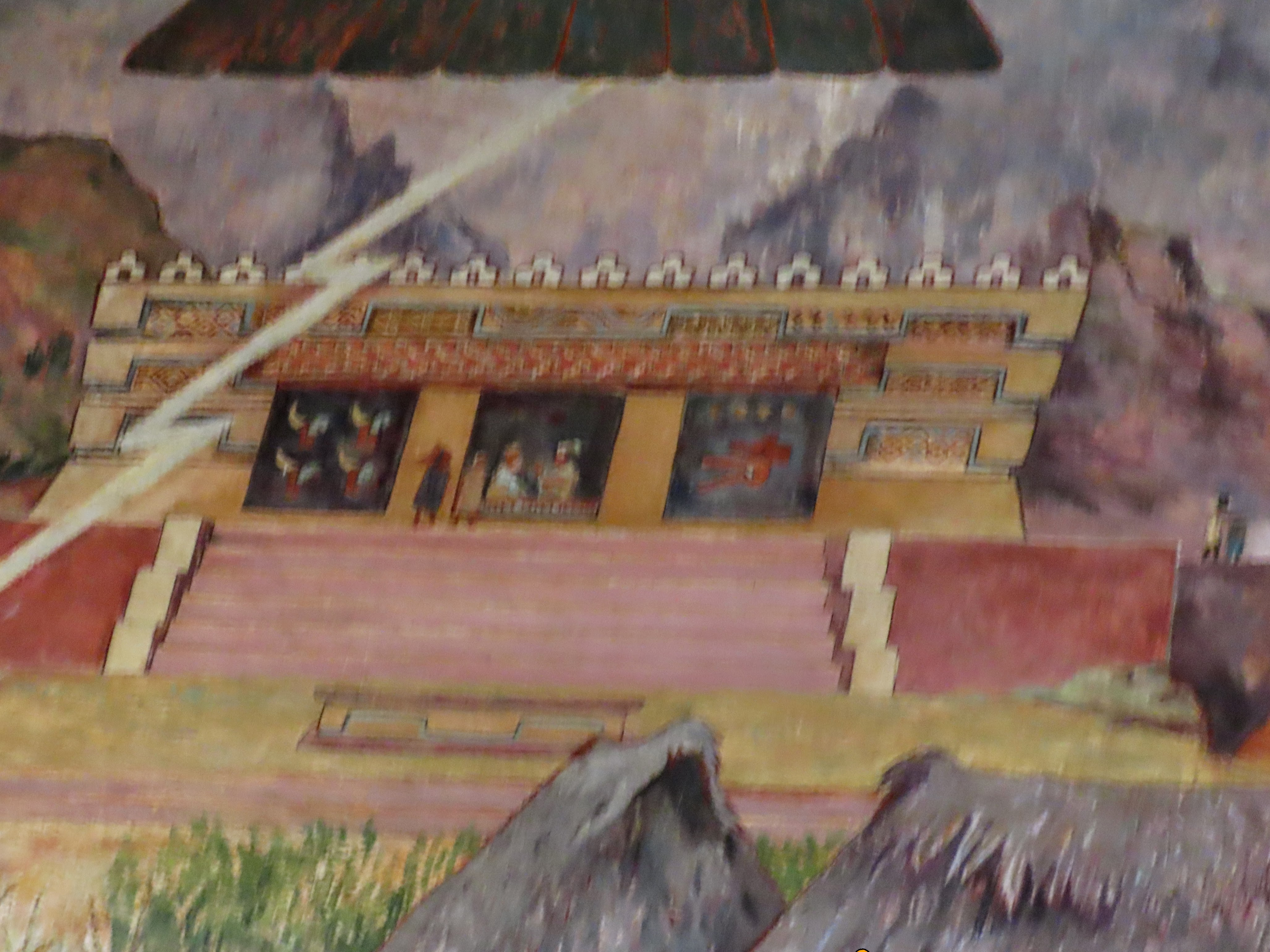
Mountains and Lightning from the mural

The top left corner of the prehispanic panel depicts a mountain and the other two panels of the mural also contain mountains, a reminder that 90% of the State of Oaxaca is mountainous. This terrain has strongly impacted the history and myths of Oaxaca as reflected in several elements of the prehispanic panel. For example, the isolation created by the Sierra Madre de Oaxaca mountains and the Sierra Norte de Oaxaca have helped to generate and sustain 16 formally registered indigenous peoples of Oaxaca.

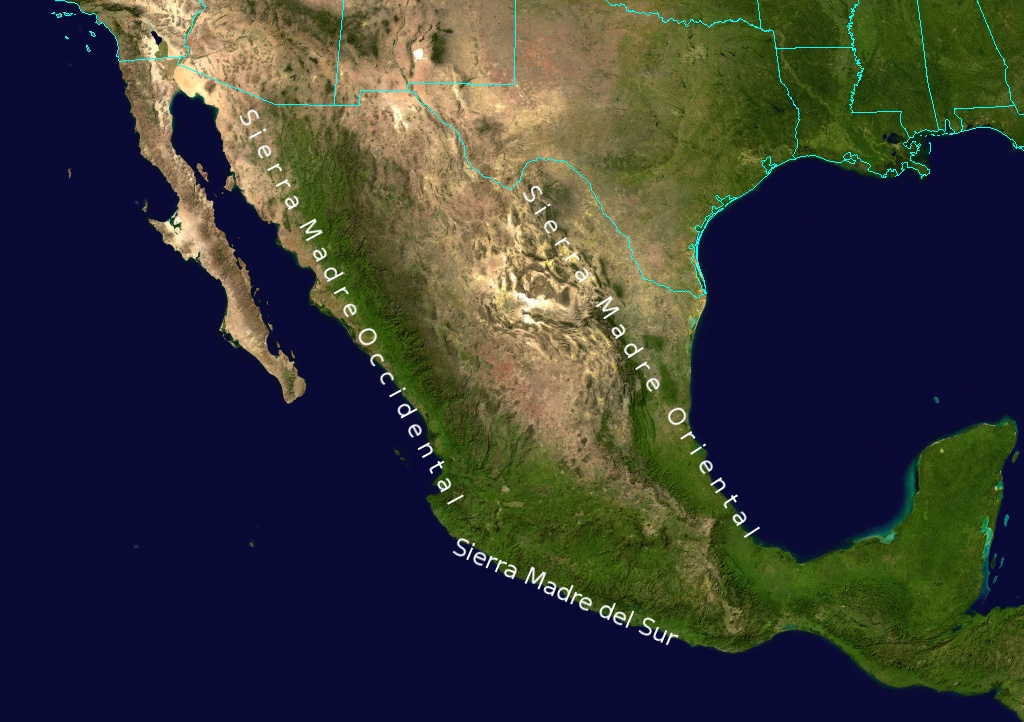
Sierra Madres of Mexico

=== The origins of the mountains of Oaxaca and other geological phenomena ===
Pangea and the continents formed from Pangea

Three hundred million years ago, fragments of the crust were grouped together in a landmass called Pangea.

Prevailing science explains that Pangea broke into sections called tectonic plates. These plates, sometimes thought of as the Earth’s crust float on the mantle of the Earth.

Over millions of years, these plates came together to form continents. The section of the North American Continent where we find Oaxaca comprises four of these plates. They are the North American Plate, the Pacific, the Cocos and the Caribbean .

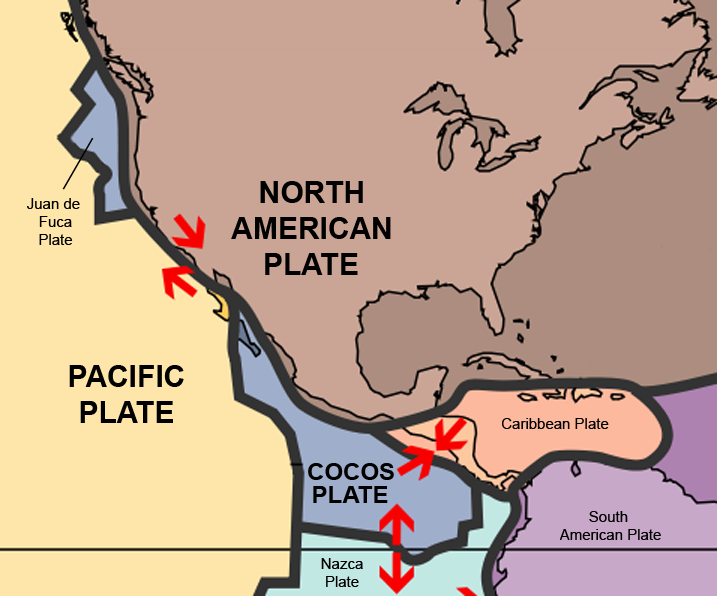
The four tectonic plates impacting the geology and history of Oaxaca

The arrows on the map of tectonic plates indicate that the plates are constantly moving in different directions. It does not take much imagination to predict that the collision of large land masses, even moving at a snail’s pace, will cause havoc. This movement created the Sierra Norte. It also created volcanoes in the Oaxaca area. The ash from these volcanoes some twenty million years ago combined with moisture and under pressure crystallized and formed the green stone that is prominent in Oaxaca. You see it in sidewalks, colonial buildings and even in two thousand year old buildings at Yagul and Monte Alban. Oaxacans call their greenish metamorphic stone cantera. The English translation for cantera is quarry.

=== Earthquakes ===
The mountains are created by constant, hardly perceptible movements within the earth's crust. This leads to earthquakes. We will examine the impact of earthquakes in when discussing the building of churches in New Spain.

=== Monte Albán ===
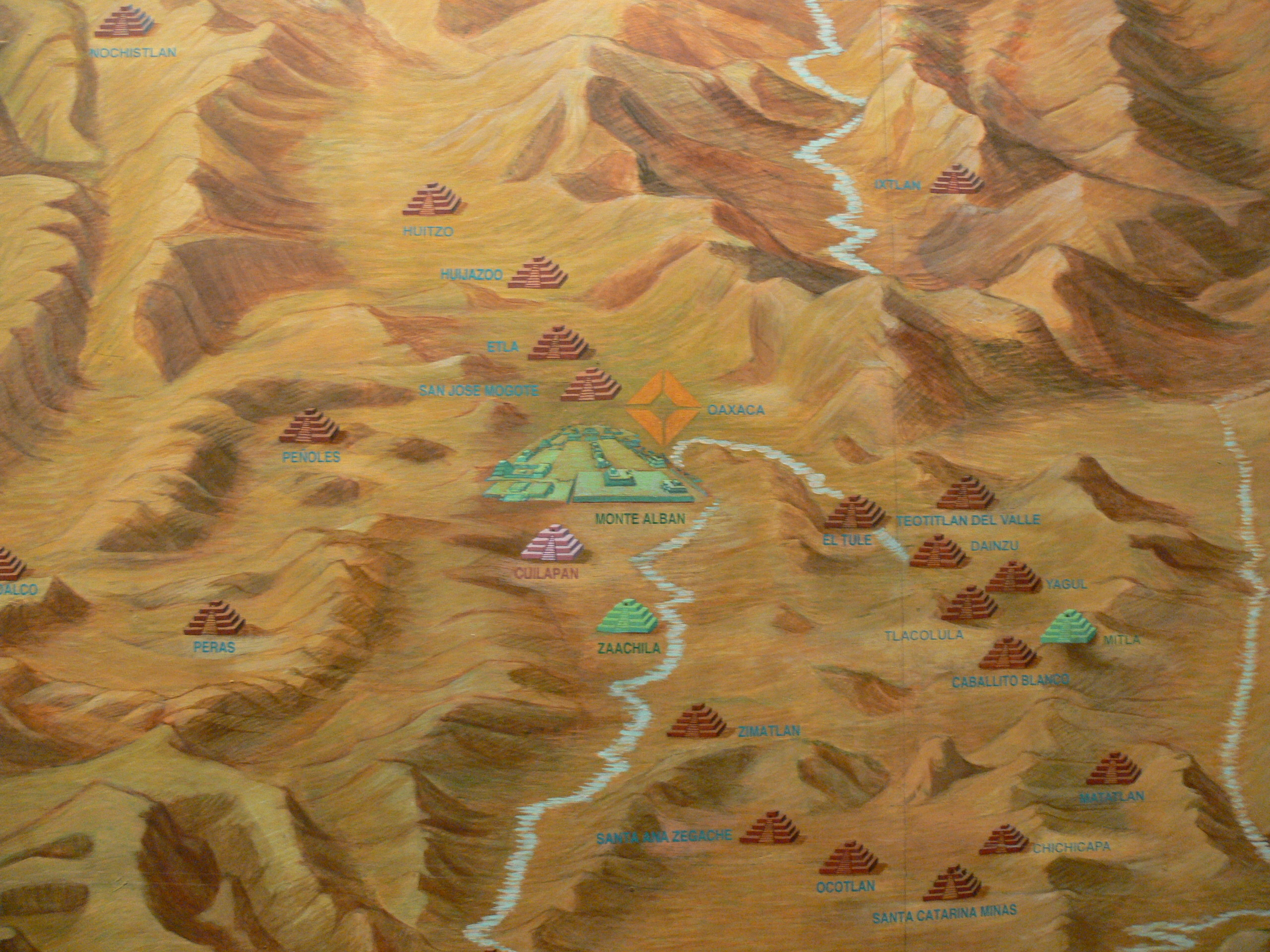
The mountains around Oaxaca (Monte Albán).

The prehispanic city state called Monte Albán, appears in green in the map. Some 20 other prehispanic settlements also appear on the map, represented by pyramids. An immense lake, supposedly in the Oaxaca Valley could have been a source of food. A leading Oaxacan archeologist informed the present author that researchers have not discovered fishbones at Monte Albán, raising questions about the Atoyac River and an imagined lake as a source of protein for the inhabitants of Monte Alban.

Lightening bolts and Cocijo

The top left corner of the panel also depicts Lightning bolts emanating from the sky, evoking the god Cocijo.

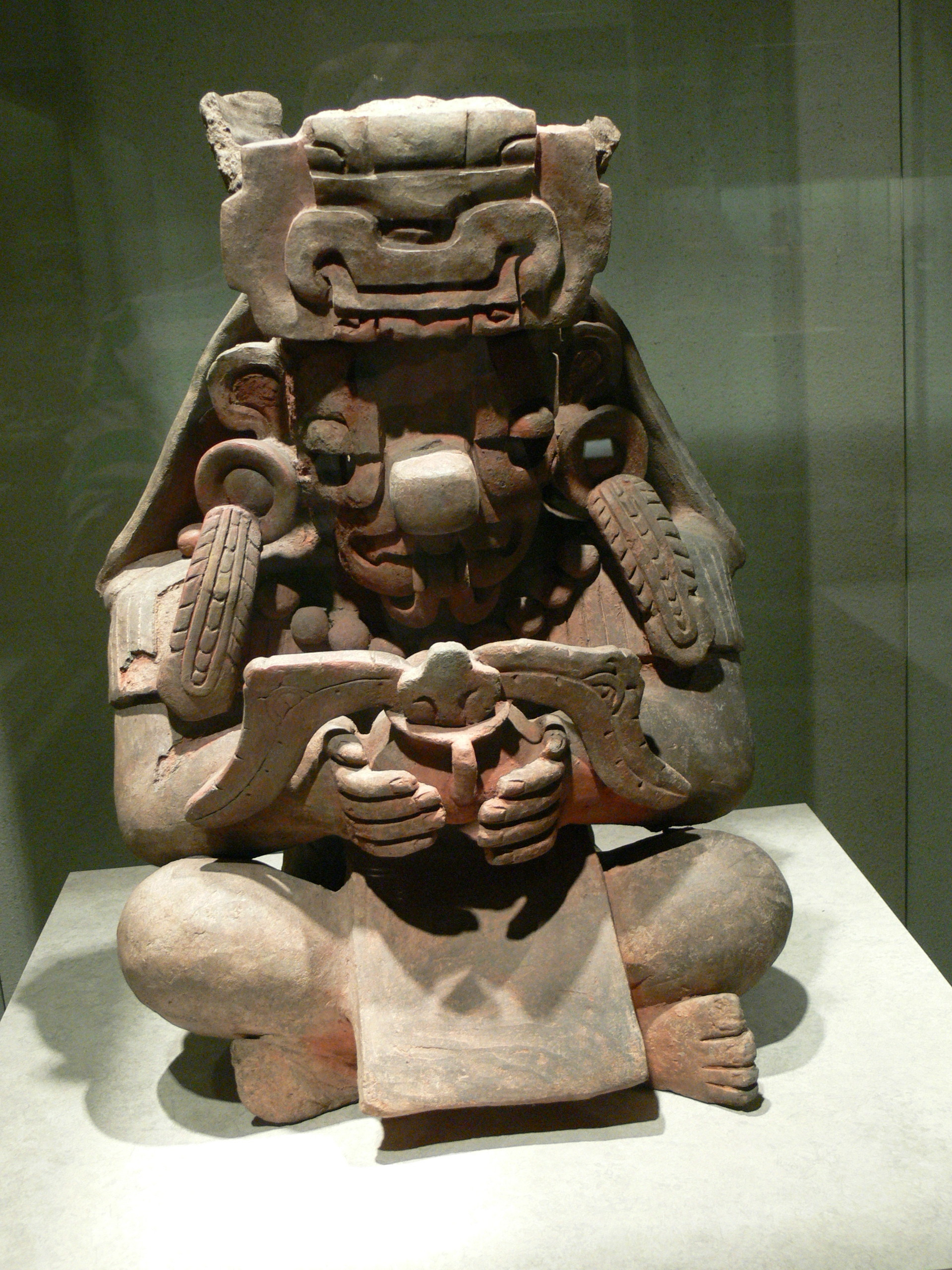
The God Cocijo from the National Museum of Anthropology in Mexico City, originally from Monte Alban ( 200-500 AD )

Note the jaugar-like face of the statue, the Jaguar being a much-reverred icon at the top of the prehispanic food chain. Also note the large cobs of corn, larger than we might expect from 2,000 years ago. The Cocijo statue is called a funeral urn because many similar large objects have been discovered in Zapotec grave sites. They are called urns because they are hallow recipients. However no signs of human remains have been discovered in the vessels, leading archeologists to speculate that the urns were filled with water, to quench the thirst of the dearly departed during their journey in the underworld.

Lightenng bolts hint at the power that Zapotecs and Mixtecs saw in lightning and the sky--as the source of life. And García Bustos also depicts Lightning bolts sending energy to the maize (corn) in the milpa.

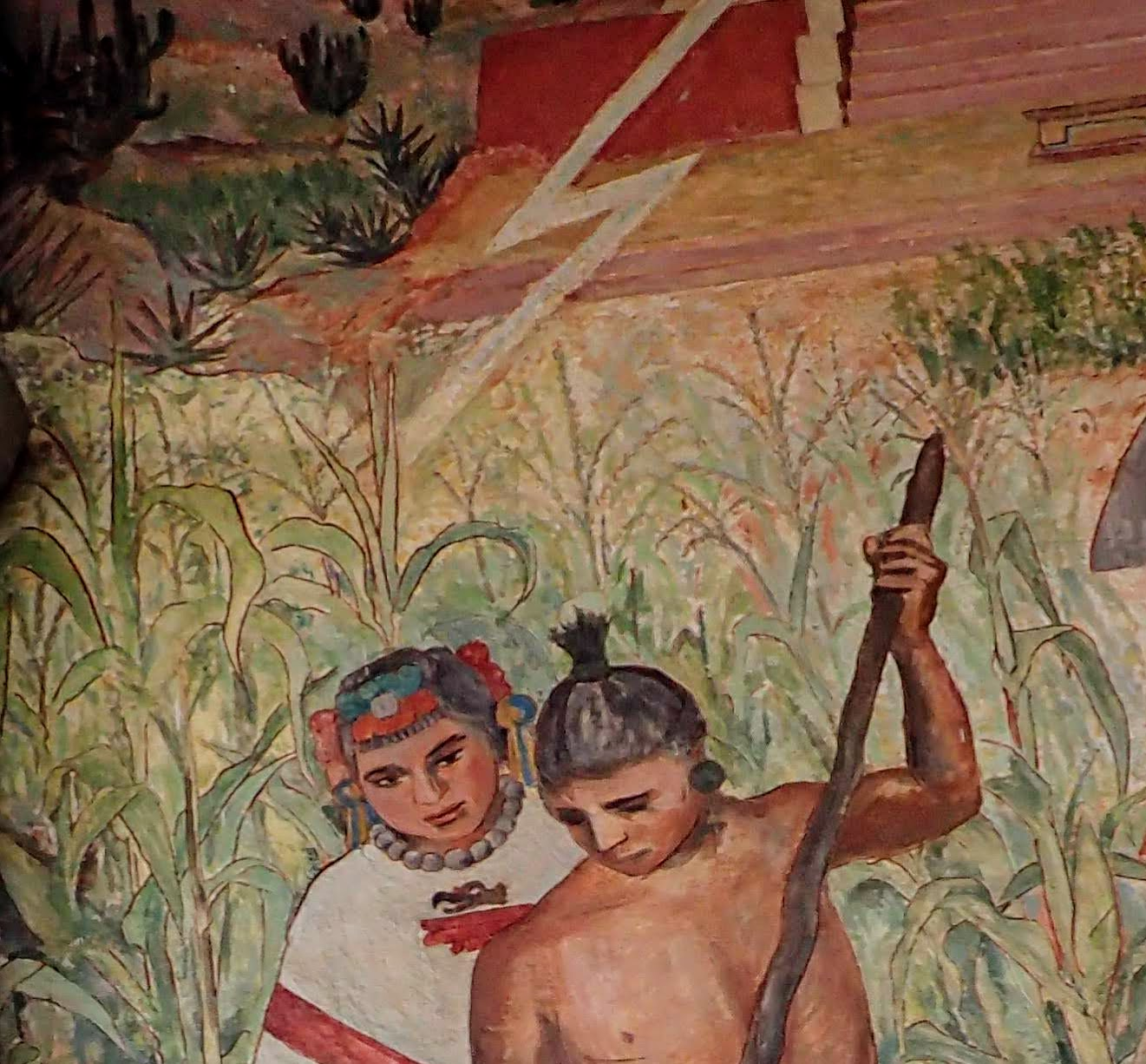
Lightning sends energy to corn

=== Prehispanic Structures ===
Two main prehispanic structures are depicted in the colonial panel. A palace in the top left of the panel, introduced above, and a thatched open air gathering place in the middle of the panel, pictured below. Often teferred to as a palapa. This type of structure is featured in the National Museum of Anthropology in Mexico City, as it is imagined it appeared at San José Mogote, a precursor of Monte Albán in the Oaxaca area, also depicted below.

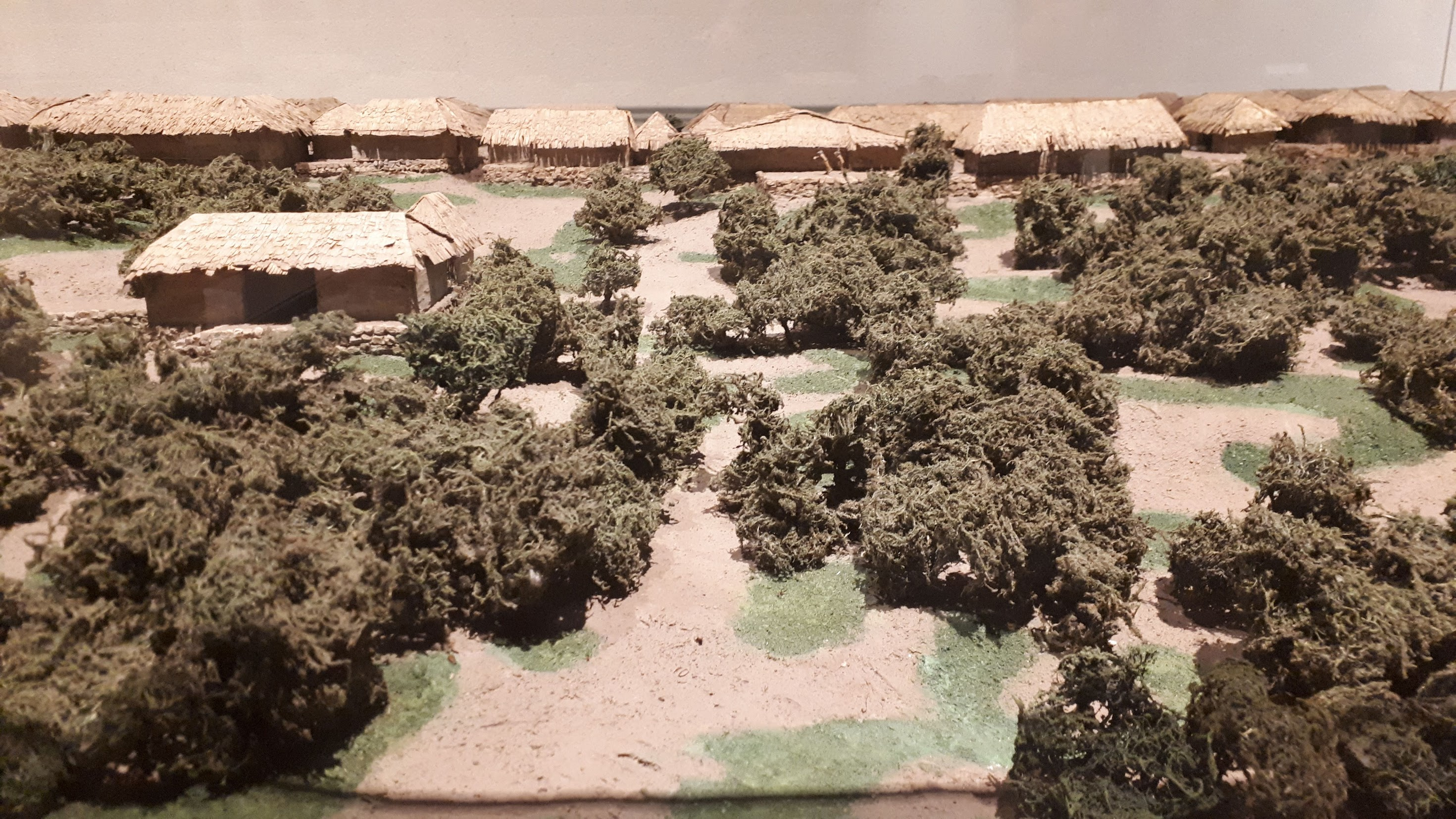
San José Magote

Note the barely-visible red pods against the thatch of the roof in the image below. Red or green, they are produced by guaje trees and contain edible seeds that some Oaxacans consider to be a delicacy. And the name Oaxaca is derived from the word guaje.

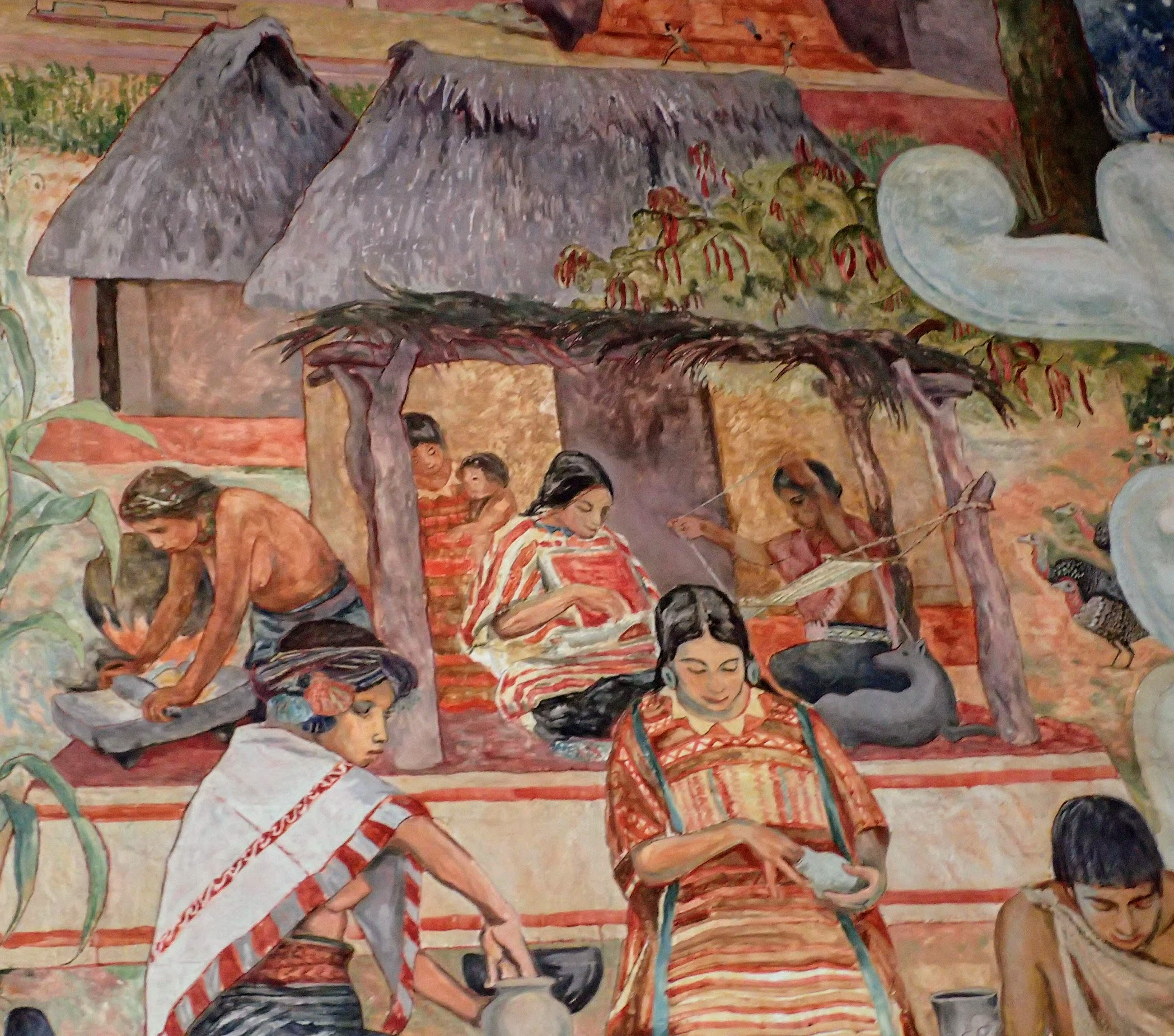
A thatched roof building

The palace-building, below, evokes the design of the Palace of Mitla. Mitla was inhabited by Zapotec and Mixtec people when the Spaniards arrived in the State of Oaxaca in 1521. It was known then as Mictlán, the entry to the underworld and where he Mixtecs and Zapotecs buried their dead. The conquering Spanards transformed the name Mictlán to Mitla.

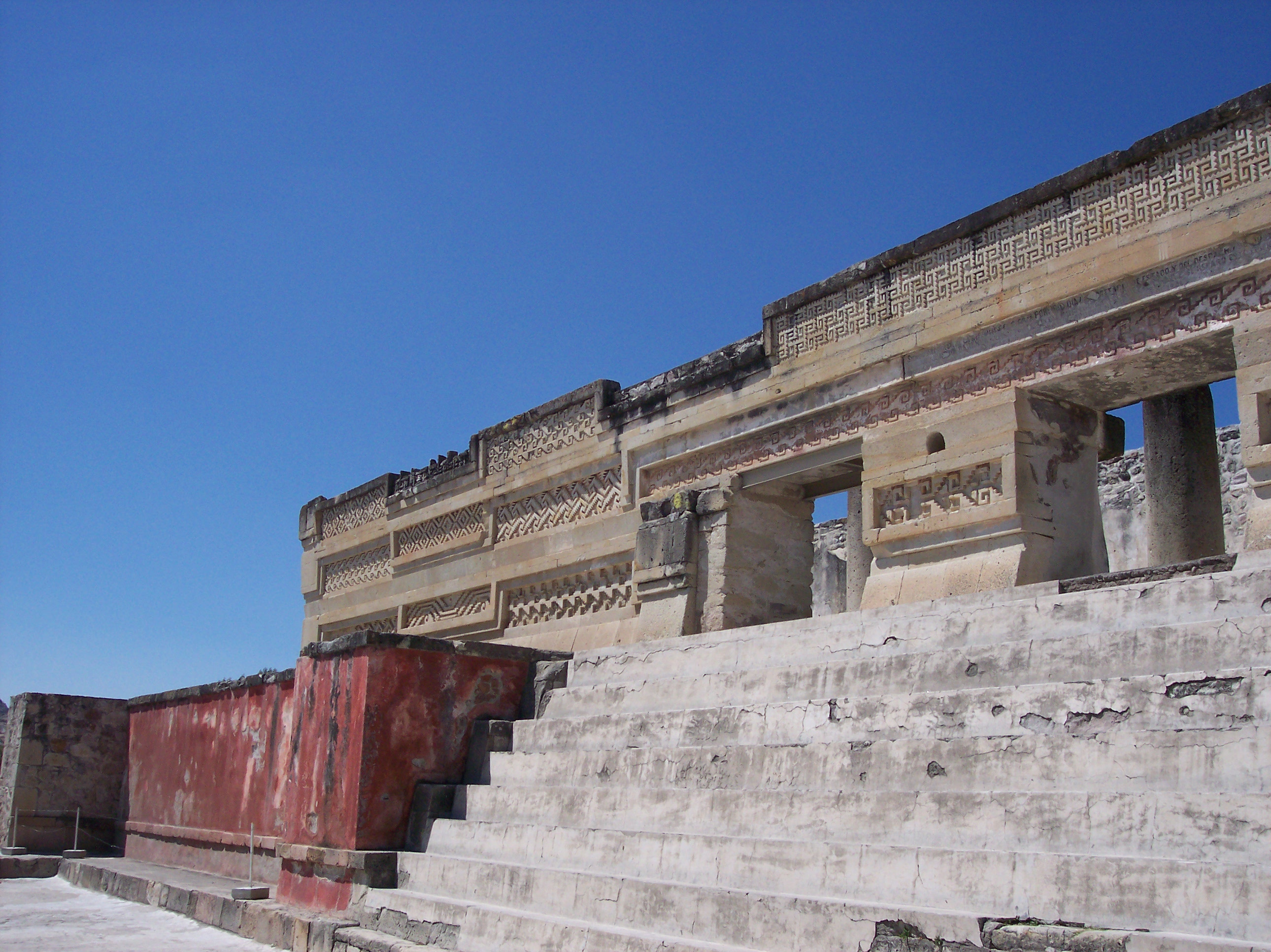
The palace of Mitla

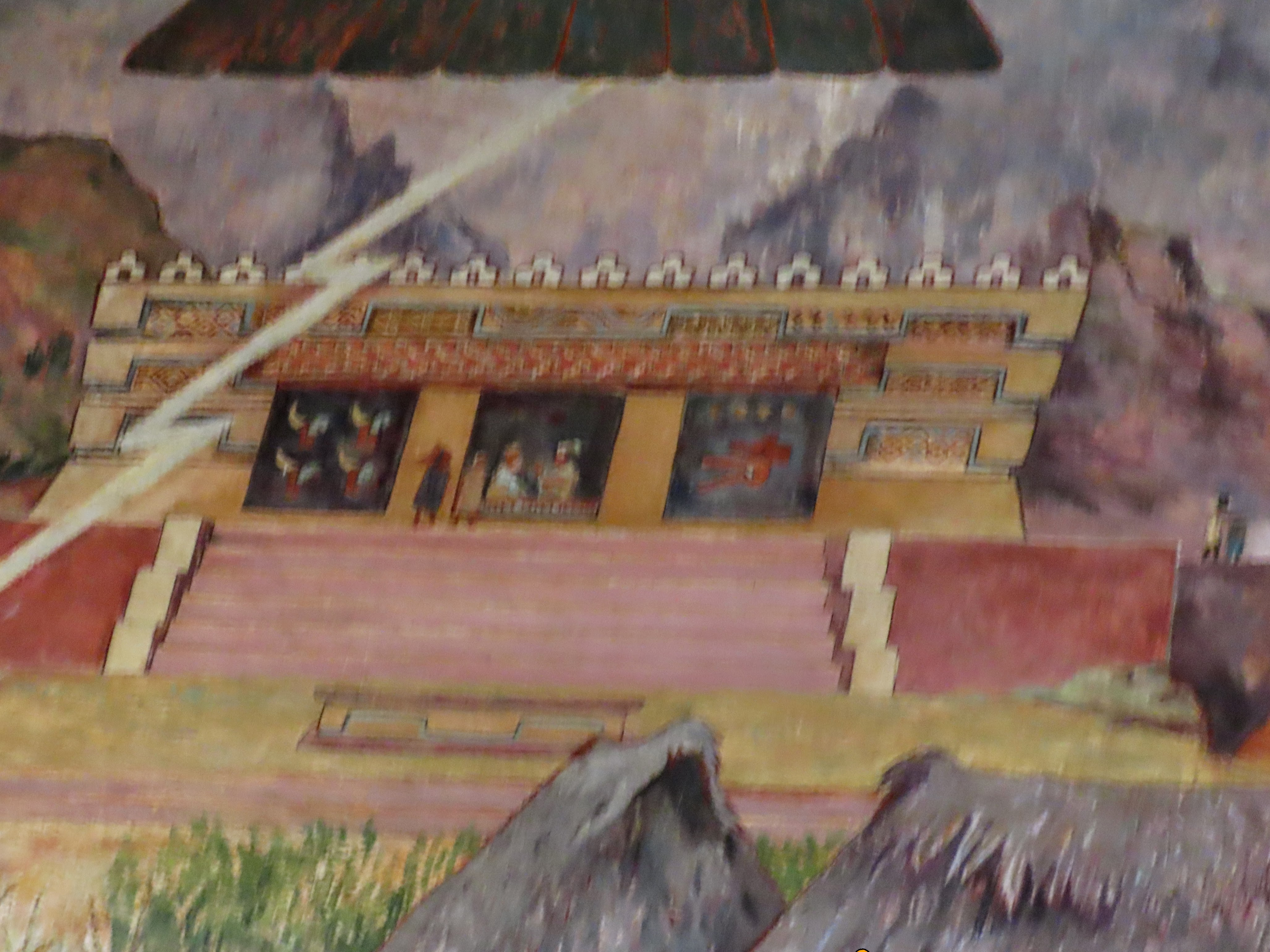
Top image of the prehispanic panel

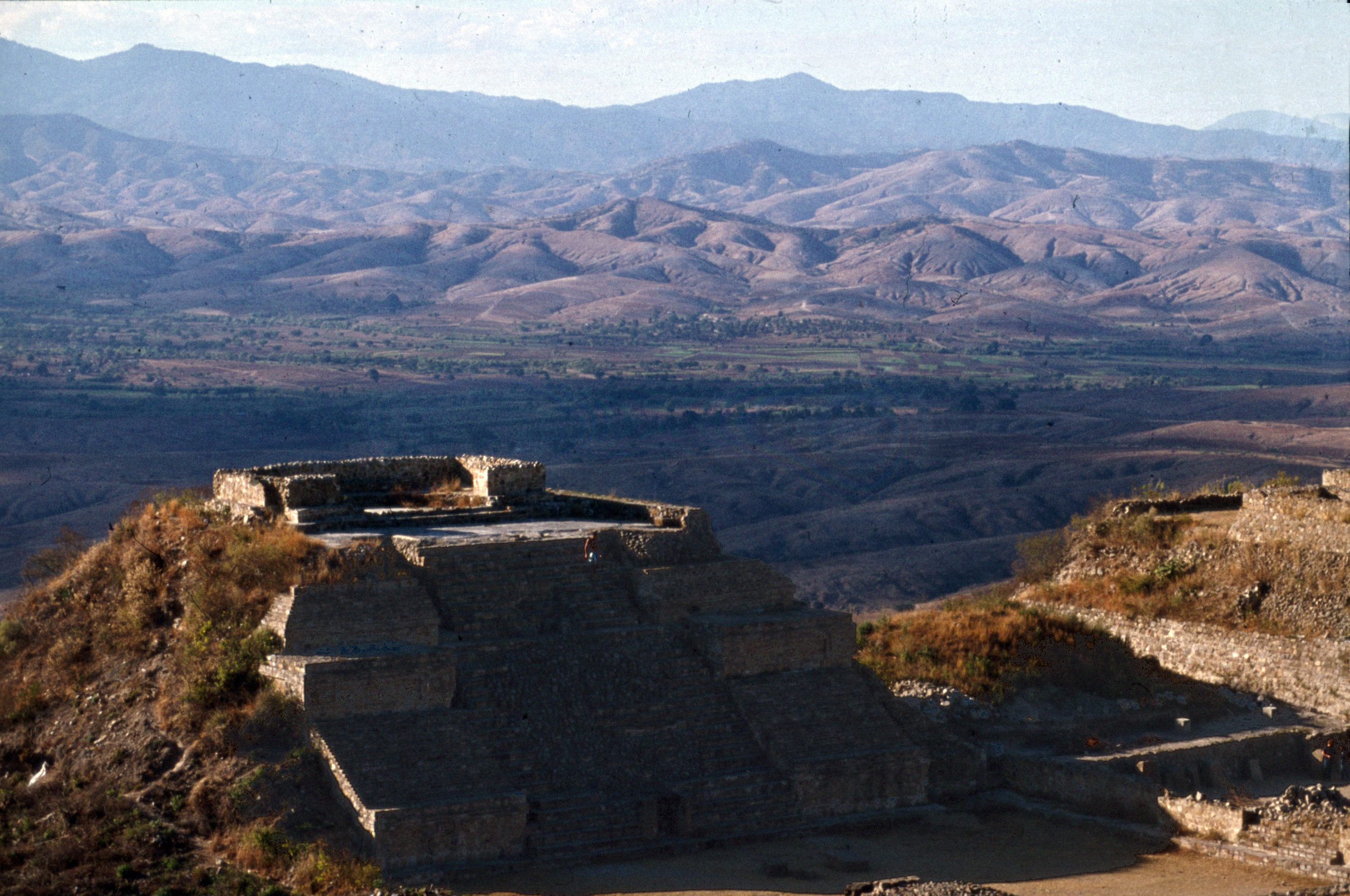
Monte Alban with mountains

The two images above, the palace as painted by García Bustos the palace at Mitla, today, strongly resembles each other. However, floating in the sky in the mural, the palace also evokes the feeling of Monte Albán which is located 400 meters above the valley floor where Oaxaca City sits, as we see in the image immediately above.

Monte Albán

Monte Albán was built over centuries by first leveling a mountain. In approximately 500 BC, some 2,000 Zapotecs from surrounding towns like San José de Mogote, gathered and created the first stage of their new city state.

Recent research using Lazer technology reveals that beneath the current Monte Albán platforms lie earlier buildings.

Nine hundred years after its birth 20,000 people lived at Monte Alban served by 100,000 people in the surrounding area. Monte Albán also enjoyed commerce with Tenochitlan and the Mayan world. It was an advanced community with a calendar, similar to the Aztec calendar, written language, and among other features, a building dedicated to observing the heavens. Unlike Mitla, Monte Albán was not inhabited in the 16th century when the Spaniards conquered what is now the state of Oaxaca.

=== Domestic and Artistic Skills ===
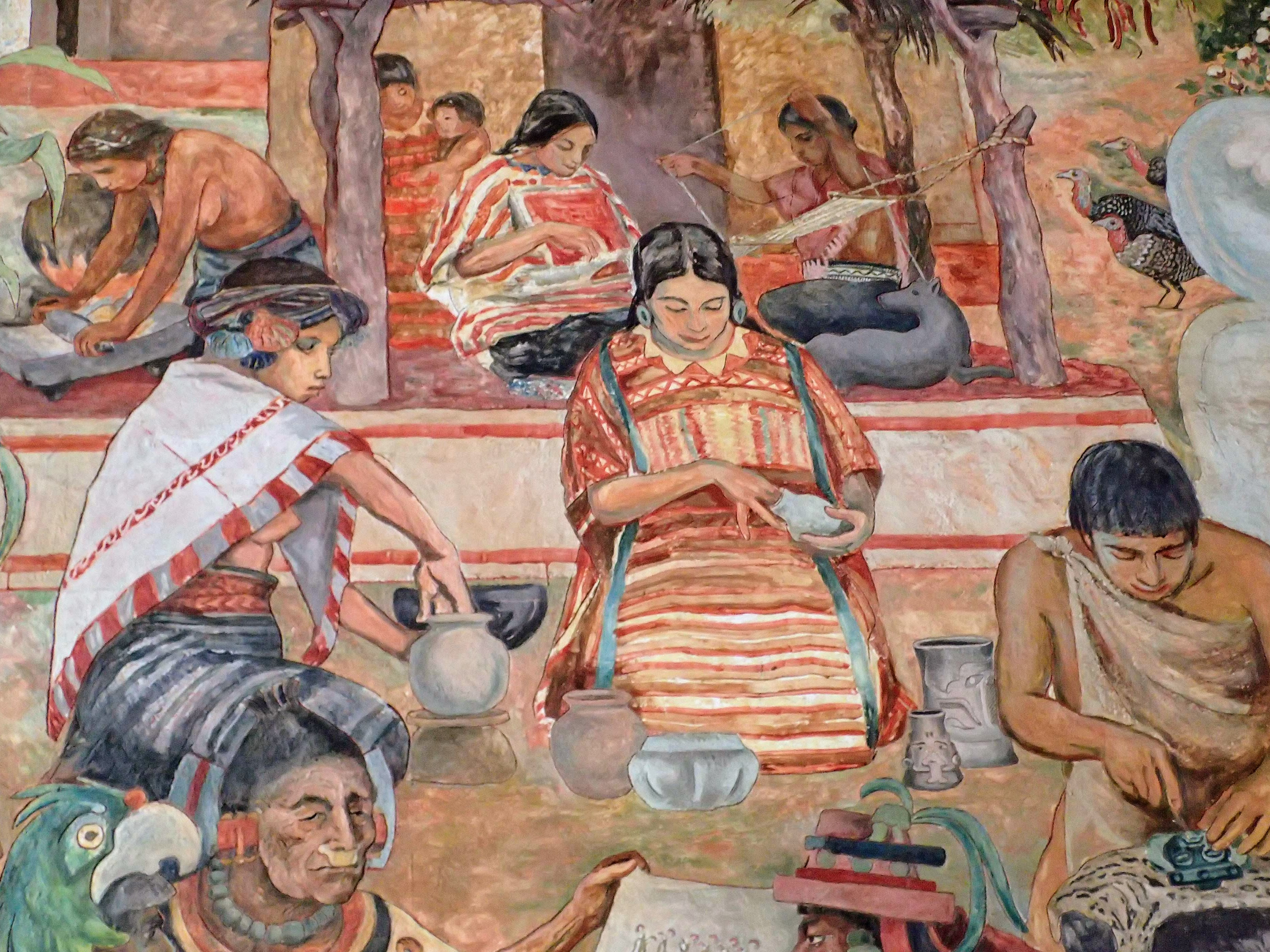
Five domestic and artistic skills

The figure above portrays five domestic and artistic skills from the Oaxaca area and other elements of prehispanic life. Starting with the background image in the top left corner, a woman prepares food with a metate which is used to grind grain and seeds. Metates were first used in México some 5,000 years ago. In the second image in the background, we see an adult tending a child. Children in Mesoamérica faced many challenges. In front of the adult and child a woman sits in her bright gown. To their left, two women appear to be weaving. Below the guaje pods, described above, and to the right are wild turkeys or guajolotes as they are known in México. The gray animals blending into their surroundings and to the left of the turkeys appear to be Mexican hairless dogs known as Xoloitzcuintle, or Xolos.

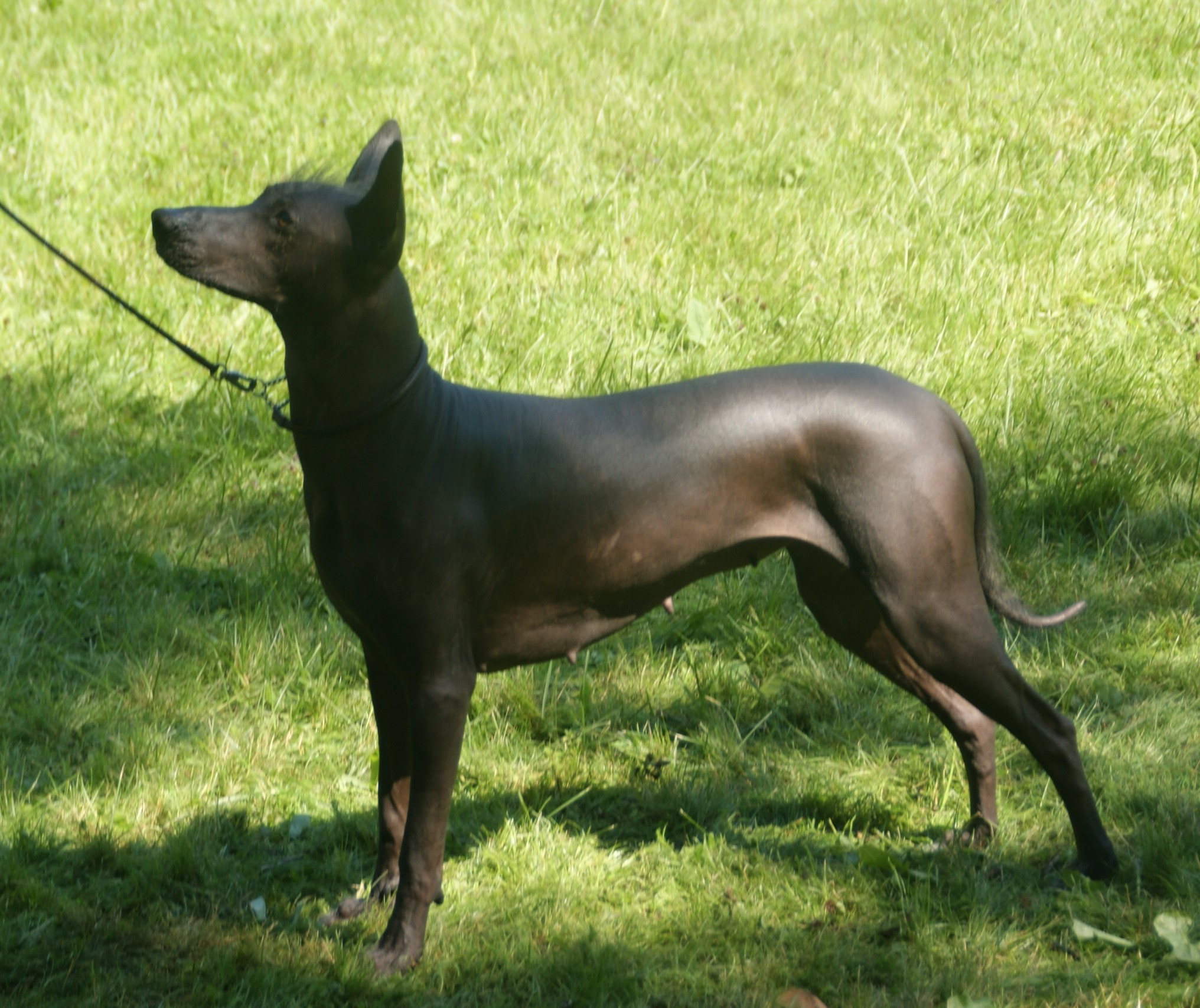
Modern Xolo dog, popular in prehispanic times.

They served as pets, spiritual icons and food in prehispanic times. The ceramic dog below was placed with a deceased person to be a spiritual guide leading the soul on its journey to the underworld.

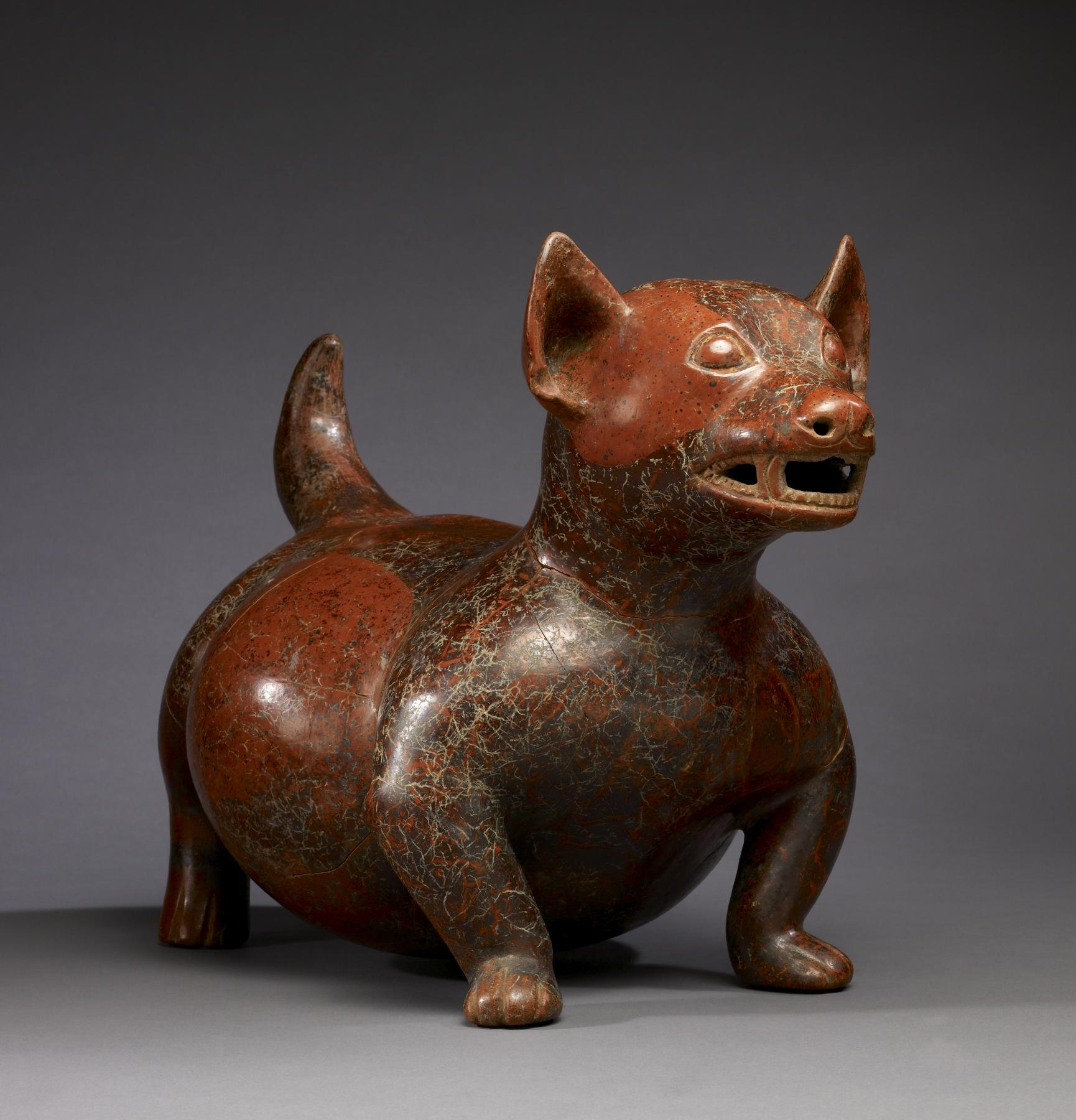
Ceramic Xolo Dog

The two women in front of the dog are shaping pottery. One man in front appears to be carving a mask. Placing all of these crafts surrounding one house makes it look as if people lived in self-sufficient units, making their own pottery, textiles and more. Archeological records from prehispanic times indicate that Oaxacan handicrafts have been normally made in highly specialized, specific communities. So each of the handicrafts pictured here would have been made in a distinct village, in prehispanic times as is often the case today.

=== Agriculture ===
Before Mesoamericans raised crops, they were hunter gatherers. For thousands of years killing and consuming megafauna such as mammoths as their source of protein. With the end of the ice age and the disappearance of large animals associated with it, beginning 10,000 years ago, hunter gatherers transitioned to hunting smaller game such as deer, gathering wild plants and eating insects.

The artist illustrates the birth of agriculture in Mesoamerica with four images. Thus, illustrating some of the earliest instances of agriculture in the World. The wild grass-like image pictured below represents teosintle. This is the grandfather of maize, often called corn. As one can gather from the example of teosintle below, the cobs were minuscule with a few hard grains. Creating soft, sweet corn, in large cobs, from the original wild grass was a major exercise of patient observation and careful selection of the best grains. It appears that the original food value was gained by heating the kernels to make popcorn.

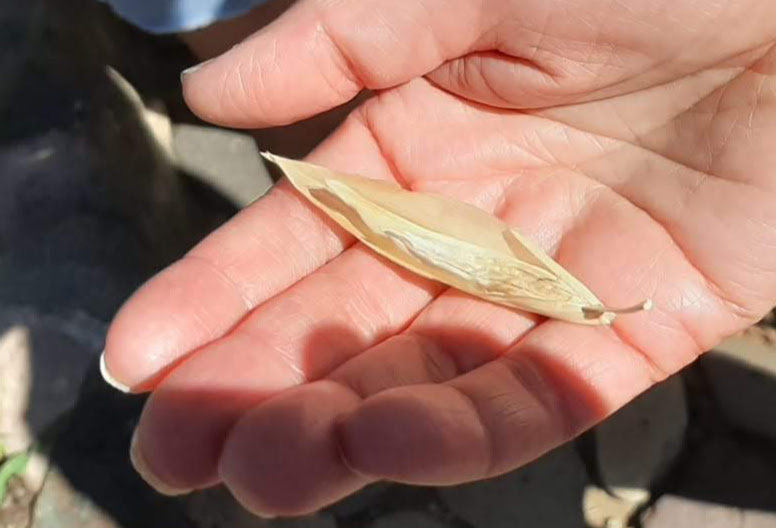
An "ear' teosintle

Some of the earliest evidence of the domestication of teosinte and other plants has been discovered in caves in the state of Oaxaca. Since this research is from 2001. It is not unreasonable to expect that there will always be new research, new locations and revised dates.

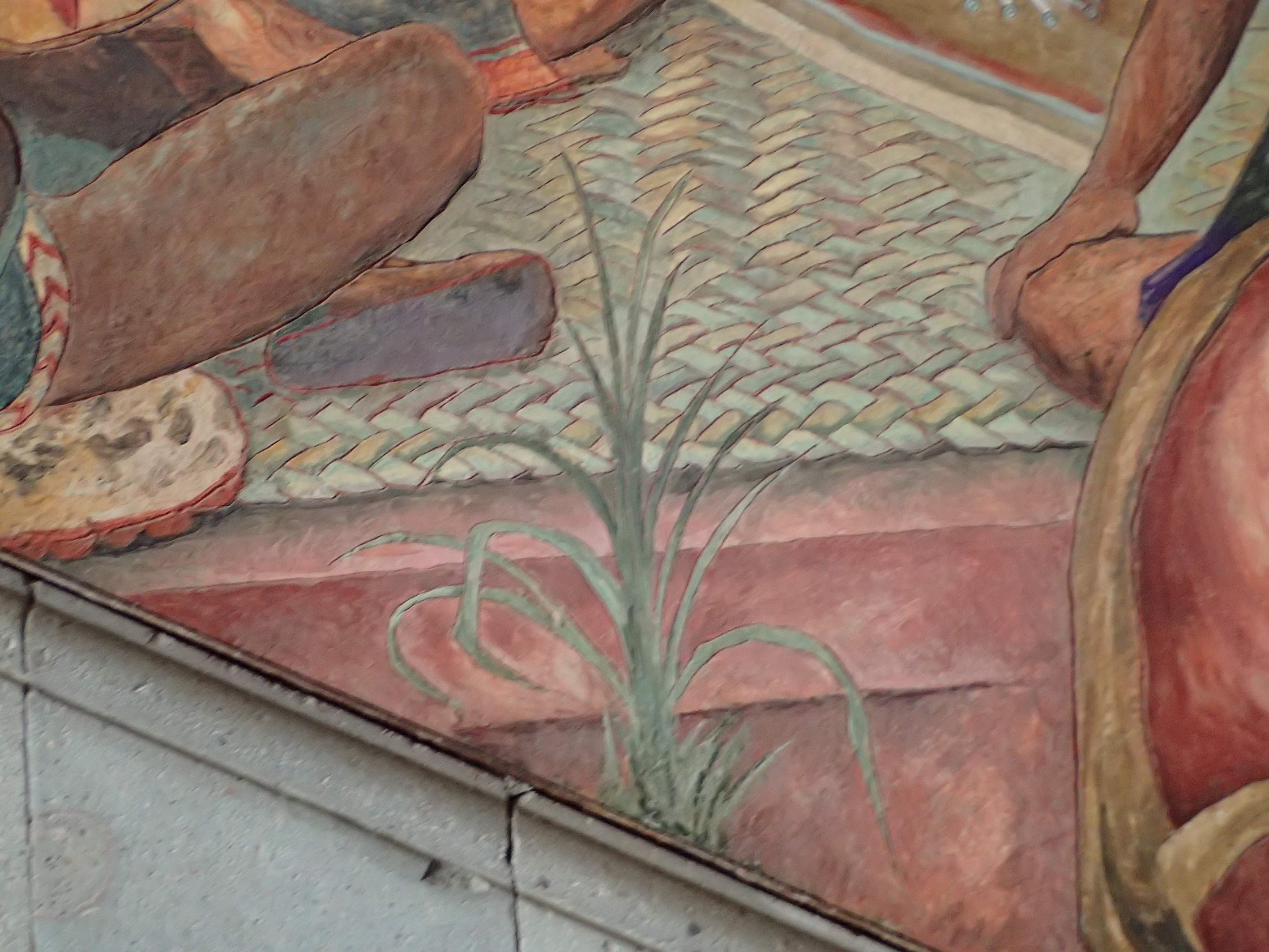
Teosintle

The image below illustrates a family, either probing for edible food, such as roots or insects or cultivating the soil, one of the first steps in organizing agriculture. Farming is a group effort and required the move from a hunter-gatherer phase and into small farming communities such as San José Mogote which is located in the Oaxaca area,

The digging stick being used to probe or to cultivate the soil is a uictli in Náhuatl. After the Conquest, with the Spanish language dominating, it was called a coa.

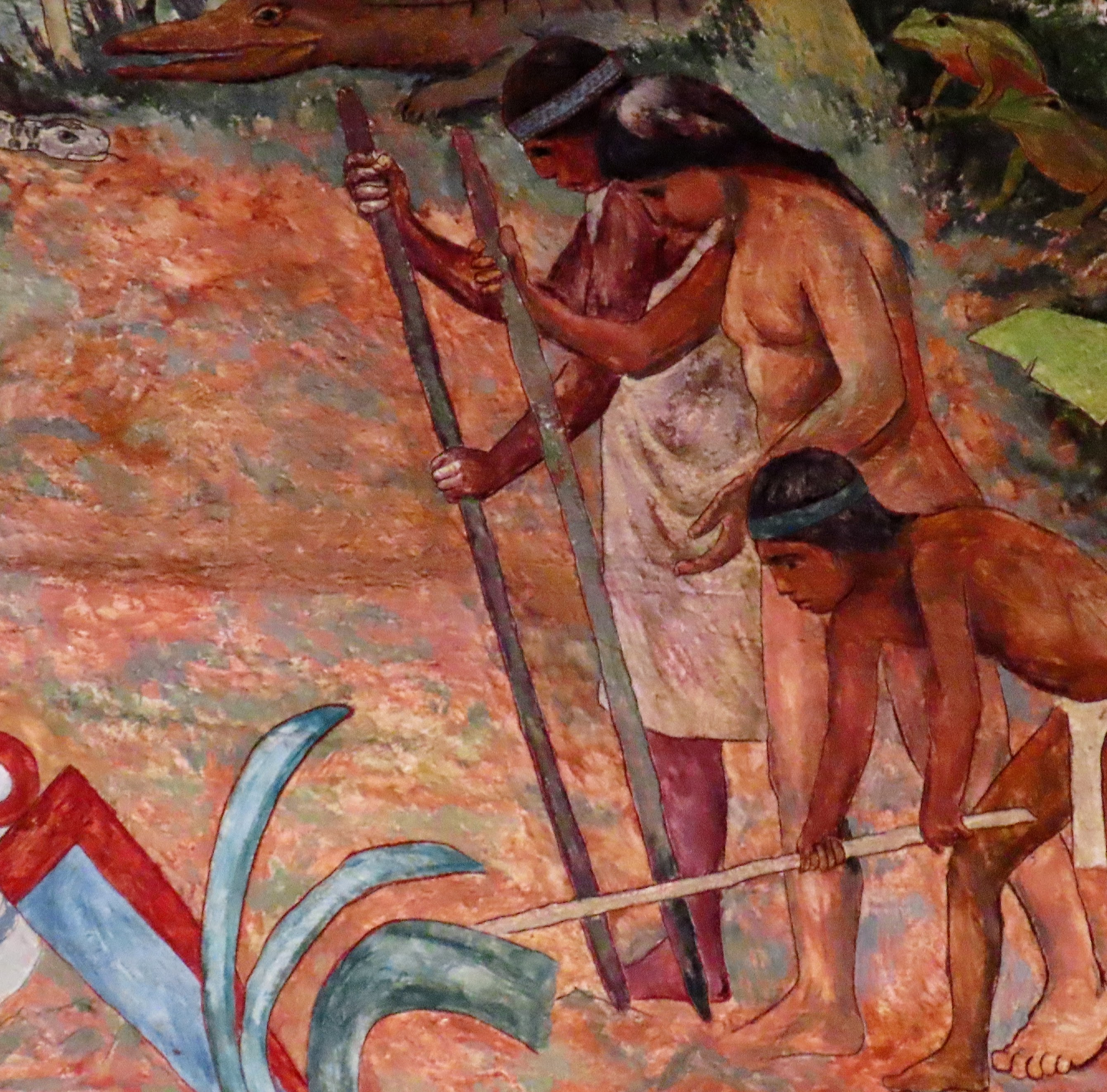
A family probing or cultivating the soil

The next image illustrates a man and a woman working the ground with a uictli. They are working in a milpa where corn, beans and squash grew together in what is now called the three sisters: three compatible plants that support each other and produce a balanced diet.

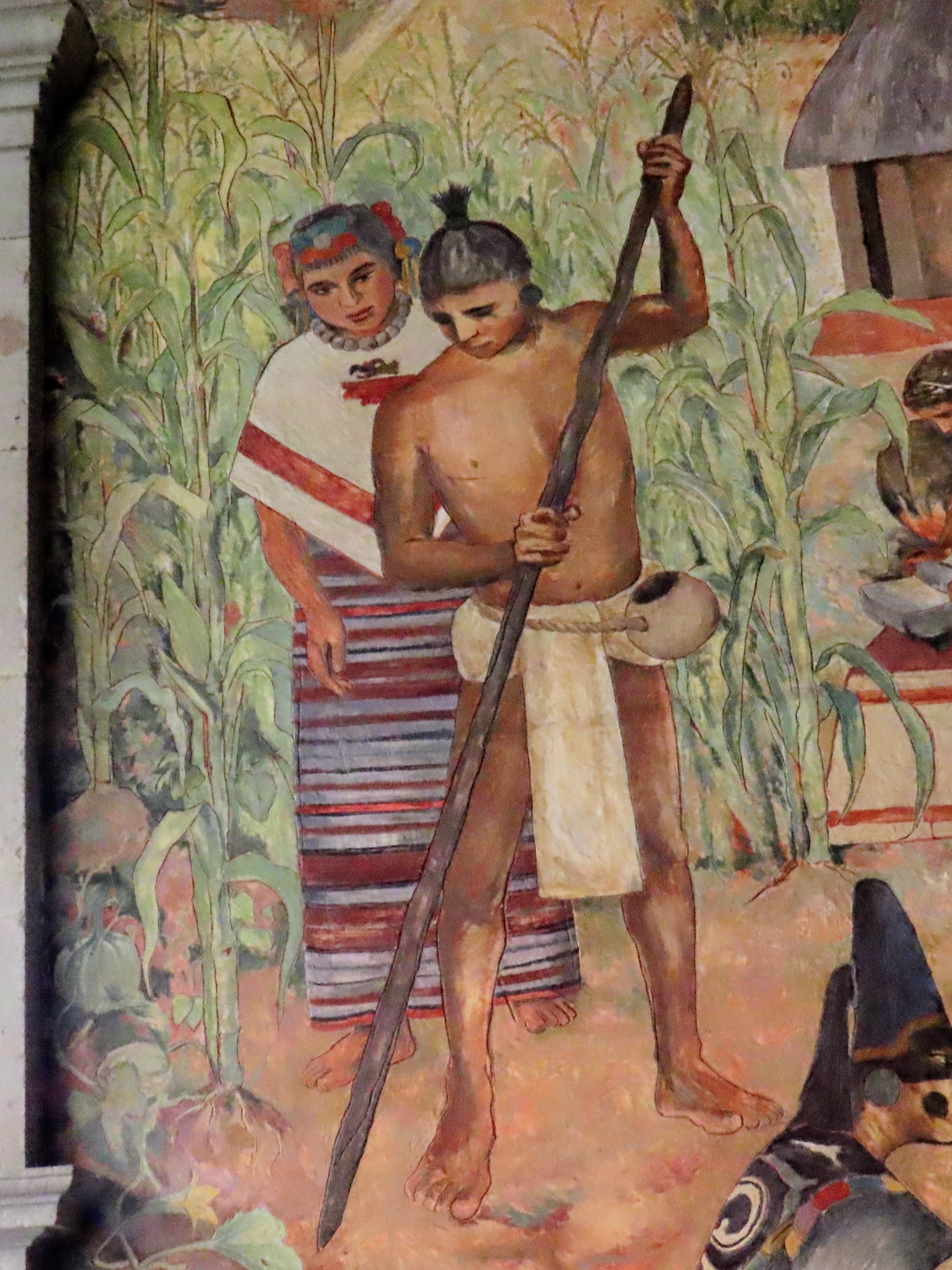
Working in a milpa

The woman's skirt appears to be woven, a step up from the loosely draped garment of the previous figure. Perhaps it was woven at Monte Alban more than 2,000 years ago. In addition to the corn growing behind them, there is squash growing at their feet, as seen in the image below, an element of the three sisters method of cultivation.

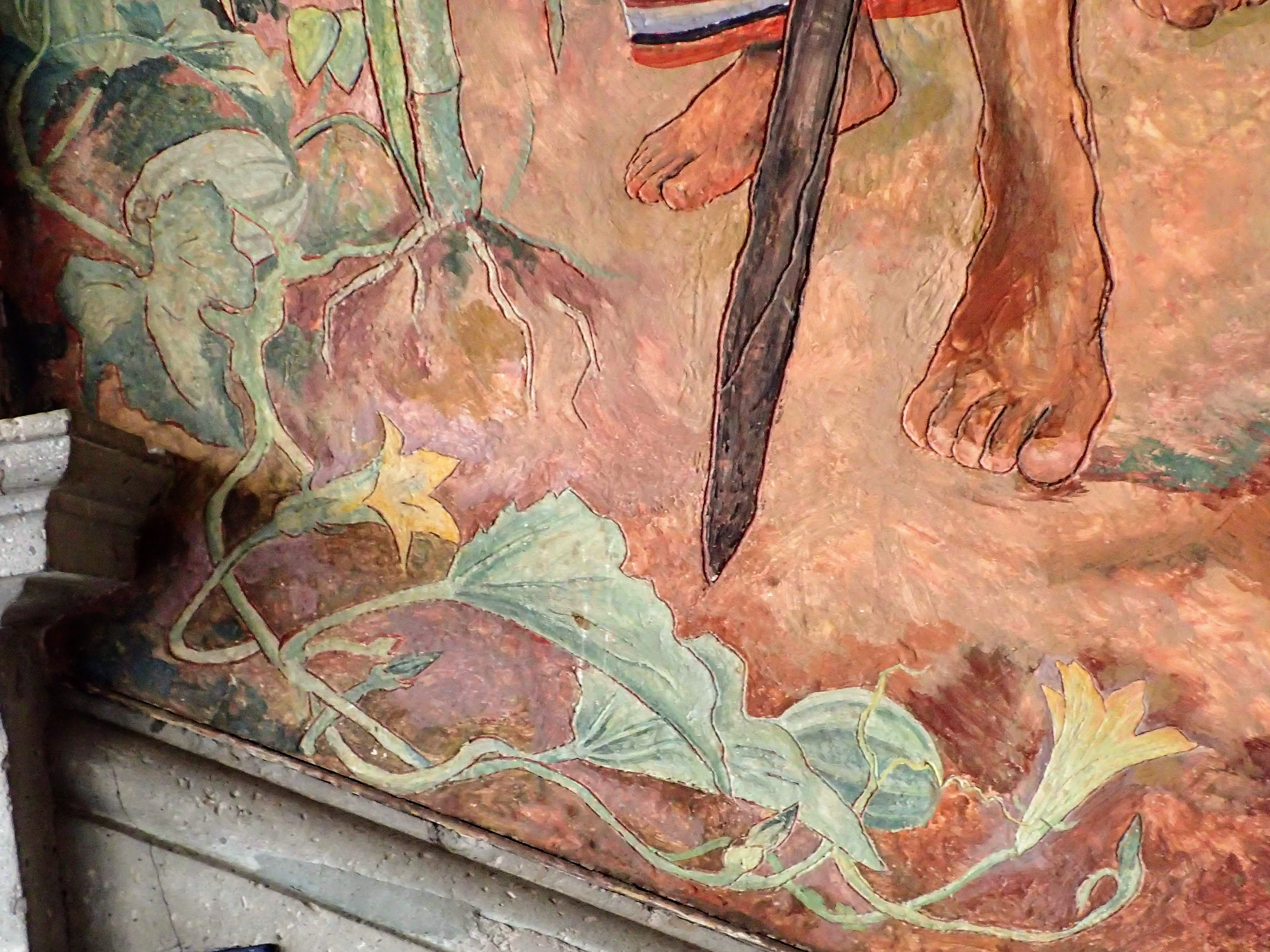
Squash growing in a milpa

The man has a gourd around his waist. Gourds were used as a container for seeds 8,000 years ago, or longer.

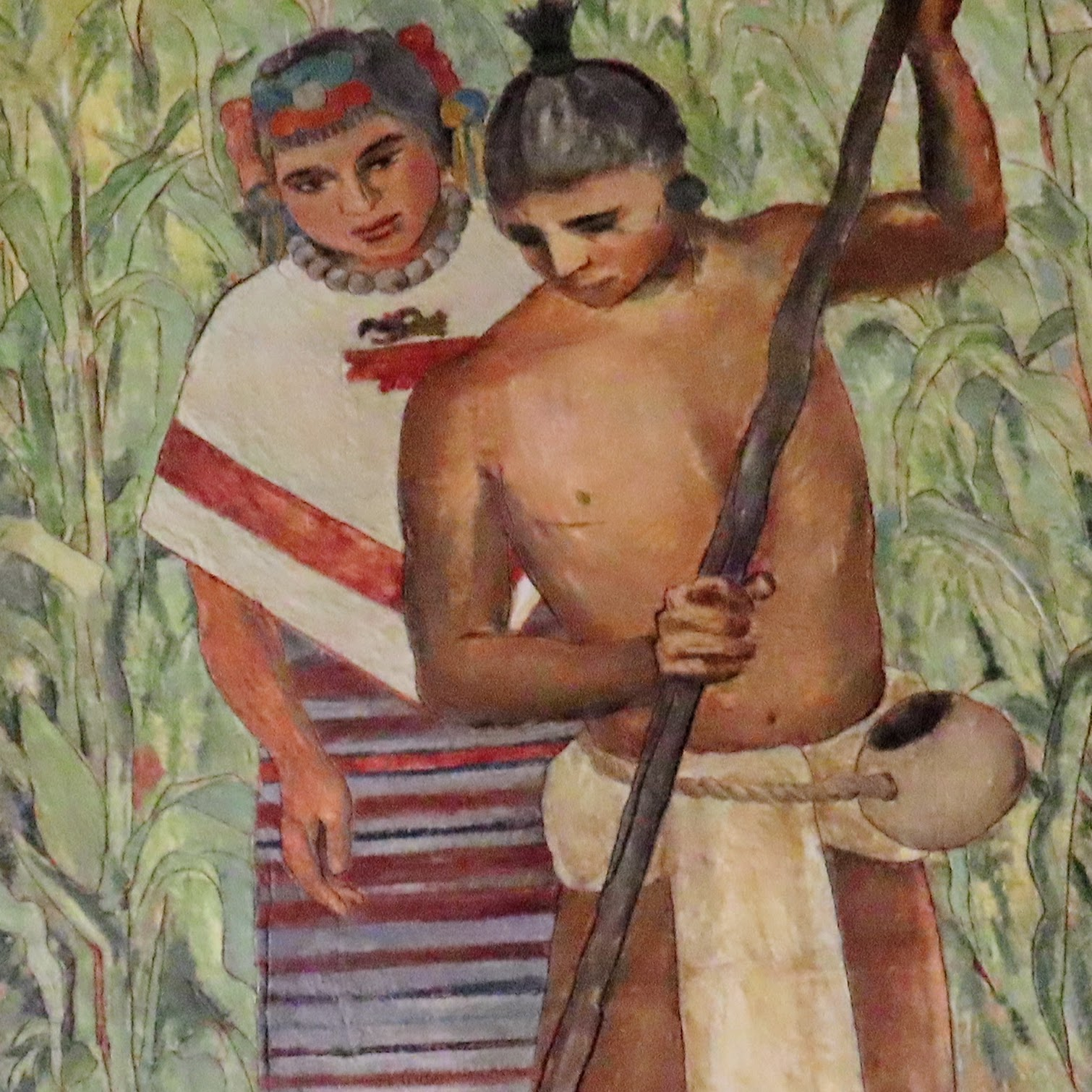
Gourd around the waist

=== Codices ===
García Bustos incorporates accurate depictions of prehispanic codices in his mural, using them to evoke mythology and history. The Mixtec codices are rich sources of information and they have been examined in many books and articles. High definition versions of the codices can be studied online.

==== Mixtec and Mayan codices ====
The existing Mixtec prehispanic codices, either six or eight in number, and their Mayan counterparts are the only historical and genealogical documents that survived the Spanish conquest. Famously, in the Mayan peninsula Bishop Diego de Landa Calderón led his campaign against idolatry and human sacrifice --by destroying codices. Codices created after the conquest were made with Spanish influence and leadership as was the case with the so-called Aztec codices and the 2,500 page Florentine Codex, in which Bernardino de Sahagún led the documenting of ithe ndigenous worldview and culture, including agriculture, between 1540 and 1585.

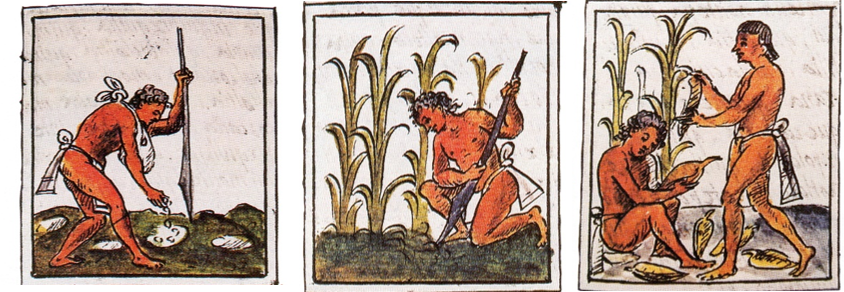
Cultivating corn from the Florentine Codex

Based on scenes from the mural, it is not impossible that the Garcia Bustos relied on the Florentine Codex as a source of inspiration.

Also, García Bustos, true to his pursuit of realism in his creations, used several images from the Mixtec codices. Some codices trace the histories of known rulers and contain date notations that have been deciphered. Other stories portrayed in the codices are largely mythical. Although they are not literal truths, myths reflect the way that people think and in Mesoamérica are used in many places, including art, architecture, poetry, and religion. Codices convey that the gods played a role in the birth of rulers, thereby establishing the rulers connection to the divine right to rule from one generation to another.

The image below, from the mural, is an example of García Bustos replicating content from a codex in his mural. This image is almost an exact reproduction of a panel from page 13 of the Vienna Codex. An article by Jansen and Pérez Jiménez interprets this image as one of several related to the foundation and ritual carried out in the east palace of heaven.

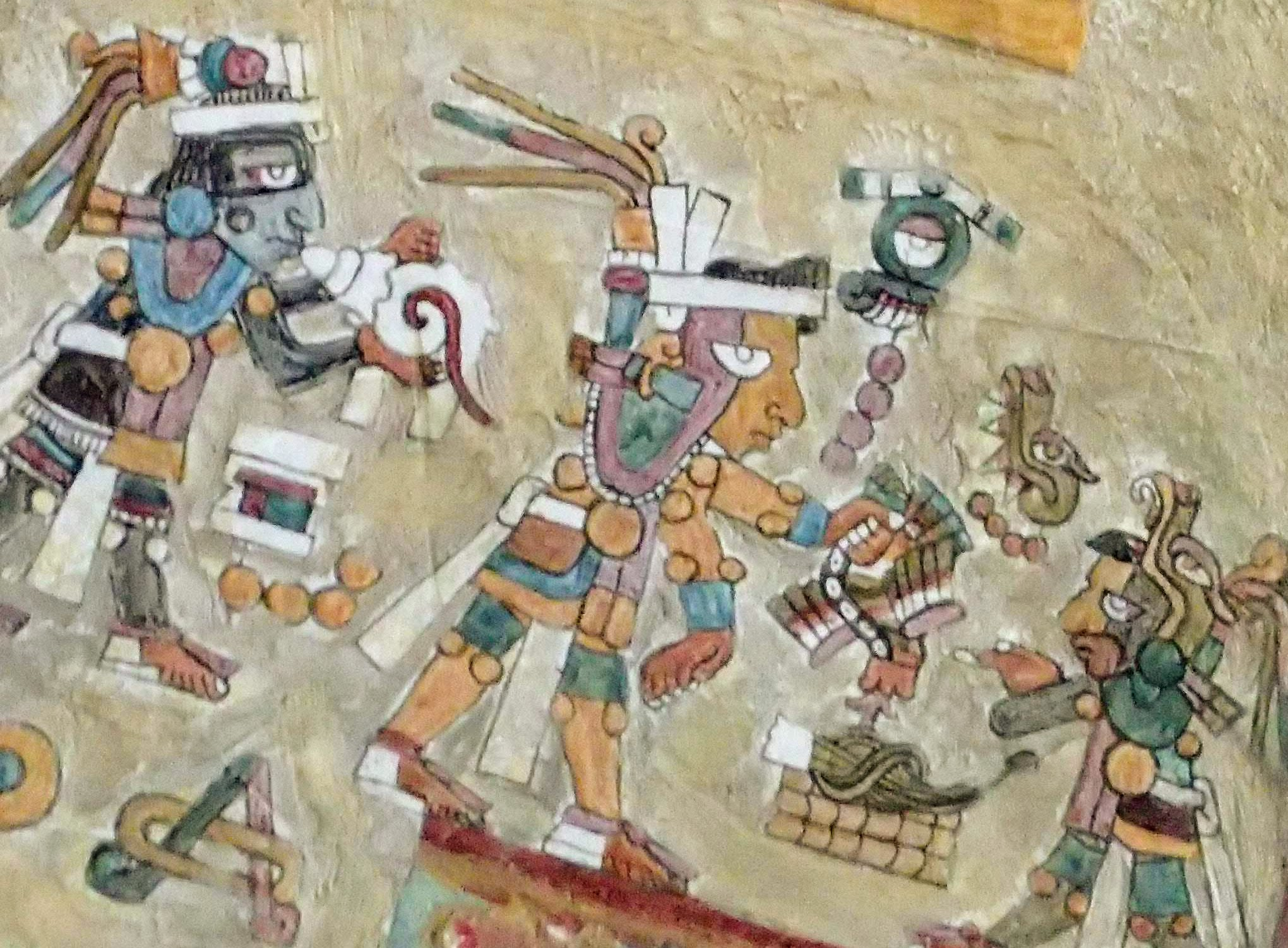
Bustos' reproduction from a codex

At the bottom left of the figure above there is a capital letter A, joined with a stylized circle around the middle. Normally this A-O symbol is attached to one of four symbols, thus forming a year sign used in the 52 year-cycle Mixtec calendar. Since this symbol does not include one of the four additional symbols, the explanation from a reputable research site is that the capital letter A symbol with an O in the middle is a symbol for the beginning of time. Similar images with large "As" appear on all three panels of the mural. Incidentally, Mesoamerican did not use what is called today the Roman or Latin Alphabet.

==== Painting a Codex ====
The mural illustrates a Mixtec artist painting a codex. The folded pages are strips of tanned deer hide covered with a white gesso. The original colors used were gold ochre, burned sienna, carmine red, turquoise blue, olive green, grey and black. But García Bustos chose to use other colors and less crimson than the original codices, more inline with the overall colors of the mural.

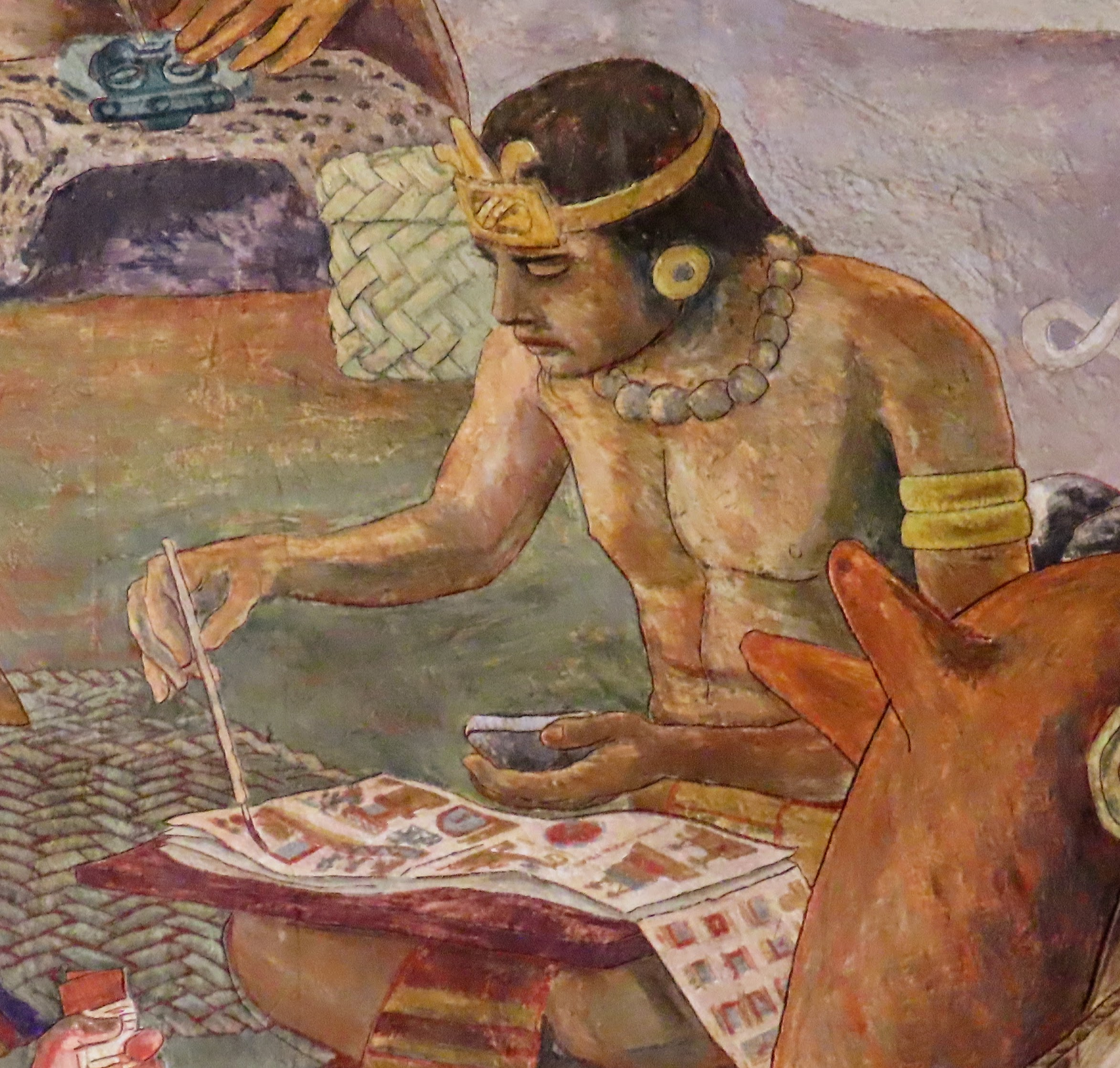
Painting a codex, from the mural

==== Mixtec Tree of Life from the Codex Vindobonensis Mexicanus ====
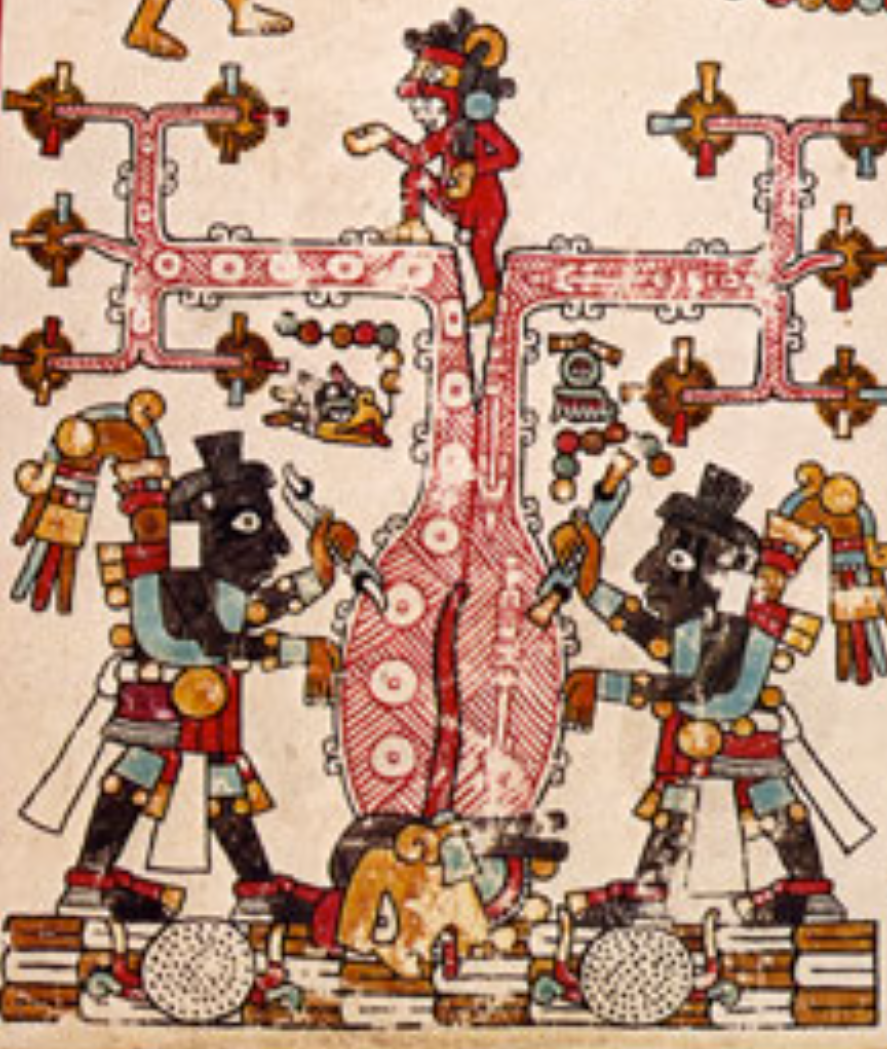
Mixtec Tree of Life from the Codex Vindobonensis Mexicanus. This appears to be the image used to inspire the depiction below from the mural. (Note the irregular surface, representing a Pochote tree on both images.)

The above image depicts the Mixtec tree of life found on page 37 of the Codex Vindobonensis Mexicanus or the Yuta Tnoho Codex. The image below shows how Garcia Bustos depicts the same image, incorporating the key elements of the original: the crossed limbs of pochote trees, a newborn child, and the flowers that are very stylized in the original.

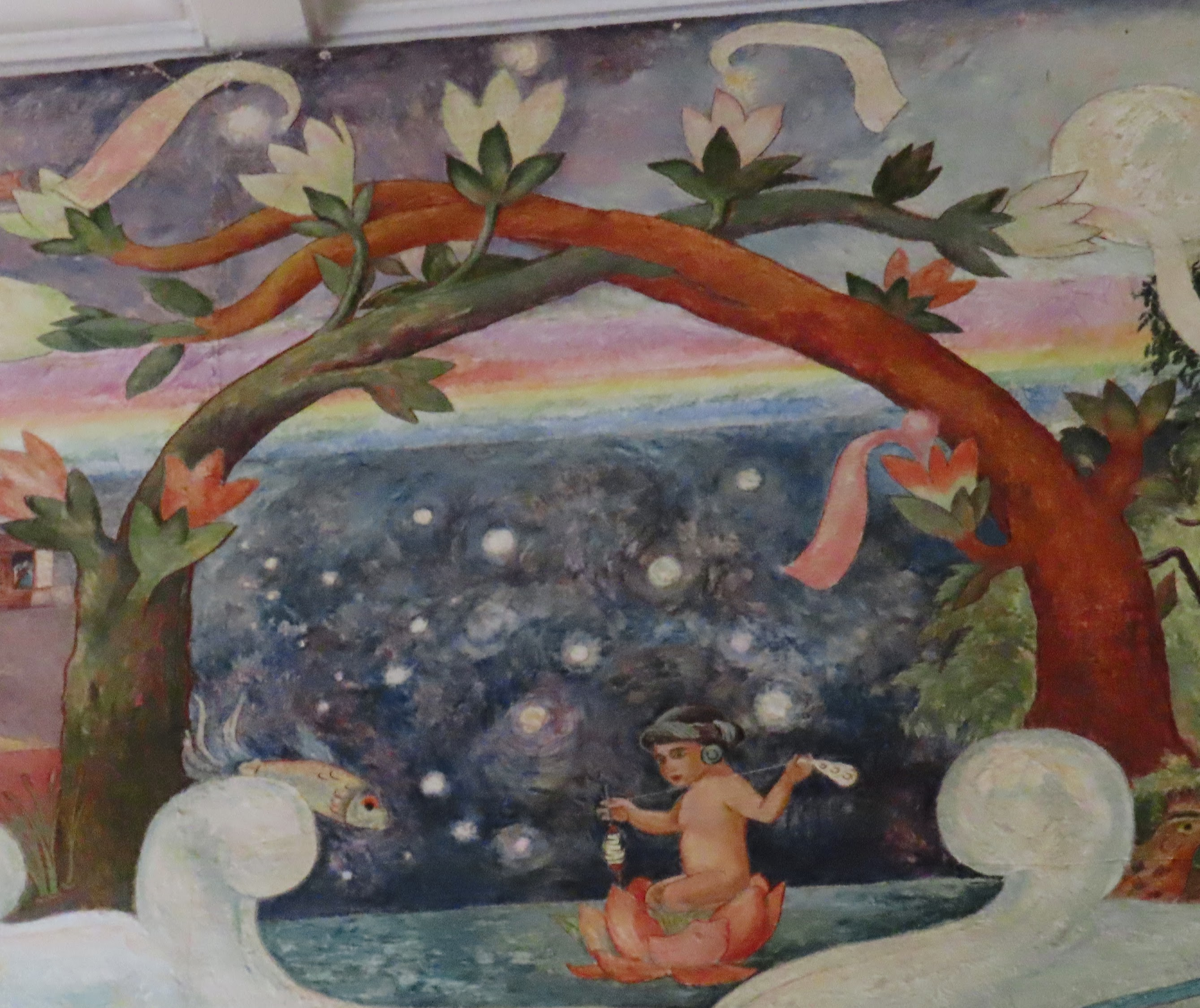
The crossed limbs of a Pochote tree on the Mixtec tree of life, from the mural.

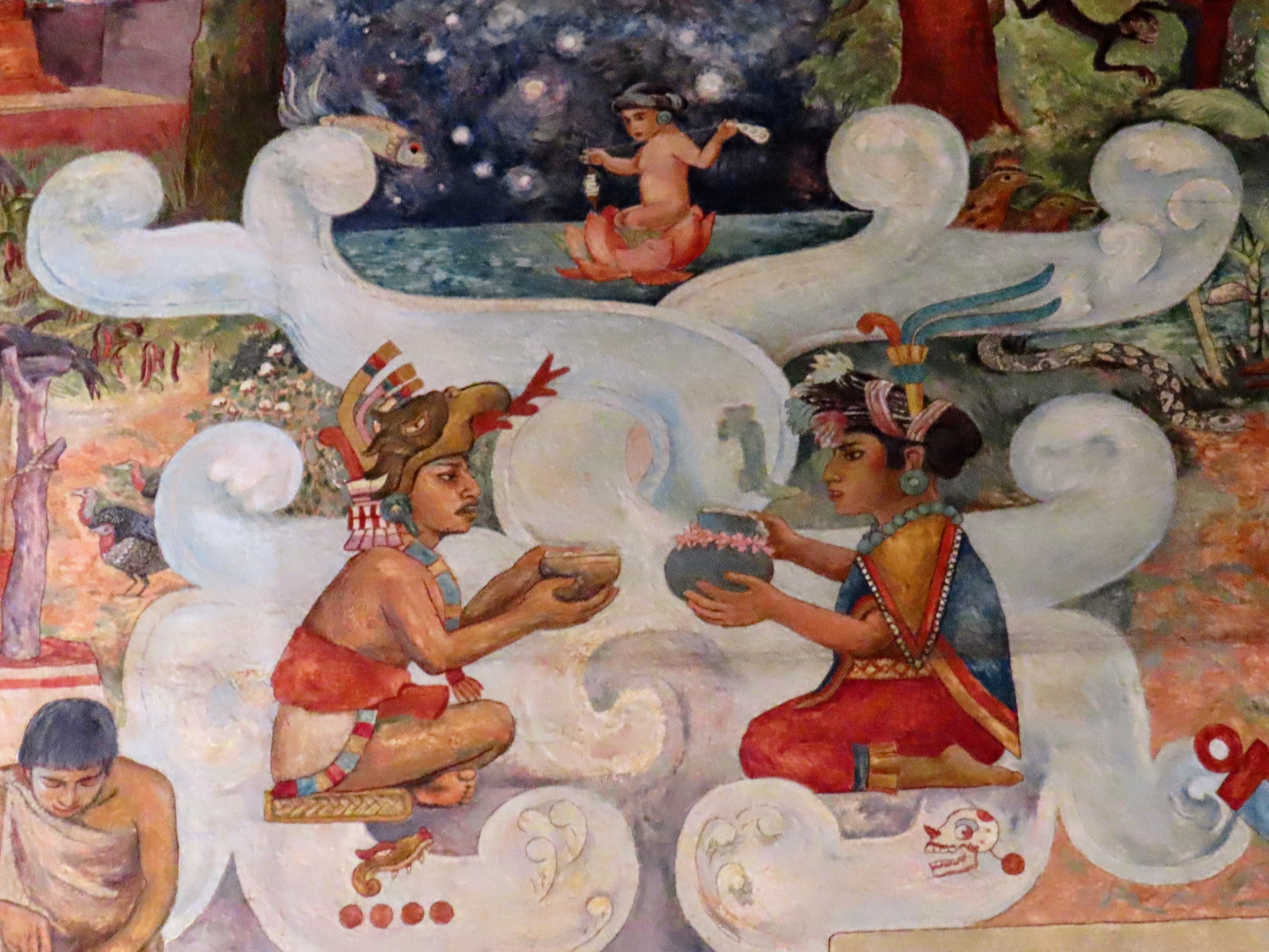
The two main figures of the Mixtec tree of life, from the mural.

The two main figures above, from the Bustos mural are also depicted in the original codex.These figures have inspired different interpretations. Some see in the two figures the story of a town being formed by an indigenous couple. Other see a wedding. Garcia Bustos identifies the scene in his biography as a wedding. The clues to the identities of the people represented lie in the glyphs below their figures, indicating their dates of birth, on the 260-day Mesoamerican calendar. The figure on the left, identified as a male by a bare chest--with an alligator icon below him and four dots, is Lord Four Alligators. The woman on the right, identified by her long hair and huipil, with the skull and one dot below her is Lady One Death. These were their actual names taken from the days they were born, just as saint days can now play a role in naming newborns. The newborn baby, born from the tree, is a key element of this codex. The child establishes the ruling line of the Mixtecs of Apoala. They extended their domain and power through marriages among leading families.

==== Dates and Names on codices ====
The 260 day Mixtec ritual calendar is similar to the Aztec calendar and other Mesoamerican calendars. In the Mixtec culture, names were taken from birth dates on the ritual calendar. We observed above that the name of Lady One Death is indicated on the mural by a skull for death and one dote for the year one. There are 20 glyphs, mostly selected from nature, like the skull, for days on codices, and used throughout Mesoamérica. And there are 13 periods of 20 days. This makes for a ritual year of 260 days. There was also a calendar of 365 days and a cycle of 52 years in Mesoamerican calendars.

==== Codex Names ====
The Vienna Codex mentioned above is also known as Codex Vindobonensis (Mexicanus 1) and of late also known as Codex Yuta Tnoho, named after its area of origin, not after Vienna where it ended up in Europe. Currently the area of Yuta Tnoho is called Santiago Apoala and it is located in the state of Oaxaca. In Mixtec mythology Yuta Tnoho is the birthplace of the Mixtec people, as we saw in the above image. The birth of the Mixtec people is captured in the original codex by a Yuta Tnoho Tree of life. The tree of life is a key element in many of the world's mythologies and the artist has made it the largest image of the prehispanic panel. Although García Bustos has not duplicated the original codex as he has in other images on the mural, instead he has given us an imaginative interpretation.

==== Apoala Today ====
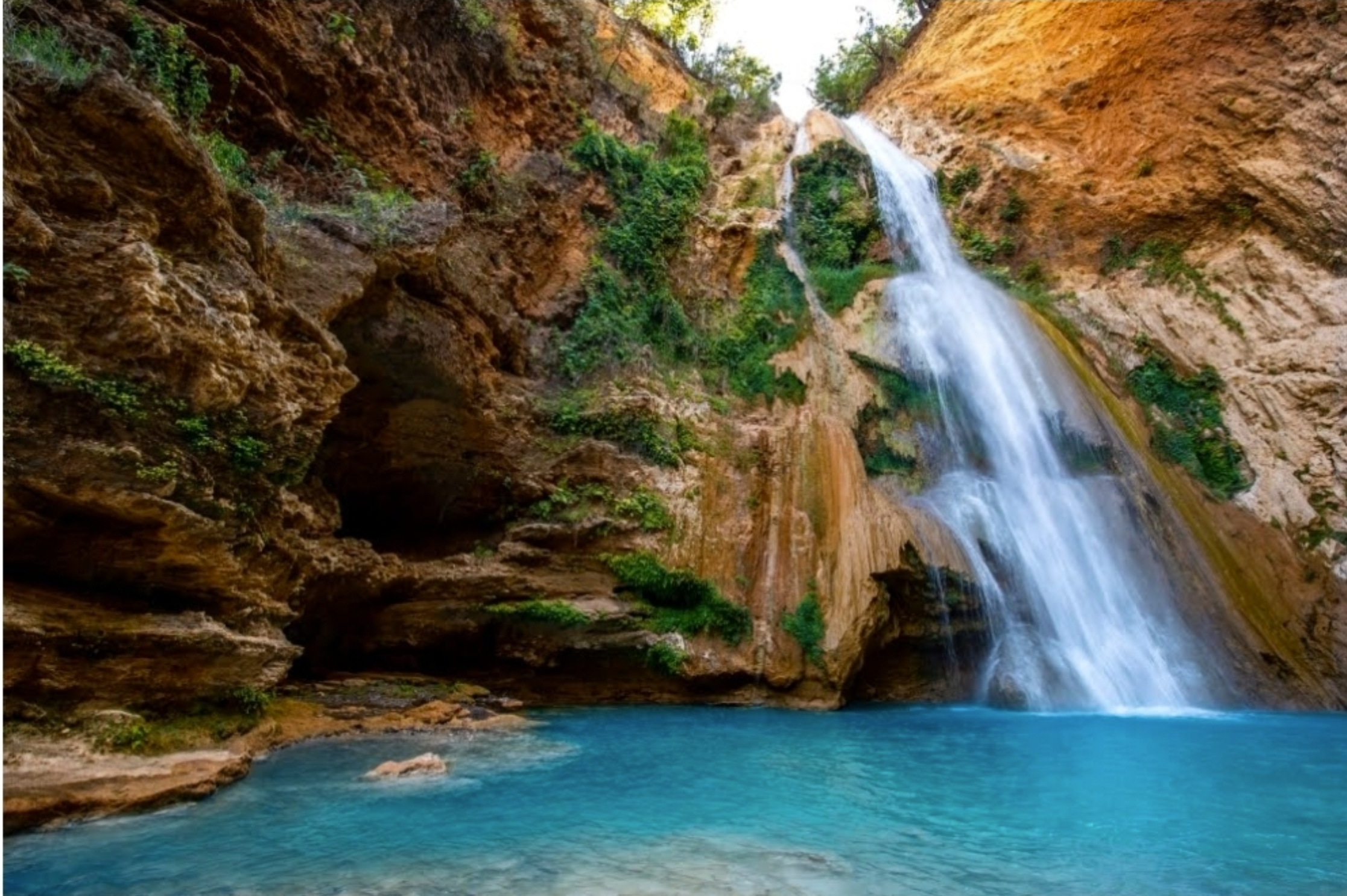
Waterfall at Santiago Apoala

When tourists visit Santiago Apoala today they can see why the beauty of the spot convinced the Mixtecs that humankind originated here. It's a Garden of Eden-like setting.

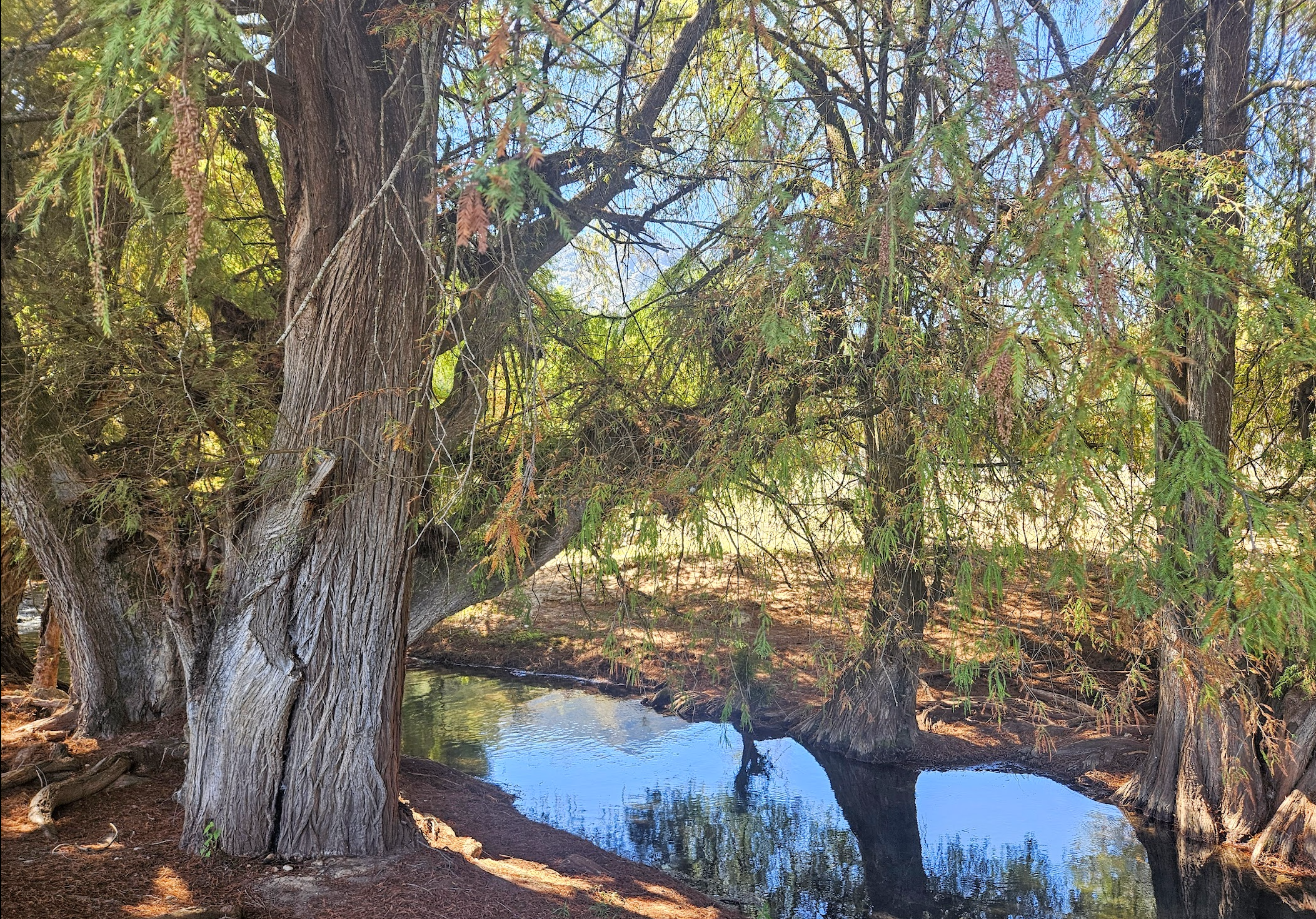
Stream at Santiago Apoala

==== Using a Codex ====
Many admire the Mixtec codices as works of art. García Bustos also shows us how they were used to educate. In the image below from the mural, a leader is pointing out the meaning of three scenes from a Codex. Viewing the three images being pointed to from bottom to top, the first image is inspired by the Yuta Tnoho Codex as are the second, discussed earlier as well as the top image of corn.

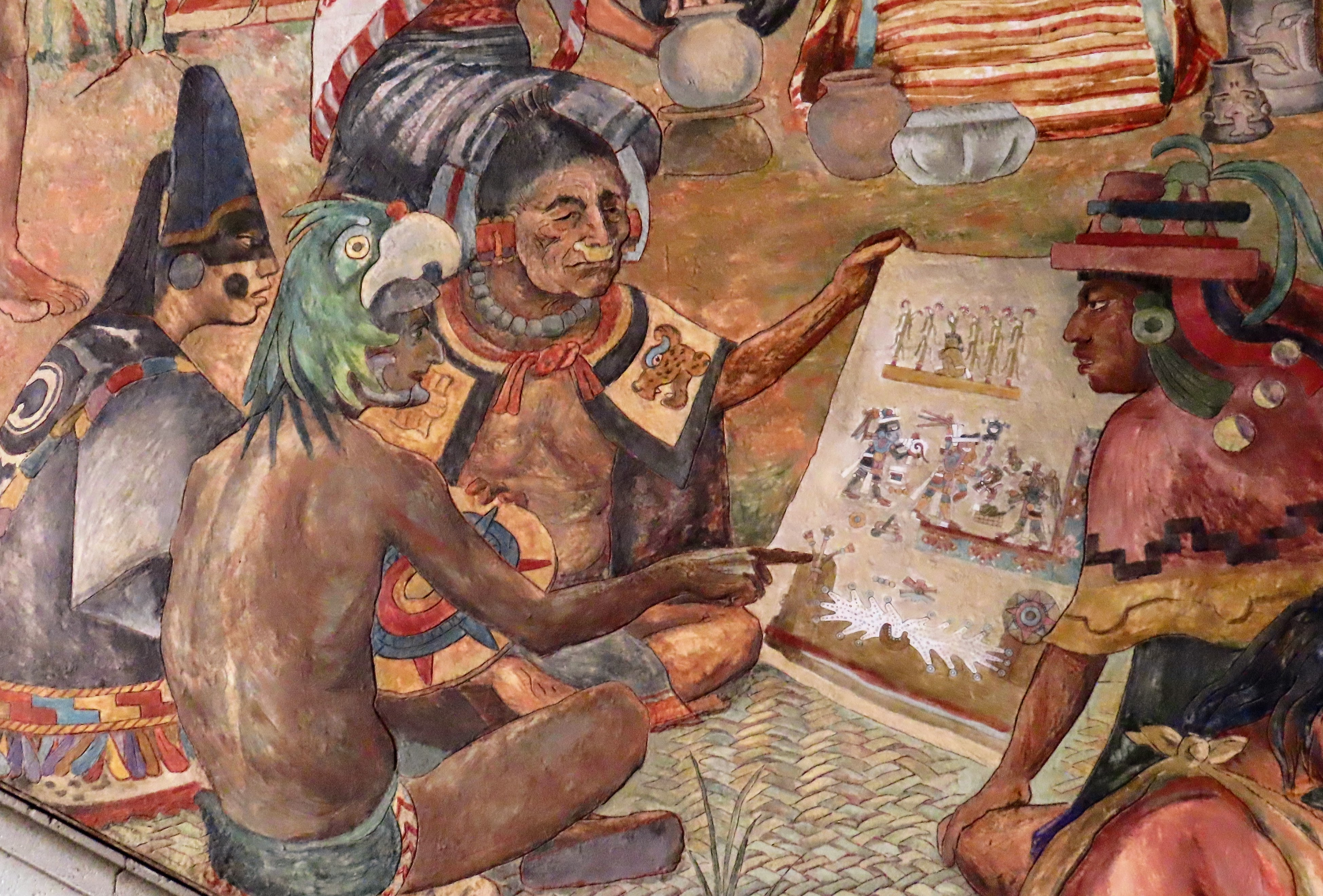
Interpreting a codex

John Pohl, an American academic, speculates that codices were portable scripts, or storyboards, for celebrating historical events. As illustrated in the mural, the codices could be displayed "while a poet recited the text to musical accompaniment, and actors in costume performed parts of the saga."

==== Arturo García Bustos as a prehispanic character ====
The two images below bear a striking resemblance-if you let your imagination wander a bit. The image on the left is Garcia Bustos taken 30+ years after he painted the mural. On the right. Is it also Garcia Bustos. He does not tell us that he pictured himself in a wizened elder on the mural. But it seems plausible. This might be one of several examples of how Arturo García Bustos added a personal touch to the mural mixed with perhaps a hint of irony, or humor.

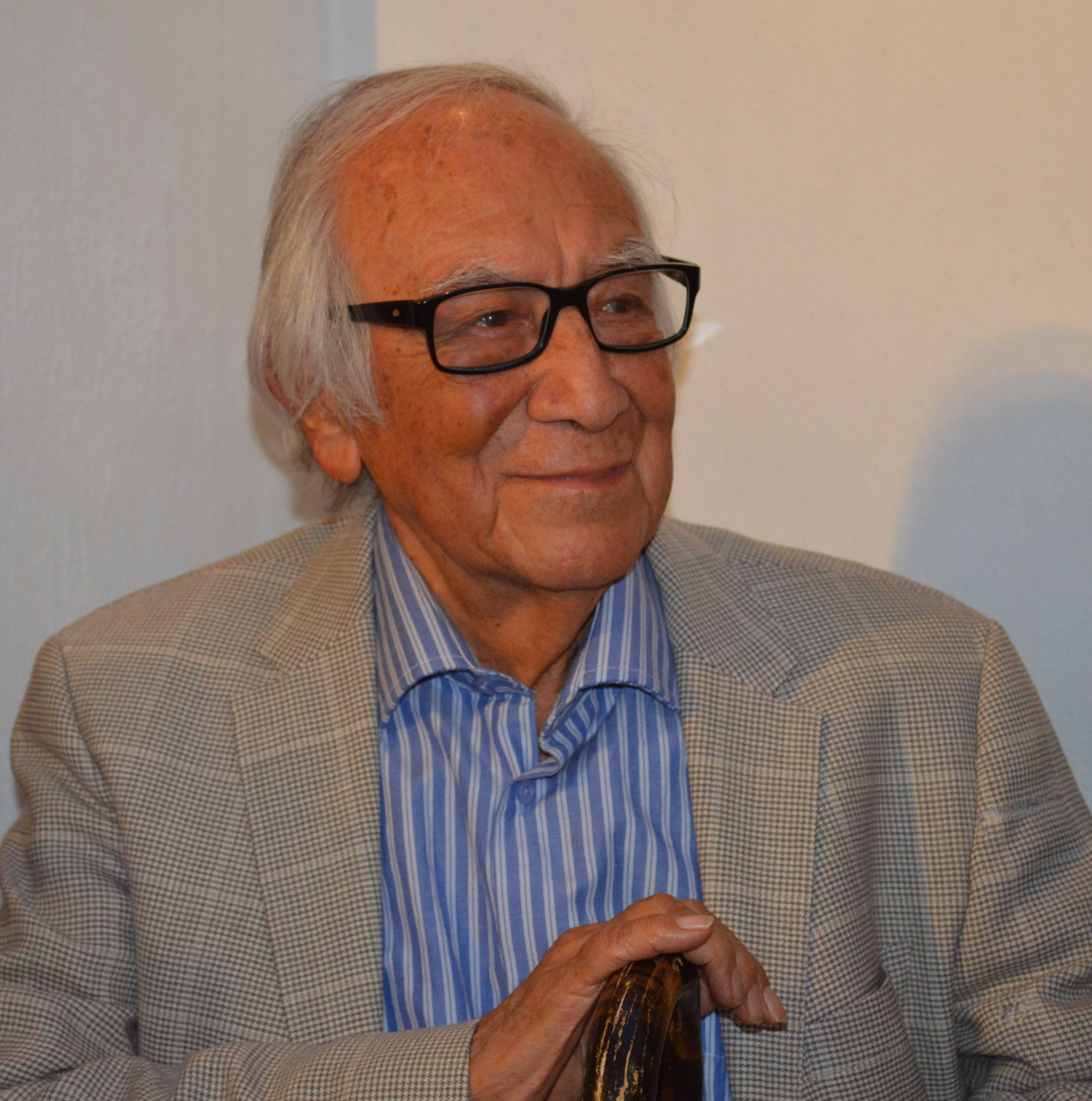
Arturo Garcia Bustos

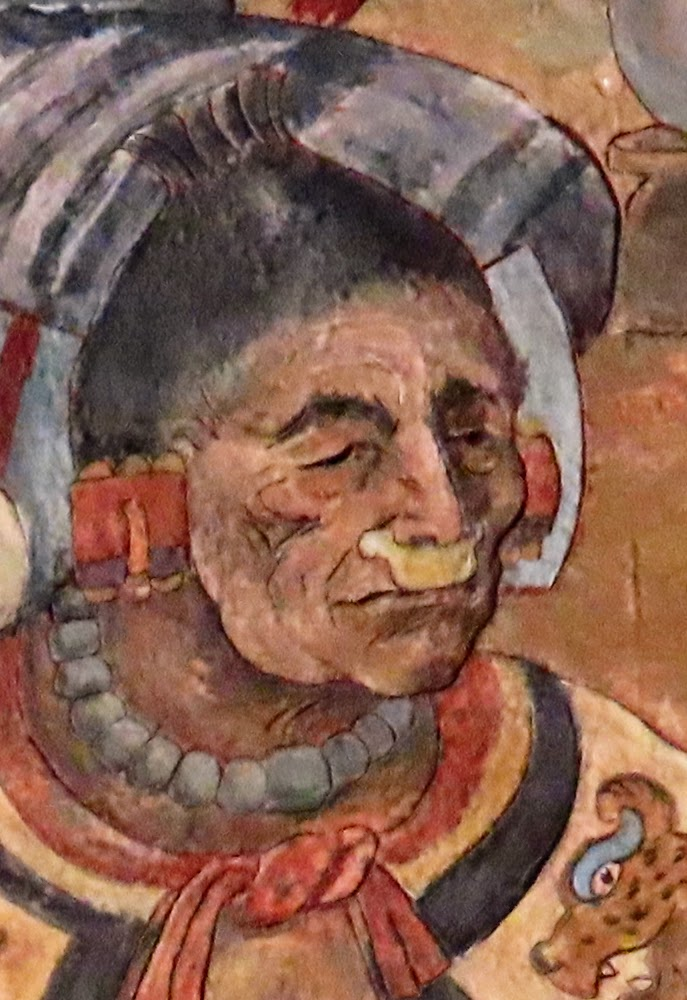
A shaman, resembling García Bustos

=== Gold ===
The mural's image of an artisan working with gold strongly resembles a gold disc that archeologists discovered in Tomb 3 at Zaachila in the state of Oaxaca. This exemplifies the realism that characterizes García Bustos' art. (He appears to have been a serious historian.) The Aztecs demanded gold as tribute after they conquered what is now Oaxaca. Similar gold disks are depicted in the Mendoza Codex, indicating gold as tribute from Oaxaca to the victors after a military victory.

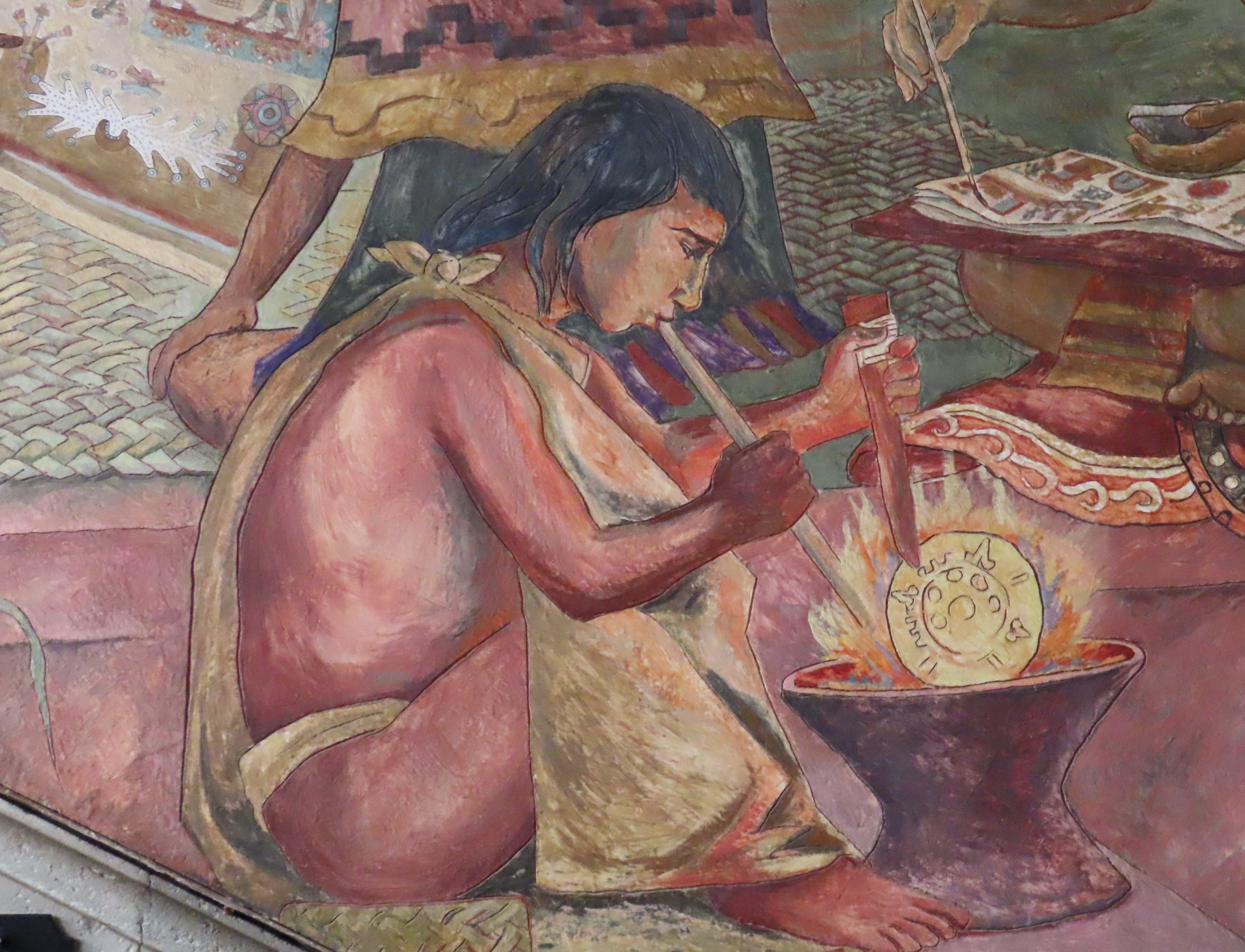
An artisan working with gold.

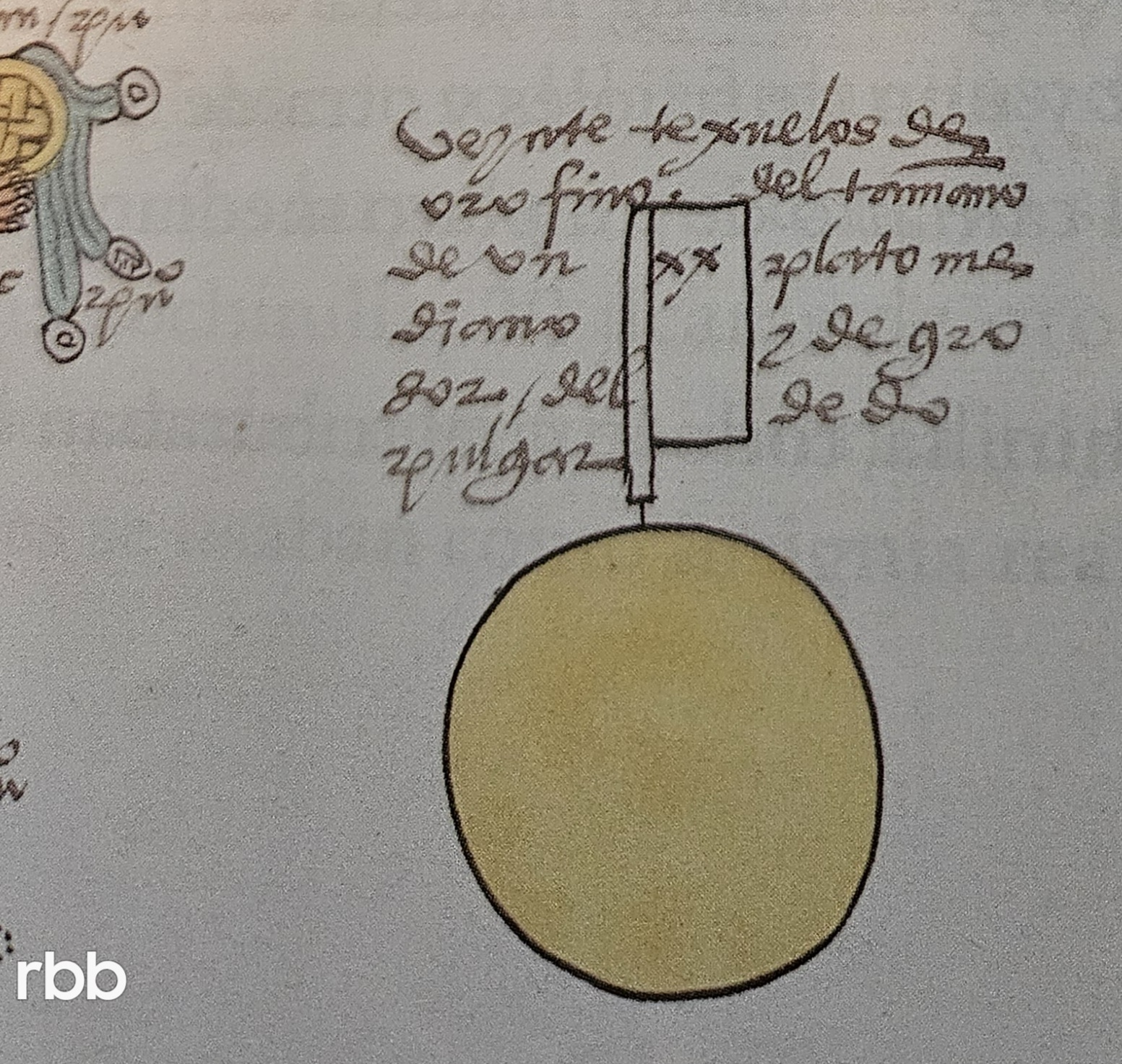
Image of an icon representing gold from the Mendoza Codex, as tribute after a military victory.

The gold rush to Oaxaca started after Montezuma told the Spanish conquistador Hernán Cortés that he obtained his gold from Oaxaca. Cortés wasted no time in sending troops to conquer Huaxyacac as the Aztecs, or more correctly the Mexicas, called the area of present-day Oaxaca. Cortez, also known as the Marquessate of the Valley of Oaxaca claimed large tracts of land around Oaxaca for himself and his ancestors. The presence of gold in the mural also highlights the motherload of gold objects discovered in 1932 in Tomb 7 at the Zapotec-Mixtec site, called Monte Albán by the Spanish. We do not know how earlier civilizations called the area but Sacred Mountain and Hill of the Jaguar have been suggested.

==== Mixtec Gold from Monte Albán ====
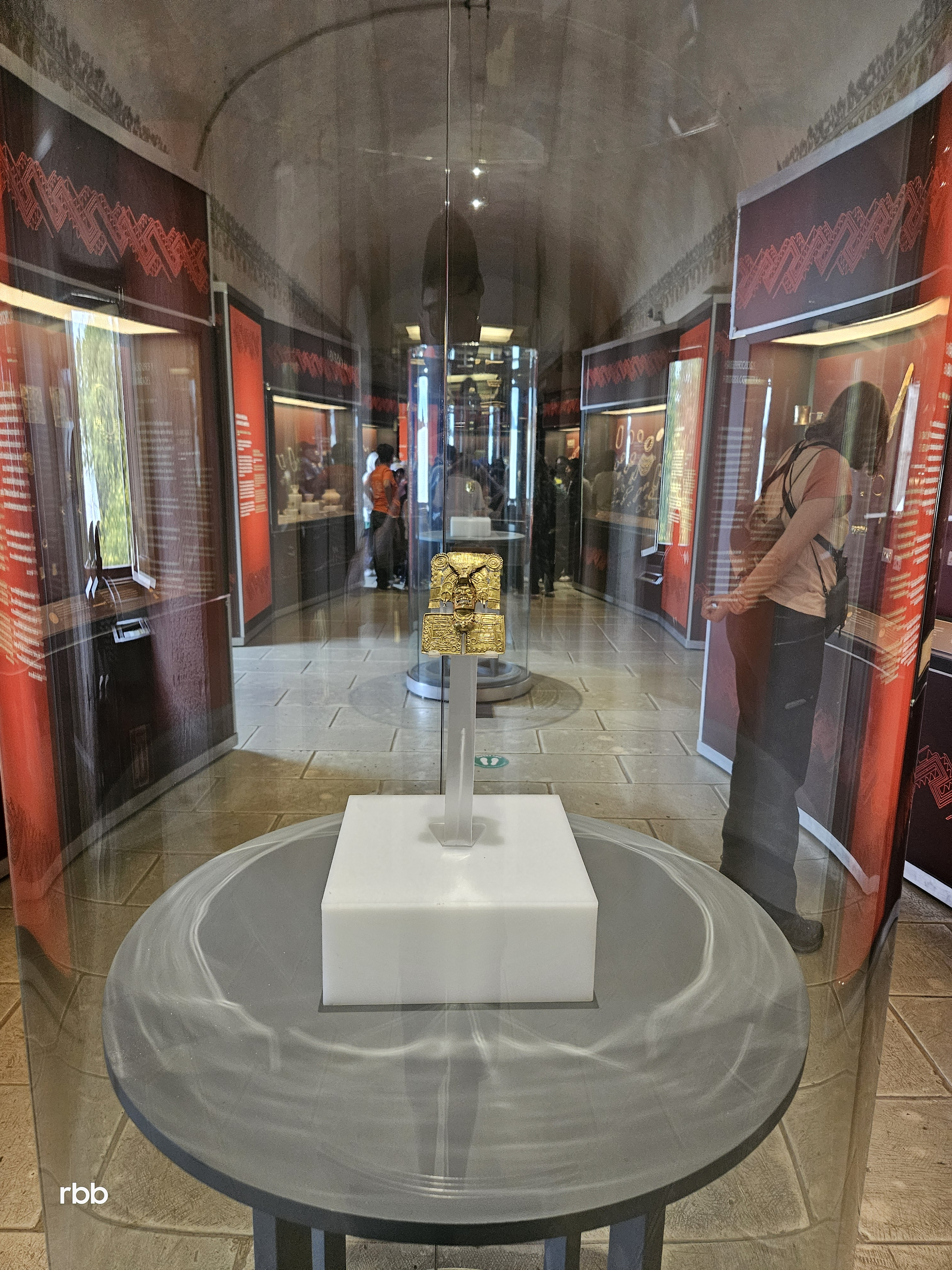
Pectoral as displayed in the museum

The pectoral pictures here, thought to be Mictlantecuhtli can be viewed in Oaxaca's Centro Cultural Santo Domingo, along with a treasure trove of rare objects from one of the richests discoveries of Mesoamerican funeral objects. It was discovered in 1932 in Tomb 7 of Monte Albán, along with over 500 other objects. By comparing the image in the display case to the close-up we can see that the pectoral, although miniature, is nevertheless detailed. The maximum width is 115 mm (4 inches) and maximum thickness 2 mm (.08 inches) And it weighs 112 grams.

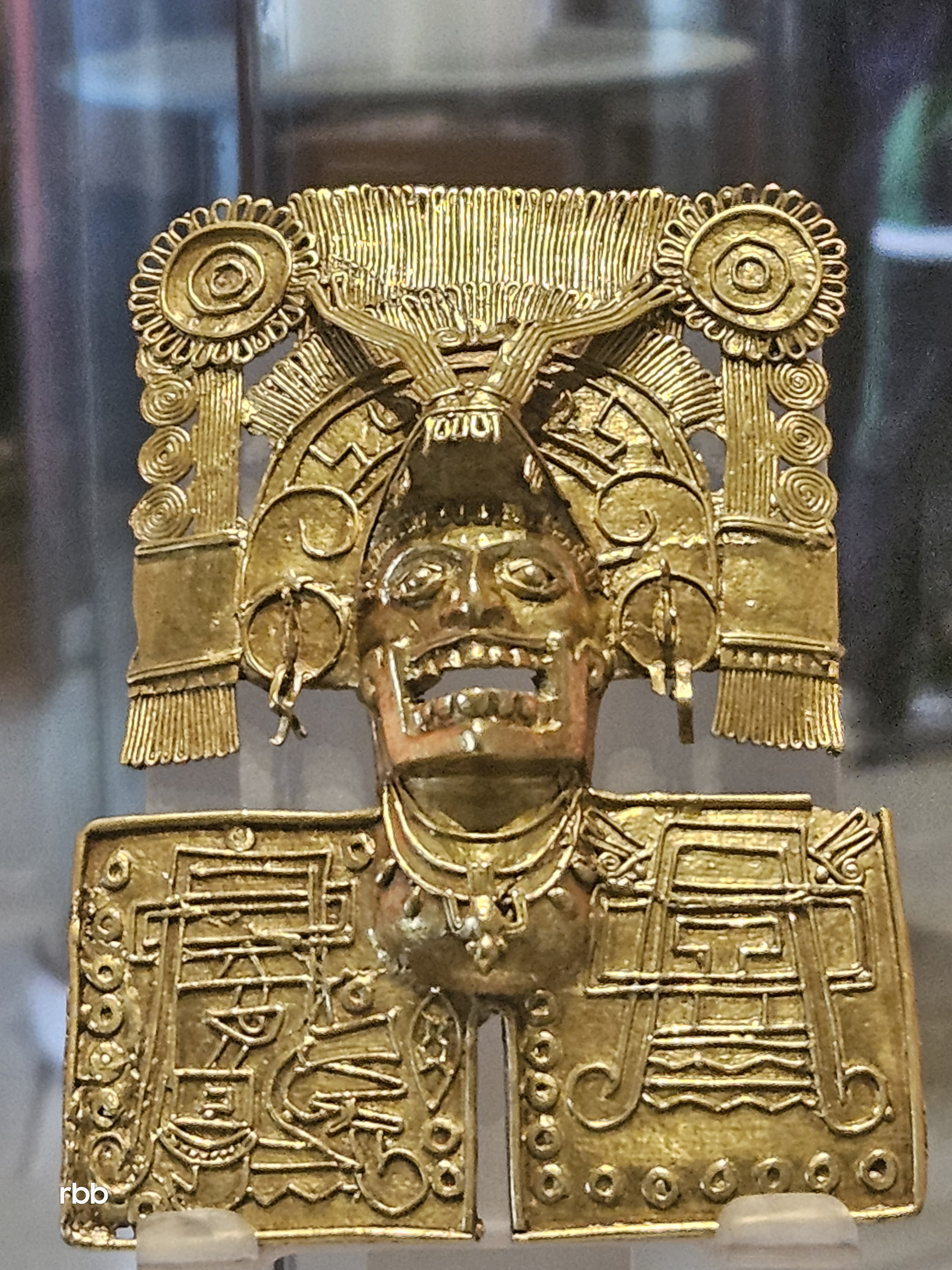
A close-up of the Pectoral from Monte Albán, depicted above

==== Tribute ====
Tribute was a key motivation for waging war in pre-hispanic times. Instead of conquering and imposing their way of life on another Mesoamerican group or community, the winners of wars exacted tribute.

Mendoza Codex

This document is named after Don Antonio de Mendoza (1495–1552), the viceroy of New Spain, who supervised its creation and who was a leading patron of native artists . The Mendoza Codex helps us to understand the tribute requirements imposed on Huaxyacac before the Conquest and Antequera after the Conquest. Folio 44R of the Codex illustrates the Huaxyacac-Antequera Tribute.

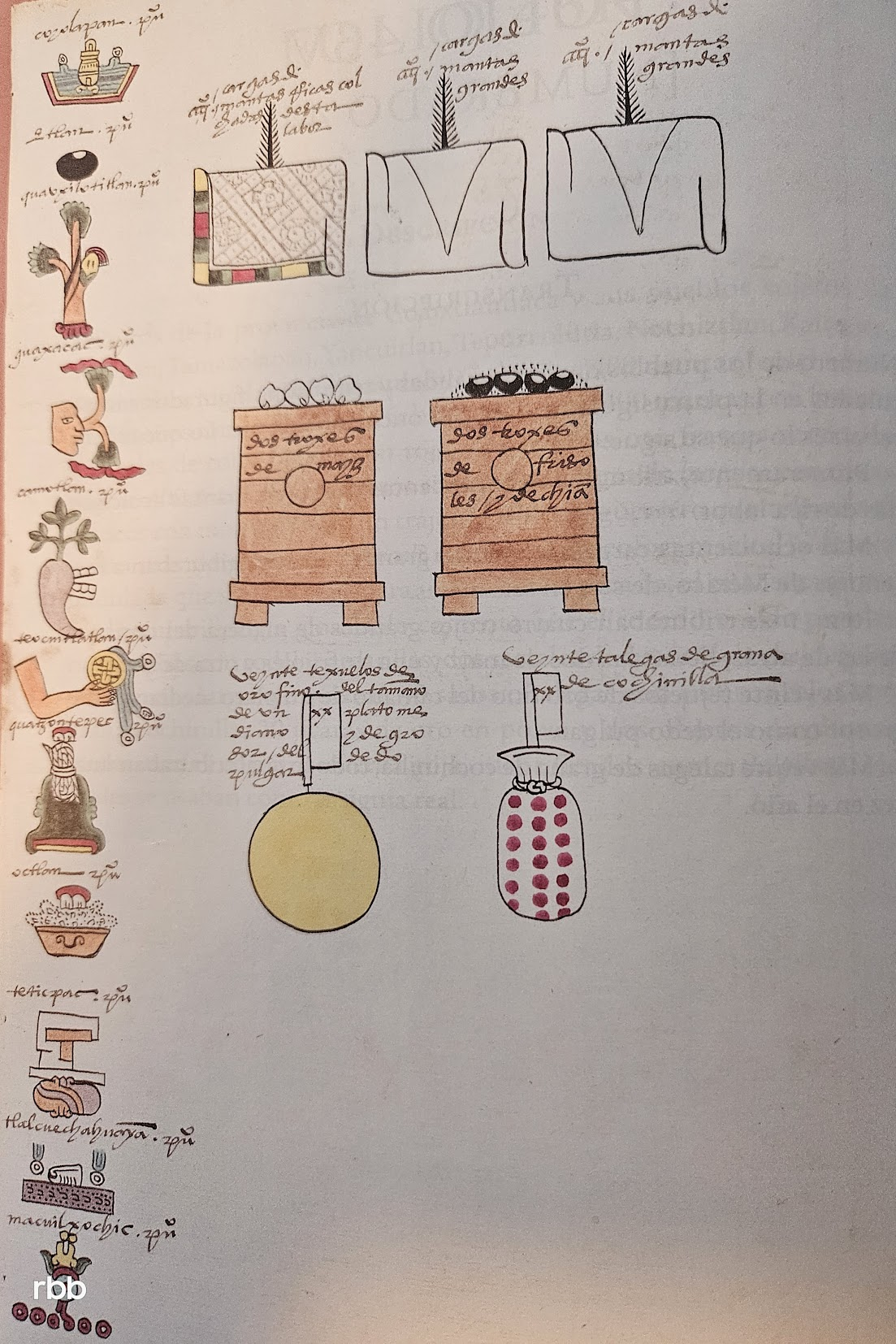
Page 44R of the Mendoza Codex

Huaxyacac on the Mendoza Codex

The Aztecs had a distinctive symbol to represent Huāxyacac (Oaxaca). It is the third glyph from the top on page 44R of the Mendoza Codex. It represents a stylized a nose (a way of saying a location) attached to a leaf of a guaje tree. In other words the icon is another way of saying place of the guaje. We see a close-up of the icon below.

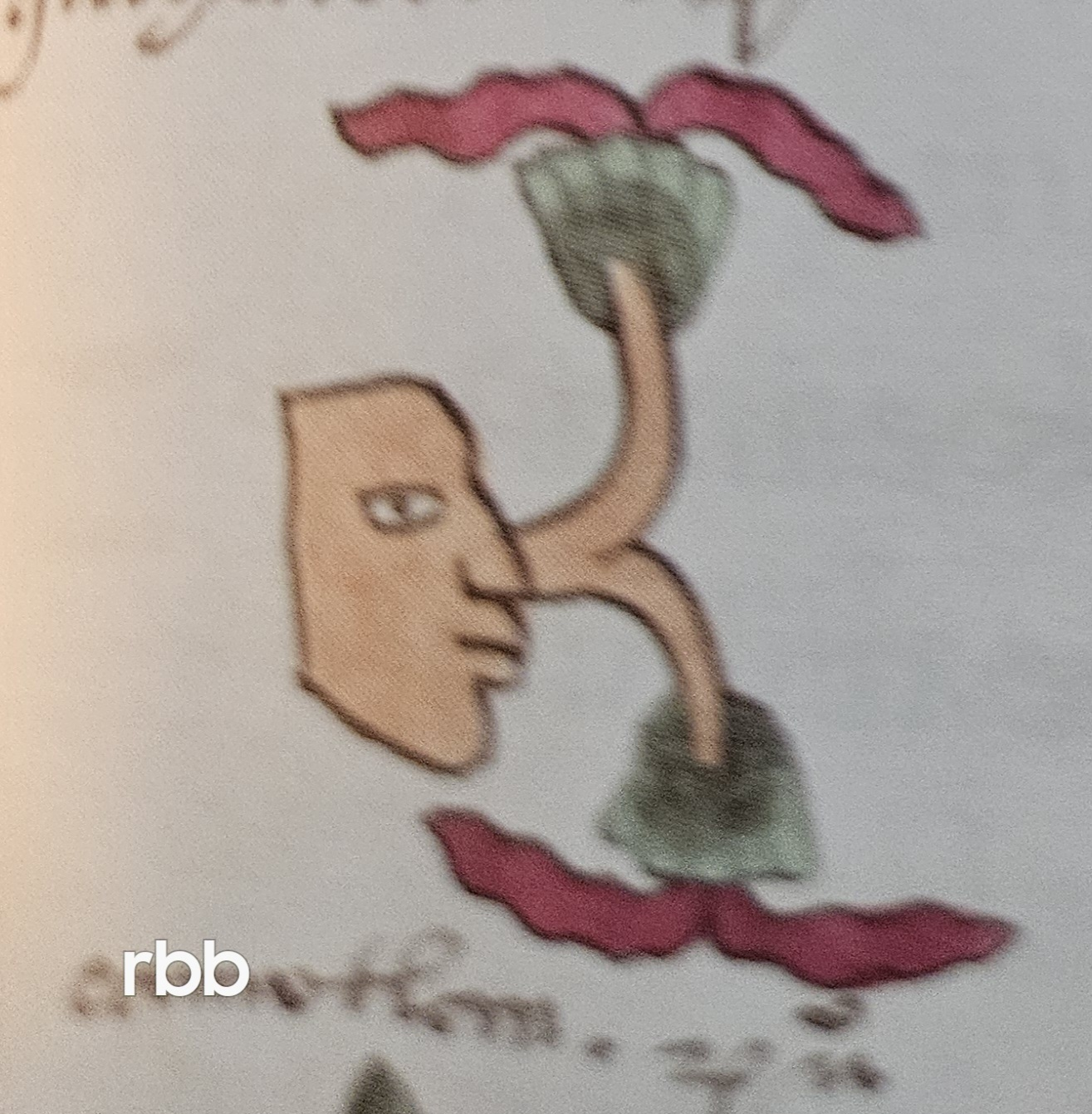
The symbol for Huaxyacac on the Mendoza Codex

Tribute being collected on the mural

The tribute collector is receiving tribute from young women. A close observation of the bowl containing tribute reveals gemstones, perhaps jade. Jade does not appear as an item for tribute from the Oaxaca area listed in the Mendoza Codex examined above. Some warriors wore jaguar costumes, like in the image, but they were not from real jaguars. This type of clothing was thought to grant the virtues of the animal from which the clothing was derived.

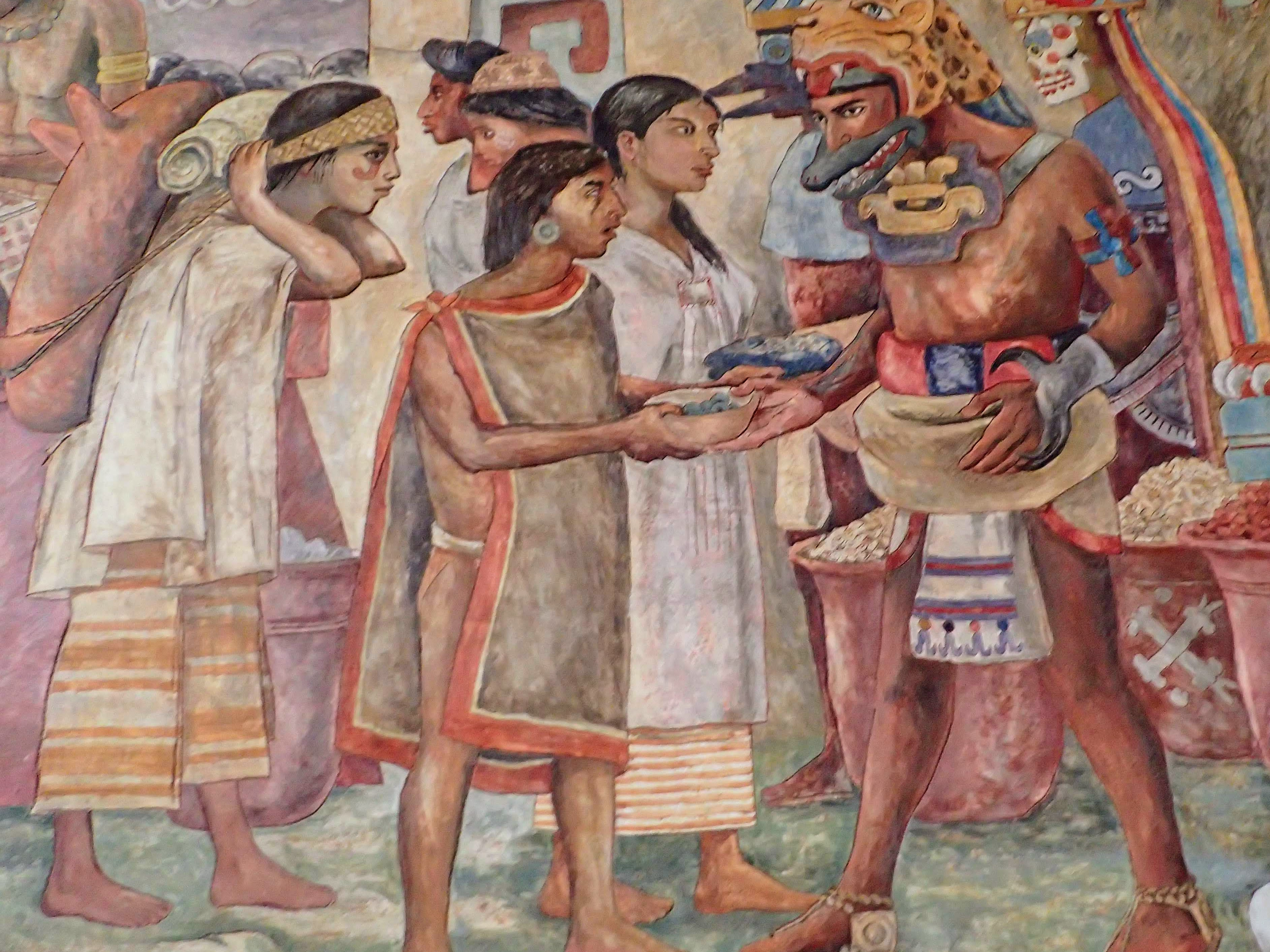
Tribute being collected, from the mural

==== Fearful young women ====
The Aztecs or more properly the Mexicas conquered Oaxaca in the 1480s They exacted tribute captured soldiers made some slaves and sacrificed some. That might account for the look of fear in the eyes of the young women in the image below. Although one resource suggests the young women are participating in an unspecified religious ceremony. All three panels include a character in the bottom right corner, these young women for example, that have preoccupations written on their faces.

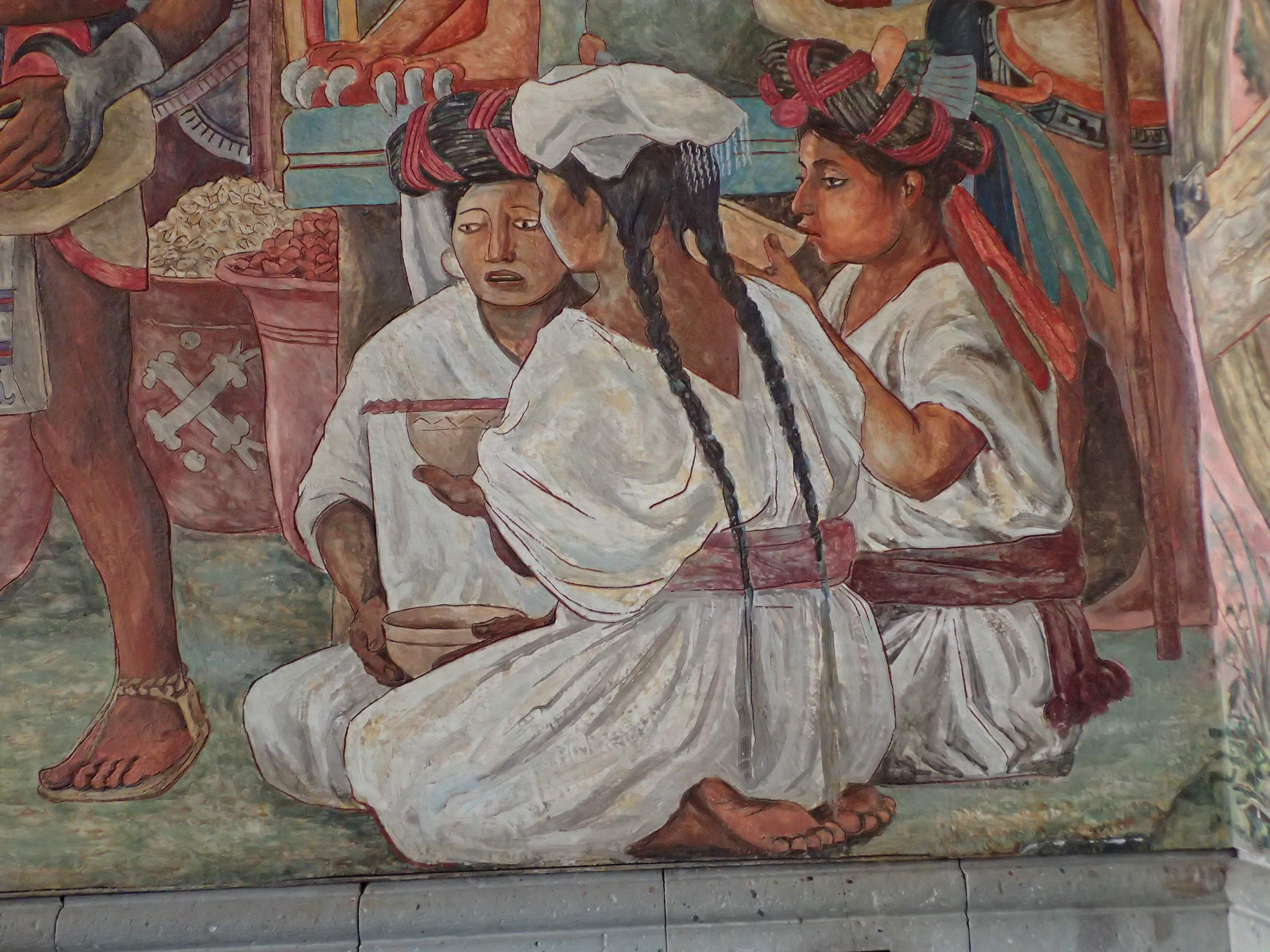
Three young, apparently concerned women from the prehispanic panel

== Colonial Panel ==
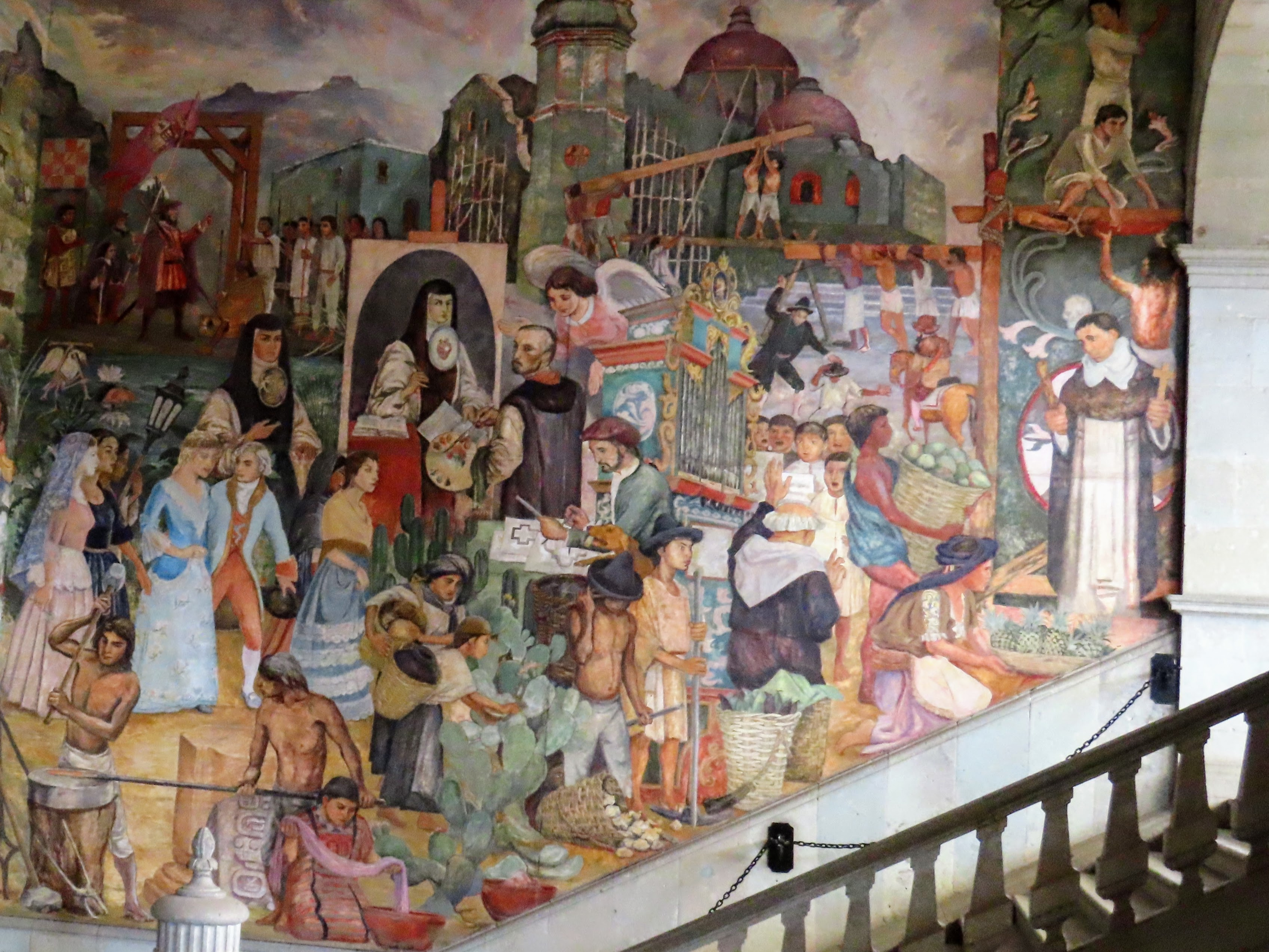
The colonial panel

The colonial panel highlights important colonial topics such as the Conquest, Princess Donají, church construction, mistreatment of indigenous people, Sor Juana de la Cruz, Miguel Cabrera, Manuel Fernández Fiallo, cochineal, church music and organs, craftsmen as well as Spanish colonizers. This panel also contains information about glyphs at Monte Albán that are considered an early form of writing. The panel covers 300 years, when the Spanish ruled New Spain, starting with Spanish soldiers or Conquistadors They were soldiers of fortune, meaning they received land and gold as compensation for their services, rather than a salary.

=== The Conquest in Oaxaca (Huaxyacac) ===
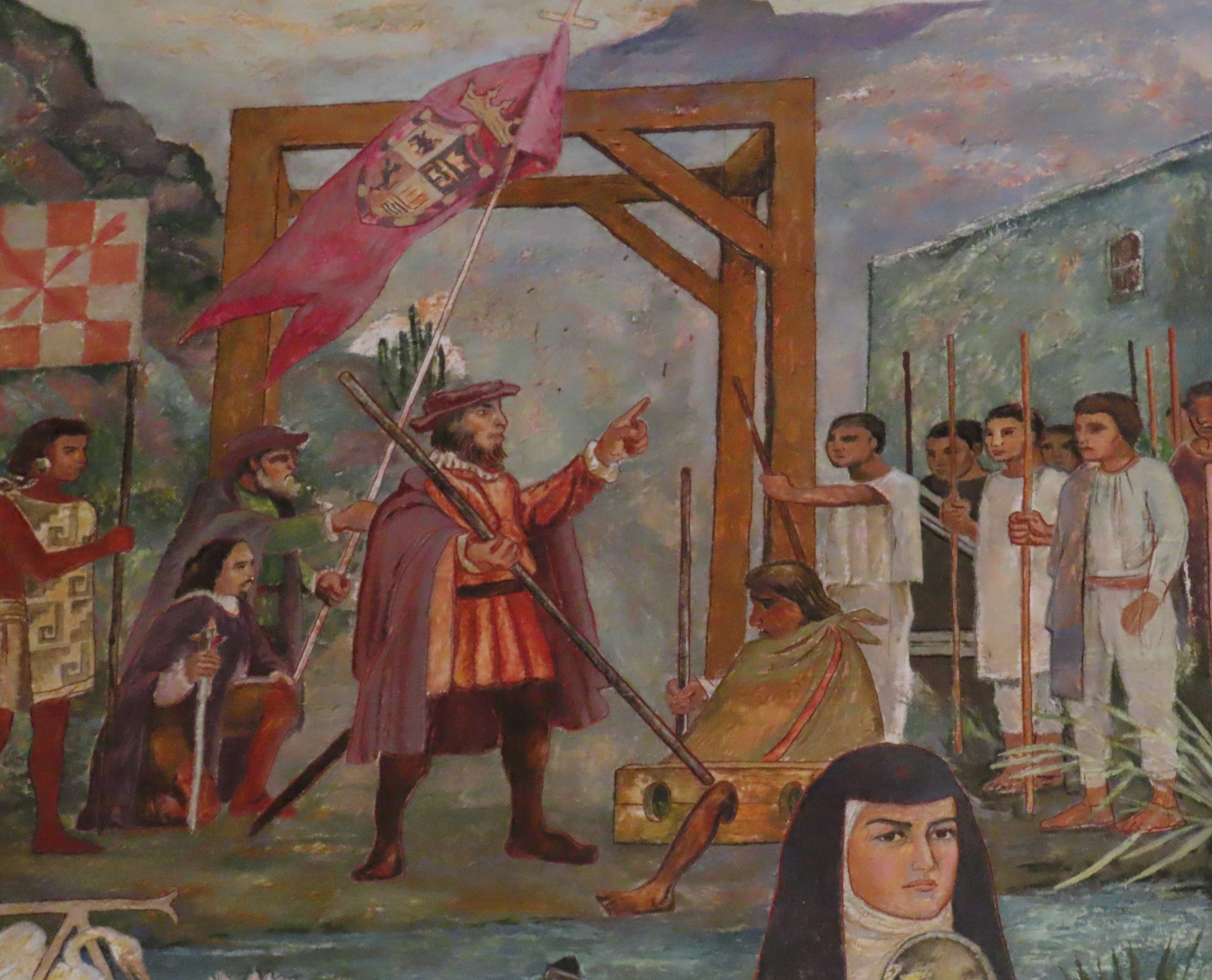
Francisco de Orozco arriving in Oaxaca, 1521

In the image above, the Spanish leader stands below a gallows type structure, possibly used for public hangings. The Spanish invaders have swords and long poles. The indigenous people, dressed in white, have only poles. An indigenous person is held in the stock while the Spaniard appears to be poking him. The white clothing of the indigenous people reflect the restrictions that the Spanish rulers placed on clothing, at a later date.

These figures represent the initial conflict of the Spaniards with the indigenous peoples of Oaxaca, including Amuzgos, Mixtecs, Nahuas, Triquis, Zapotecos and more. In November 1521, just three months after conquering Tenochtitlán, (Mexico City), Hernán Cortés sent Francisco de Orozco and 400 Aztec warriors to take Huaxyacac. They travelled over 400 kilometers from Tenochtitlán (Mexico City). Hernán Cortés never visited the area of Oaxaca, although he was granted 23,000 vassals and properties of more than 11,500 km^{2}. Spanish administrators and settlers took the land from established people and also demanded tribute. Cortés also claimed the land where Oaxaca stands today but the residents objected and in the end the King of Spain agreed with them.

A tightly packed group of people, such as García Bustos depicts is a common feature of Mexican muralists, like Diego Rivera. This reflects the Marxist view of history, that events are shaped by a struggle between a large group of the under-privileged class, against a small group of the privileged class that is holding power.

The Spanish established the community called Antequera in 1529. After the War of Independence (1810–21), when Mexico became an independent country, Antequera was renamed Oaxaca, sometimes after independence spelled Guajaca or Huaxaca. Since the death of President Benito Juárez in 1872, the city has been called Oaxaca de Juárez.

==== Disease conquered Oaxaca and Mesoamerica ====
The Conquest brought new diseases to Mesoamerica. Childhood diseases" like measles and mumps were not present n Mesoamerica before the Conquest, so indigenous people were not saved by "herd immunity." On the other hand, the invaders had built up resistance to diseases like smallpox, typhus as well as others and therefore Cortes and his men were not normally infected while the diseases raged among the Indigenous population.

In all of New Spain, an estimated population of twenty million, declined to two million over a period of 100 years—representing a horrendous 90% of the population. Epidemics started with smallpox in 1520 and continued for decades and. In waves of illness, Mesoamericans died of smallpox, typhus, influenza, measles, bubonic plague, cholera, malaria, tuberculosis, mumps, yellow fever, pertussis. and cocoliztli. Records indicate that the Oaxaca area suffered 19 epidemics.

Twelve kilometers from Oaxaca, in Cuilápam, in 1526 population totaled 13,000; and in 1570 6,000 and in 1584 only 2,500.

Cocoliztli (Nahuatl for "pest") caused epidemics in 1545 and 1576 appears to have been transmitted by rodent hosts and aggravated by the worst drought in five hundred years. For the natives, poor living conditions and harsh treatment under the encomiendo system left people increasingly vulnerable to the waves of disease.

The impact of losing 80-90 percent of your population is beyond imagination. Leadership annihilated. Economy destroyed. Religion, communities and families obliterated. In addition, after looting the Mesoamerican treasures, the Spaniards imposed Christianity, European values and laws, as well as a capitalist economy, designed to benefit the conquerors. And thus, the conquerors undermined the foundations of the Mesoamerican way of life. Nevertheless even today many Mexicans are connected to their indigenous roots through their languages, food and festivals and other cultural expressions.

=== Donají ===
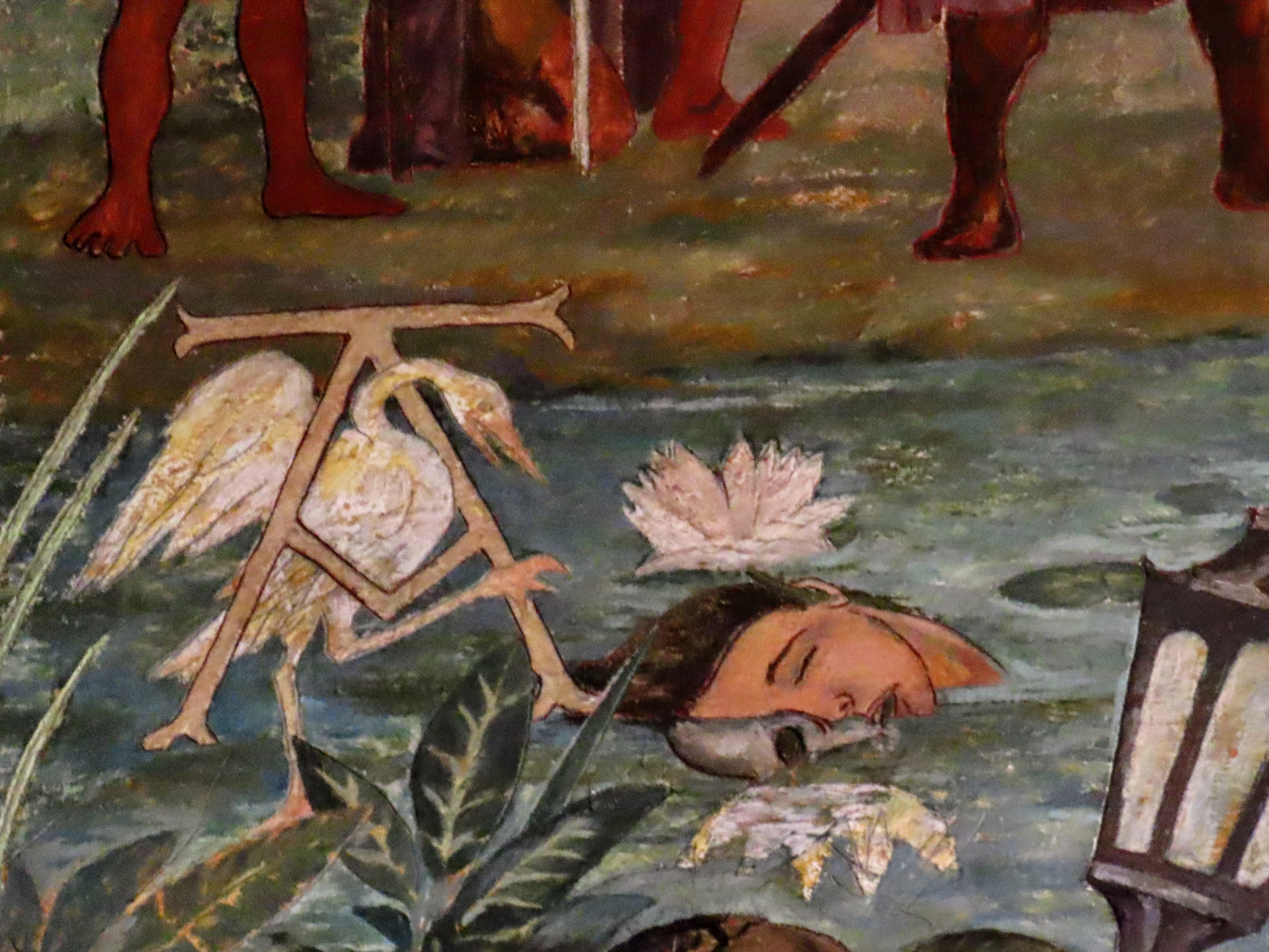
The floating head of Donají

Desperate times spun tragic stories. One of these is the legend of Donají, a tragic love story, combined with patriotism. The image above shows the floating head of Donají on the mural. She was a Zapotec princess but fell in love with Nucano, a Mixtec prince. The Zapotec and the Mixtecs were often at war. Donají committed a treasonous act that led to a Zapotec military victory over the Mixtecs. As a result, the Mixtecs murdered her and threw her body into the Atoyac river where her head was found by a shepherd boy, years later, after the Conquest. It was in perfect condition, according to the legend.

Donají head is also used as a logo for the city of Oaxaca and the legend of Donají has had top billing in the annual Oaxacan dance festival called the Guelaguetza.

Logo of the City of Oaxaca with the head of Donají

=== Construction ===
Workmen of various skin colors are pictured below constructing huge buildings in Antequera. The artist has chosen to represent the beginning of construction as closely representing the finished church, whereas the churches, especially the Cathedral, which is probably what we see on the mural, started as one-story adobe buildings, probably with a thatched roof. Eventually in response to damage from earthquakes, a style developed that is elegantly baroque and at the same time very solid .

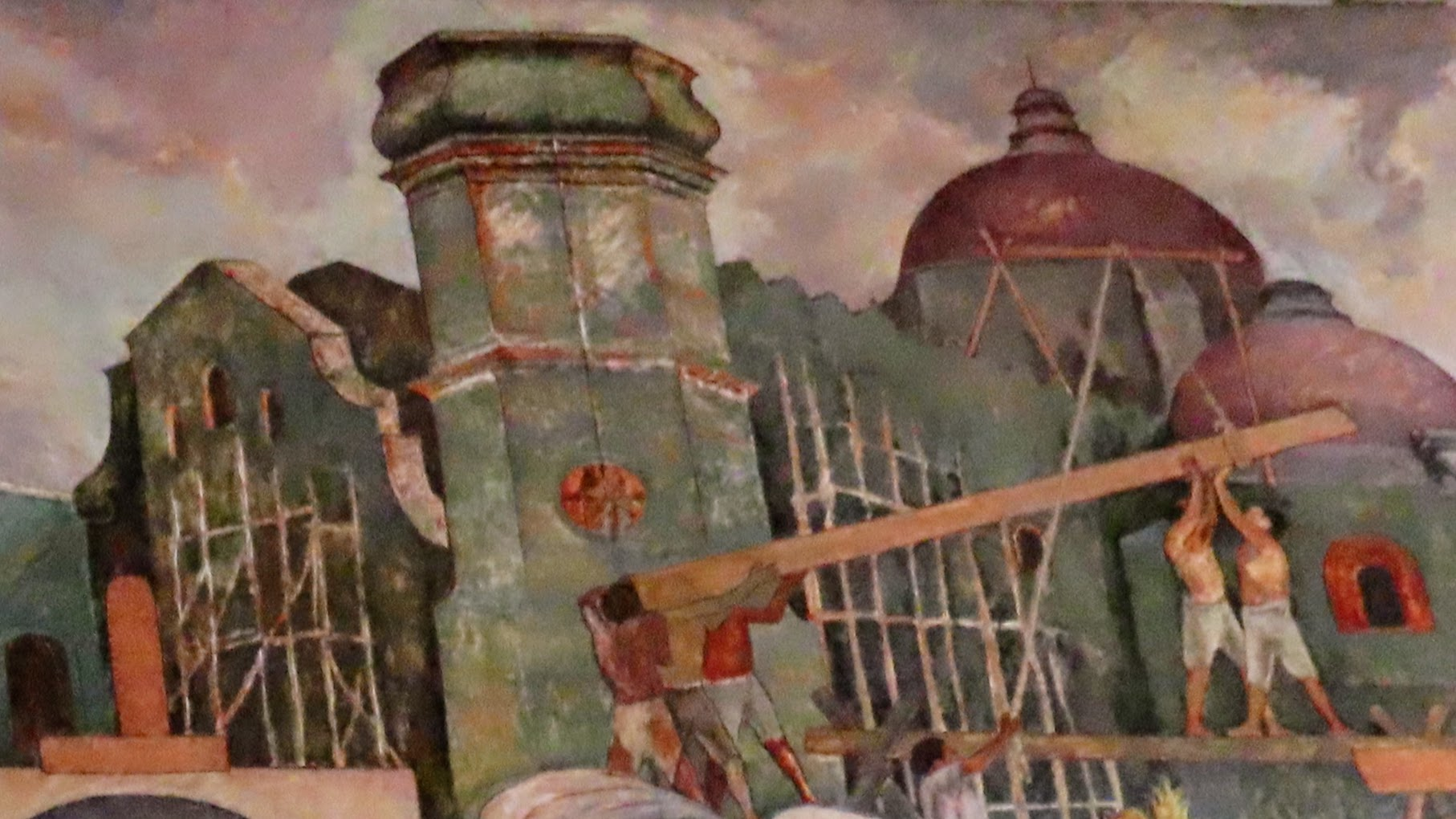
Workmen of various skin colors constructing huge buildings in Oaxaca

During the colonial period, laborers like those you see above built over two dozen colonial churches and convents in el centro of Antequera. The first step in a new construction was authorization from colonial authorities. An order of 1535 mandated, "the indigenous of the city of Antequera and towns of the bishopric of Oaxaca, will help to build the churches" so general labor was free, although craftsmen such as masons, were paid, and working conditions and wages improved under the repartimiento system. Building churches was a lengthy process. Starting in 1535, it took 26 years to construct the stonework of the Cathedral of Oaxaca. After earthquakes and rebuilding, the Cathedral was finally consecrated on 12 July 1733, almost 200 years after the project started. Researchers have studied many aspects of churches of the State of Oaxaca include the santos in the 16th-century Dominican churches of Oaxaca, Mexico.

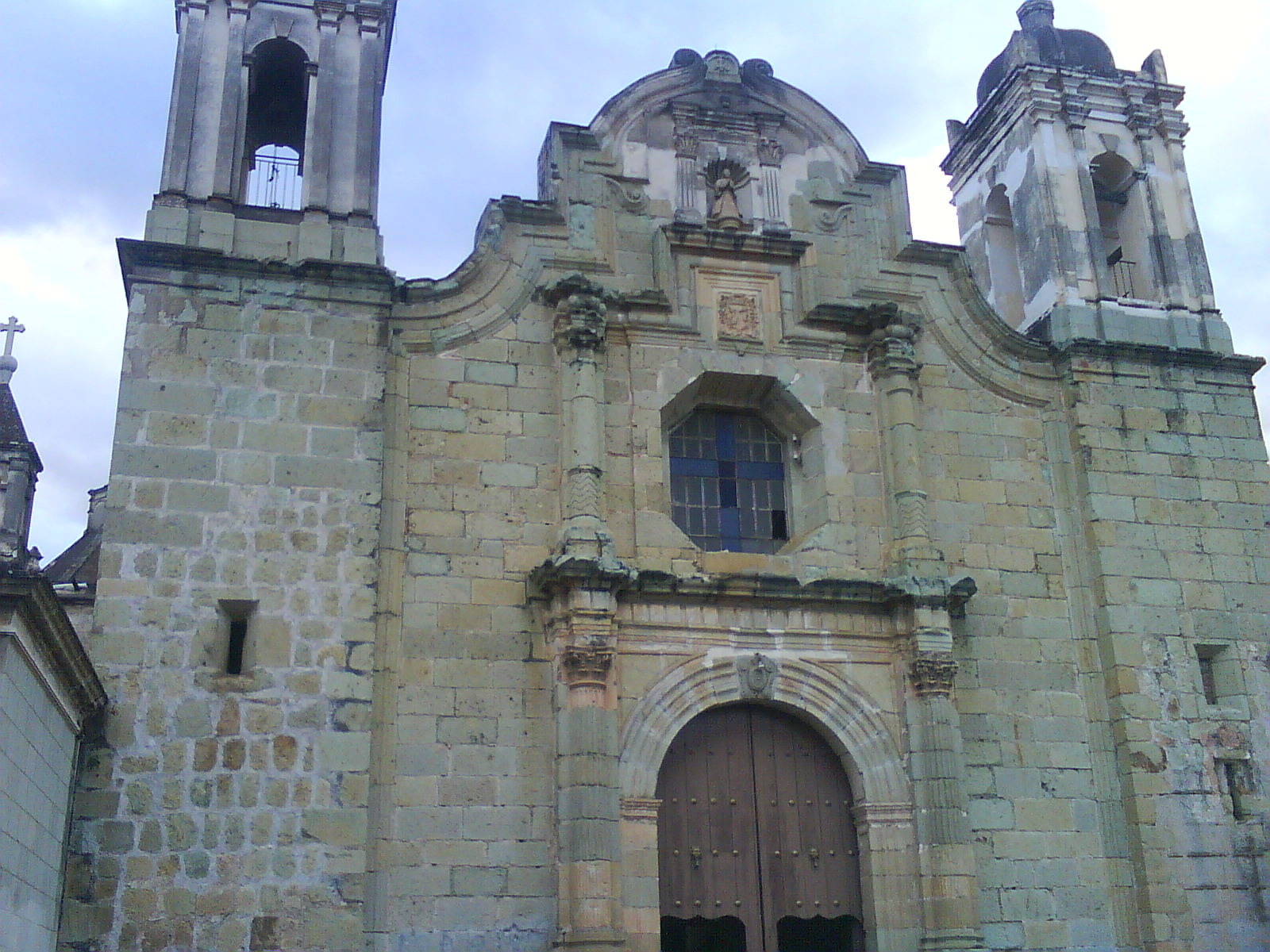
Templo de las Nieves, Oaxaca

The church pictured in the mural is said by some to be the Templo de San Juan de Dios. It also resembles the Templo de las Nieves. the Templo de San Juan de Dios is located where the first mass was held in Oaxaca, originally by the edge of the Atoyac River. The river was moved out of the central area of the city in the Colonial period. It is said that in 1561 the Viceroy Mendoza saw a painting of the river close to buildings and he gave instructions that the river be diverted (300 "brazas) south, to avoid flooding. He ordered over 300 indigenous workers to do this from specific villages. Indigenous workers were to be fed and provided with tools and treated fairly. This later provision was probably an indication of prior mistreatment, elaborated below.

=== Mistreatment of Indigenous People in Antequera ===
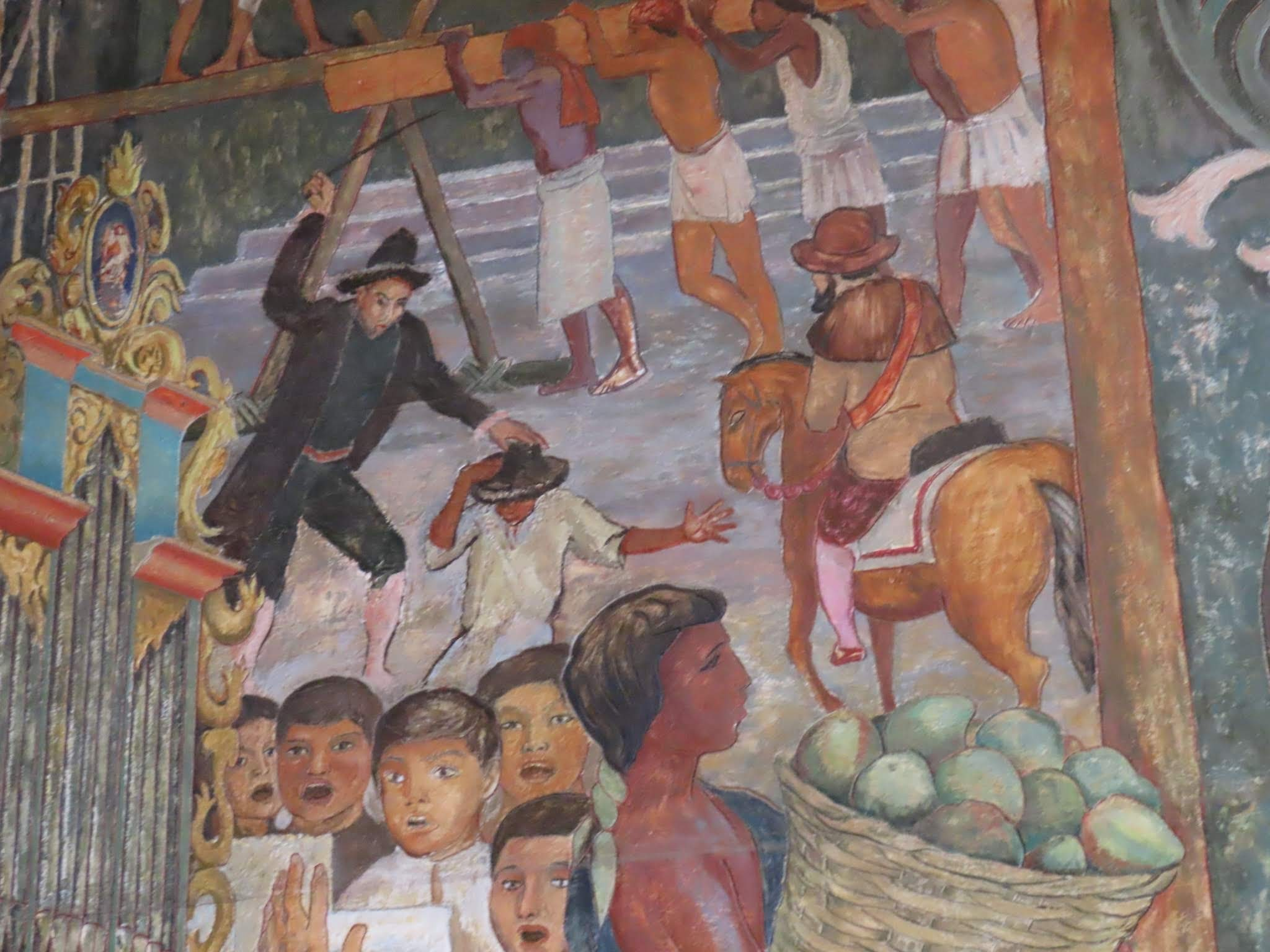
An indigenous person being beaten while a Spaniard watches

In the image on the top left corner of the colonial panel we see the mistreatment of an indigenous person by a man in black, watched by a Spaniard on horseback. Stories abound of the cruelty of the Spanish colonizers towards the original inhabitants of Antequera. The most egregious case starts with the first governor of Antequera, in 1529 with Juan Peláez de Barrio. In a year and a half in office he set a standard for corruption and immorality that would be hard to duplicate, even in a lifetime. He specialized in throwing natives to the dogs. He had a penchant for acquiring slaves, branding them on the face and selling them. By one estimate he branded 600 indigenous slaves.

Native Oaxacans were also punished for noncompliance with Church practices started in 1522 with a conviction for bigamy, a common practice before the conquest. The administration punishing Oaxacan Indigenous religious leaders goes back to 1555 when the Viceroy sentenced King Cosijopií of Tehuantepec to life imprisonment and confiscated his property. Around the same time, the bishop of Albuquerque sent Indigenous priests in Mitla and San Juan Teitipac to be burned at the stake.

Coercion in Oaxaca got more teeth when, in 1702, Bishop Maldonado of Oaxaca built a jail (Cárcel Perpetua) for the long-term imprisonment of Indigenous people illegally practicing their faith. (The jail was located on the North side of Parque Llano, a two-minute walk from the Oaxaca Lending Library.) One of the primary offenses of inmates was using the 260-day ritual calendar that we examined earlier. The catholic church called this idolatry.

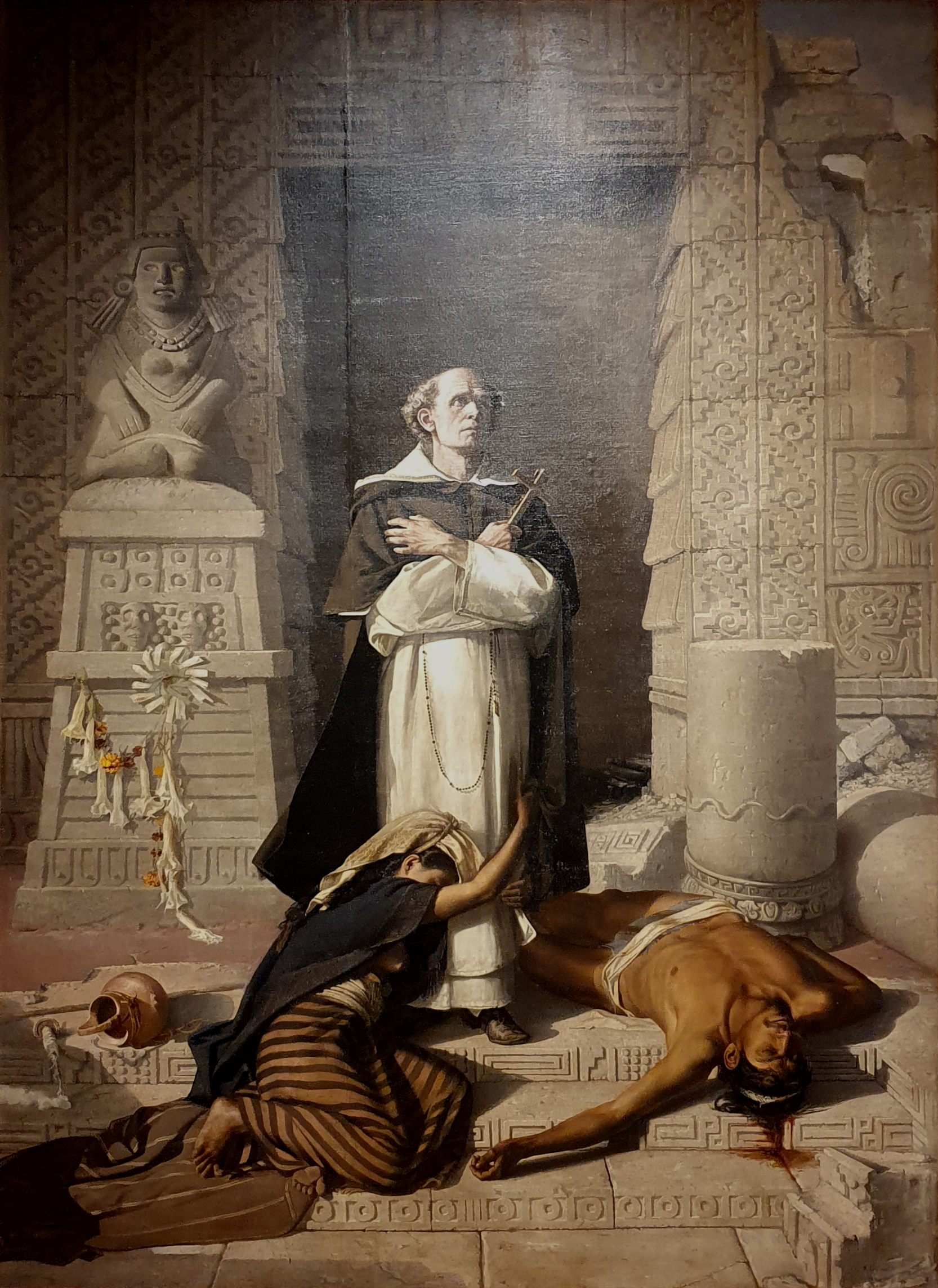
'Fray Bartolomé de las Casas' (1875) by Félix Parra - Museo Nacional de Artes)

Opposition to the abuses of conversion and coercion was quick in coming. In 1516, Bartolomé de las Casas, after reporting to authorities the abuse of indigenous people, was appointed Protector of the Indians. In 1536, de las Casas participated in a debate in Oaxaca. One wonders if the debate and the visit of the Protector of the Indians were related to the shenanigans of Hernán Cortés and Juan Peláez de Barrio that we learned about earlier. De las Casas also published a report in 1542, spelling out the mistreatment of natives by the conquerors. His account was partially responsible for the passage of the New Laws of 1542, which abolished native slavery. The New Laws also ended the serfdom of individuals upon the death of their master. However, the Viceroy of New Spain, Mendoza, did not apply the revised laws. So, in Oaxaca, serfdom was a lifetime sentence for the vassal’s entire family, at least for some.

=== Sor Juana Inés de la Cruz and Miguel Cabrera ===
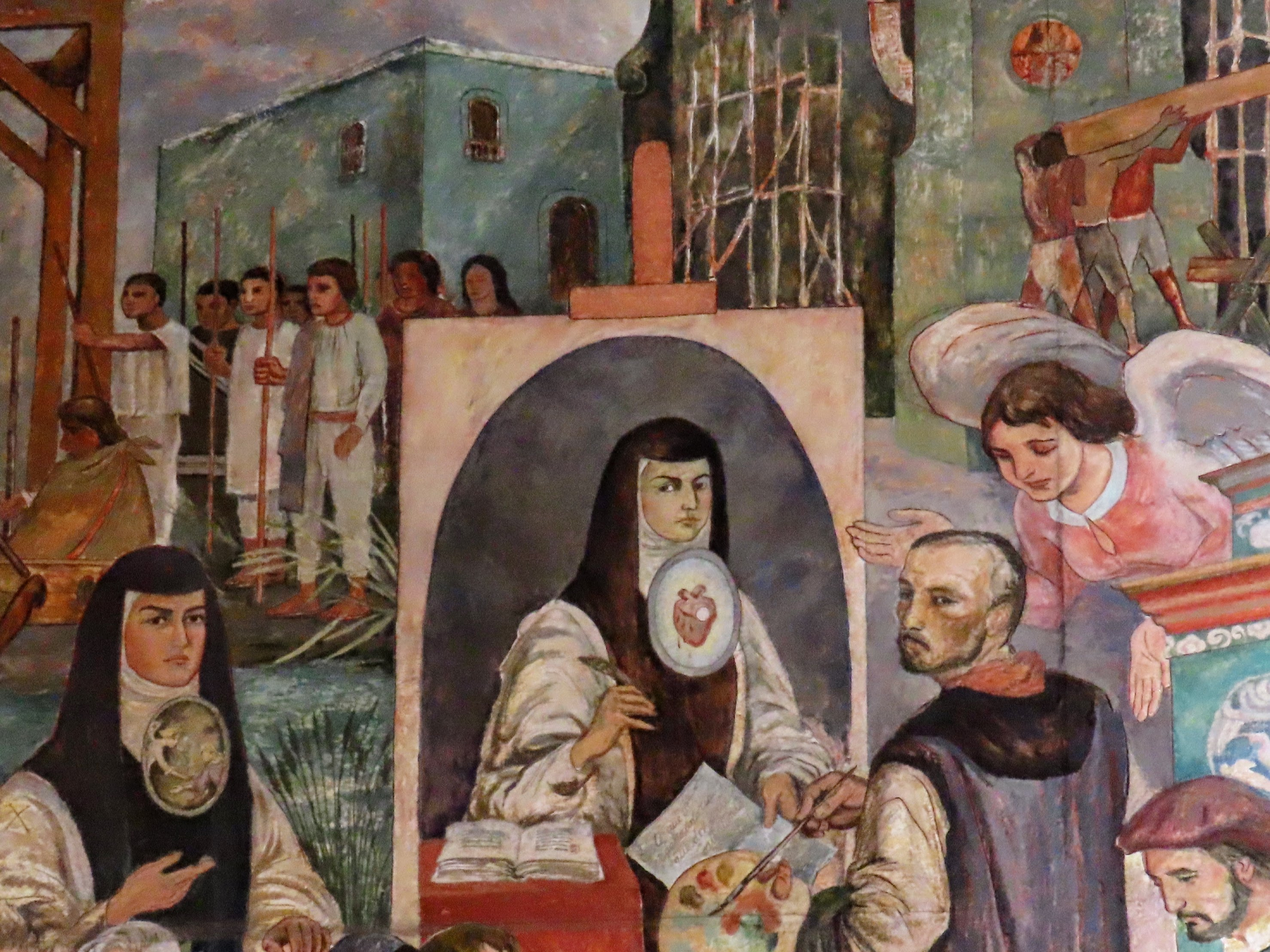
Miguel Cabrera painting Sor Juana with help

The image of Sor Juana Inés de la Cruz (1648–1695) and Miguel Mateo Maldonado Cabrera (1695–1768) fills the center of the colonial panel. Garcia Bustos, gives us another instance of an artist at work, as we saw in the prehispanic panel, with the painting of a codex. We see Cabrera working in his studio to produce the final product illustrated below. Note that Sor Juana died in 1695, the same year that Miguel Cabrera was born. Cabrera nevertheless painted the renowned portrait, And if you look closely, at the painting above, you'll see that García Bustos suggests that Cabrera received some angelic help. Again, the artist enjoyed making people smile. I

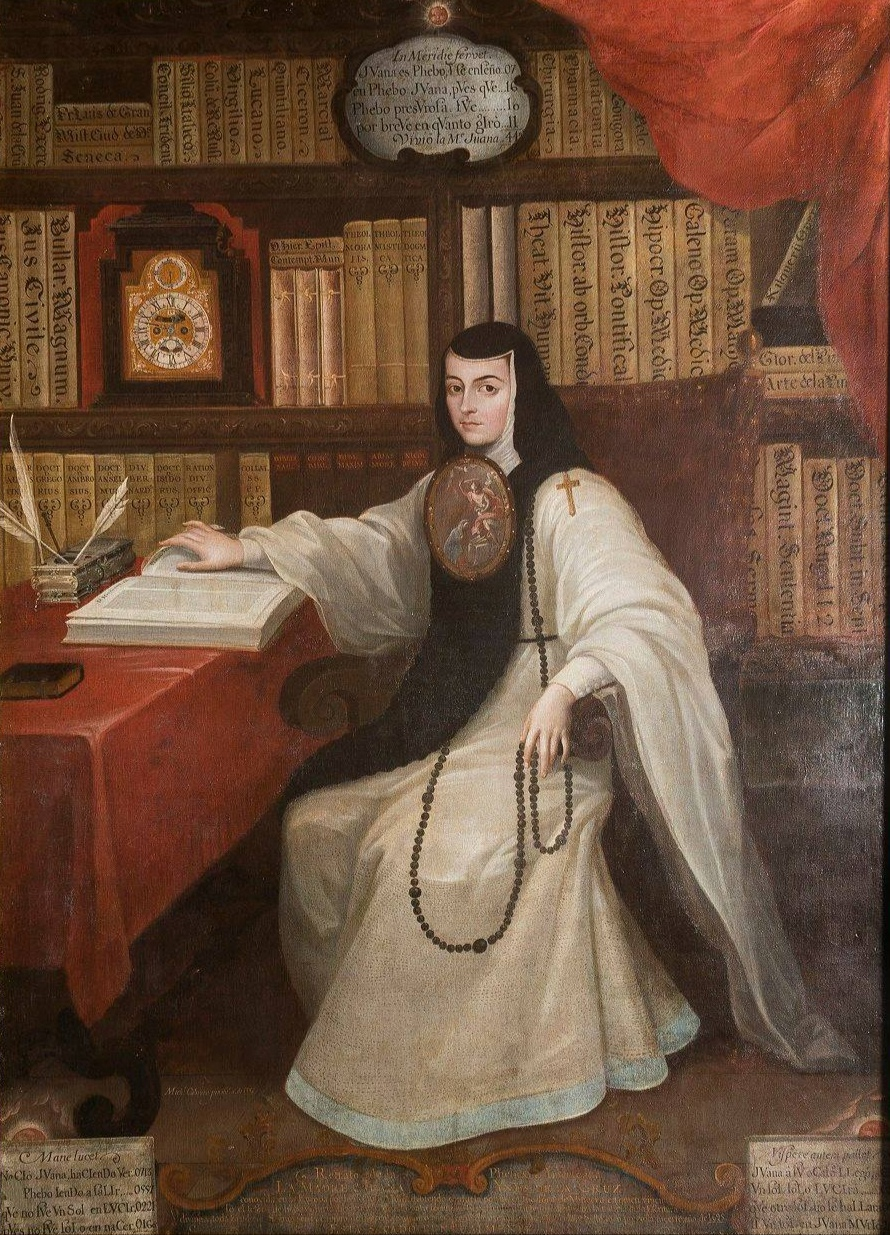
A copy of the actual famous painting of Sor Juana by Miguel Cabrera, painted around 1750

It appears that Cabrera relied on an existing representation of Sor Juana. Some suggest from the painting below by Juan de Miranda. Similarities are obvious.

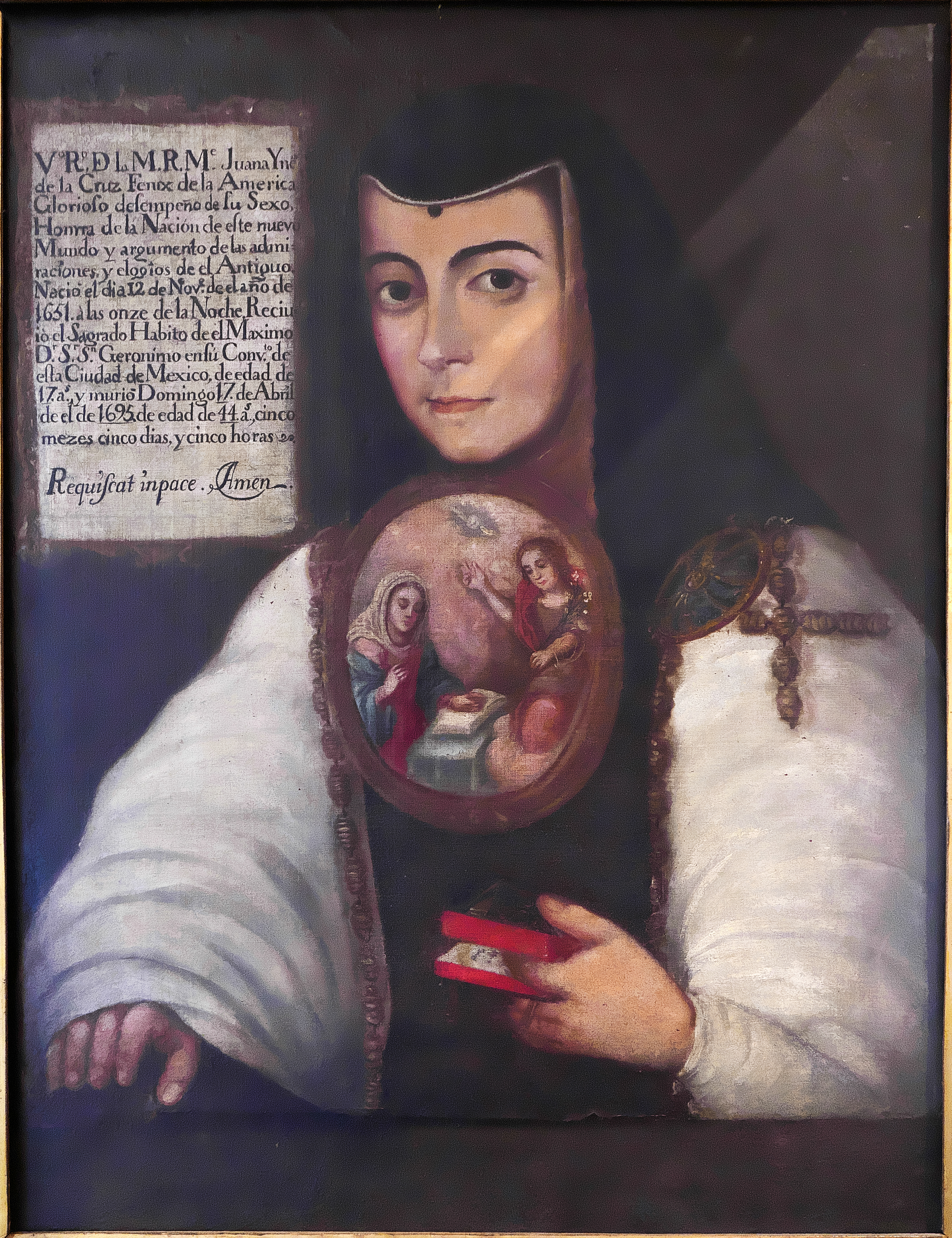
Sor Juana Inés de la Cruz attributed to Juan de Miranda. Convento of Santa Paula, Sevilla

Both Sor Juana and Miguel Cabrera were famous in the colony of Nueva España and Spain. Miguel Cabrera was born in what is now called the state of Oaxaca and became famous and rich for his rendering of the Virgin of Guadalupe, pictured below and many other Baroque pieces. The Virgin of Guadalupe is an essential aspect of all three periods covered in the mural panels. We will delve into her prehispanic origin as the goddess Tonantzin in the last panel when she was displayed prominently on the banners of the insurgents in the War of Independence and was given credit for victories, such as the capture of Oaxaca by Morelos and his soldiers.

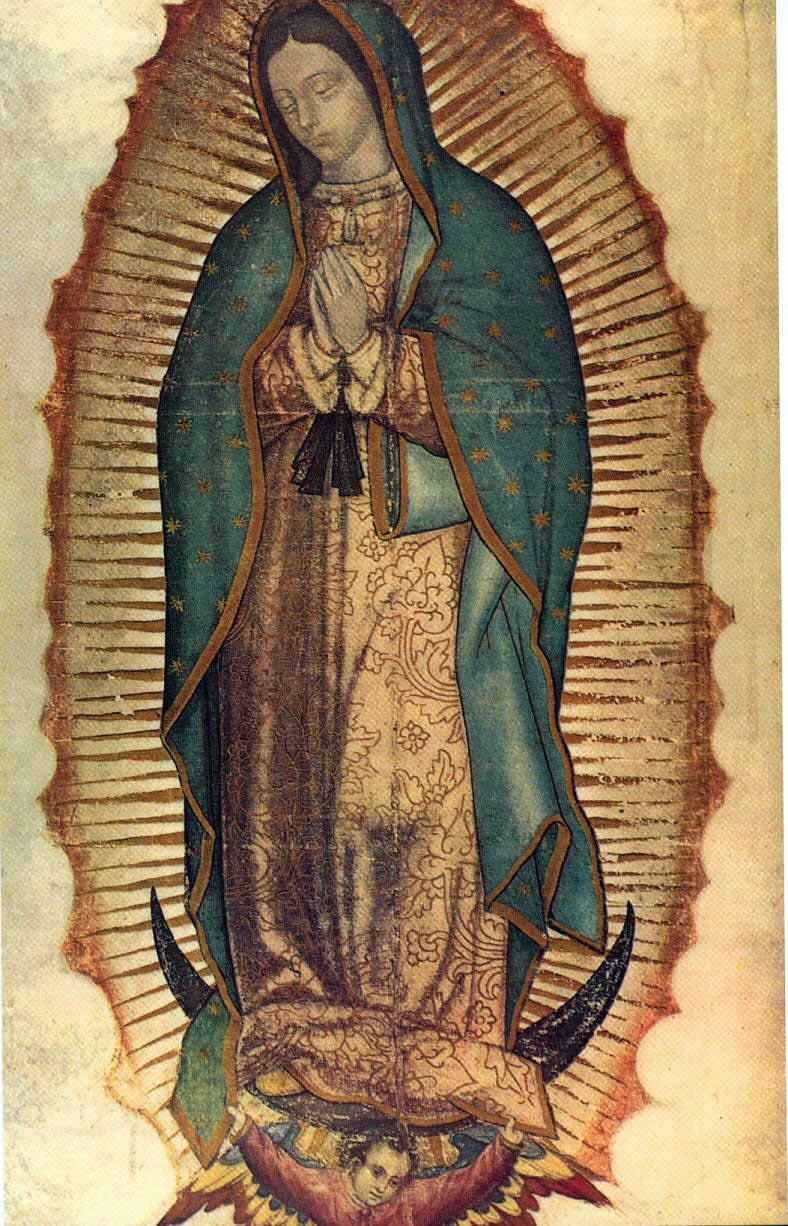
Virgin of Guadalupe by Miguel Cabrera

The role of Sor Juana in the History of Oaxaca

Sor Juana was not born in Antequera, but has an interesting connection with Antequera's artistic life. She wrote a play, performed in Antequera on 25 November 1691, the Feast of Santa Catarina, in the cathedral. The play is called a villancico (At the time this word referred to a type of play often with audience participation and now the word means a Christmas carol). The play touched on beauty, wisdom and love. It celebrated Christianity and feminine wisdom and included Greek and Roman references as well as references to Cleopatra. In the play, not necessarily on the life of Saint Catherine, we see many parallels with the life of Sor Juana. As was the case with Sor Juana, Saint Catherine is portrayed as precocious; and is devoted to God. She passes the challenge of wise men, as Sor Juana did in the vice regal court. St Catherine is considered the patron saint of academics so we can see why Sor Juana's, an intellectual, was drawn to her story. We can also see why Sor Juana, with her diverse knowledge and skills is appreciated by many Mexicans and is honored on currency and in other ways. Once again, we see Arturo García Bustos' realistic approach to painting. This time in the sense that he chose to paint an image of Sor Juana that is very similar to the original portrait by Cabrera.

Below, Diego Rivera included Sor Juana in his huge mural of Mexican historical figures, but unlike Garcia Bustos who follows well-known representations, Diego Rivera does not closely reflect the Cabrera and de Miranda versions.

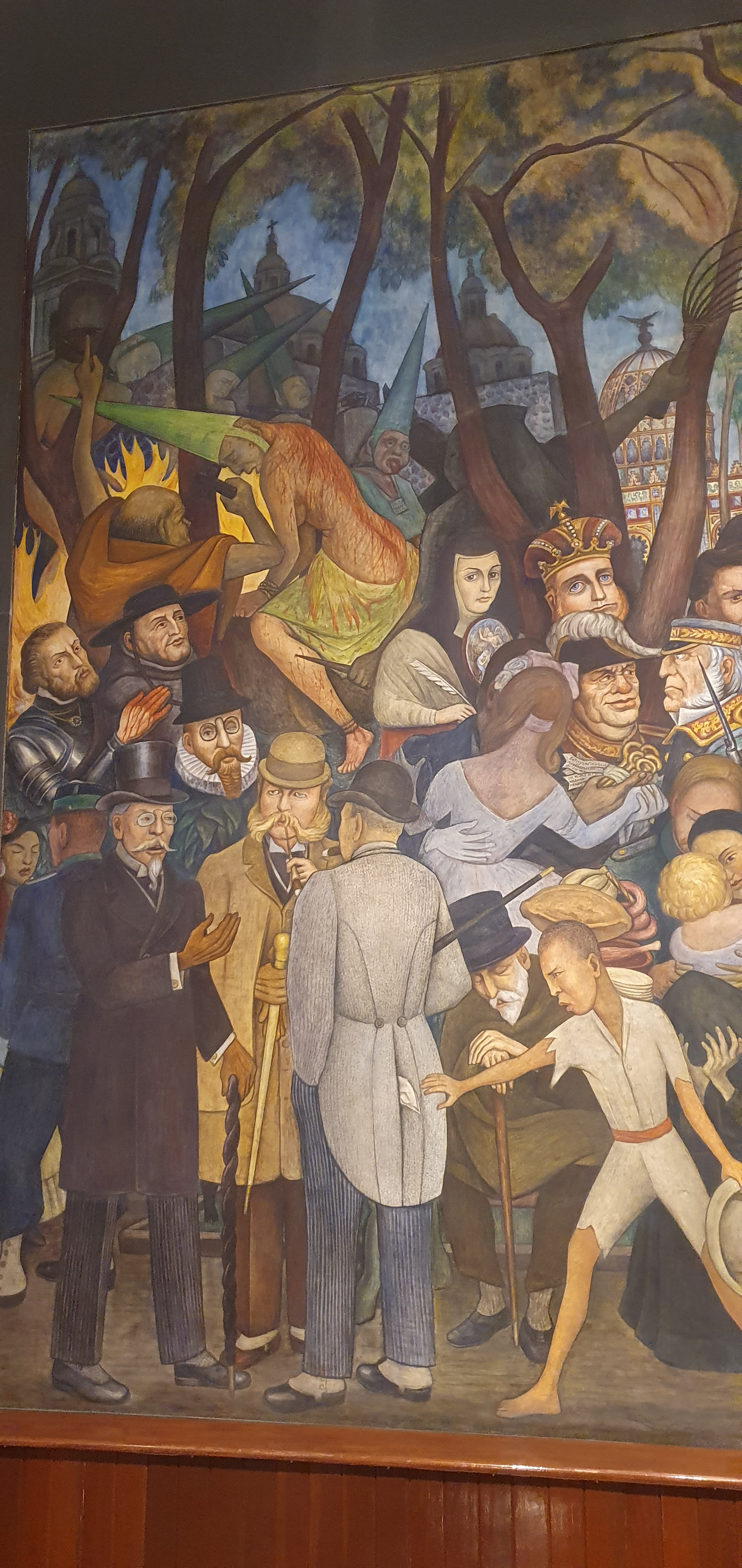
Dream of a Sunday Afternoon, including Sor Juana in the background - Museo Mural Diego Rivera

=== Antequera in the Baroque Period ===
The formative period in Mexican and Oaxacan history was the Era of Baroque from 1600 to 1750.

=== Cochineal ===
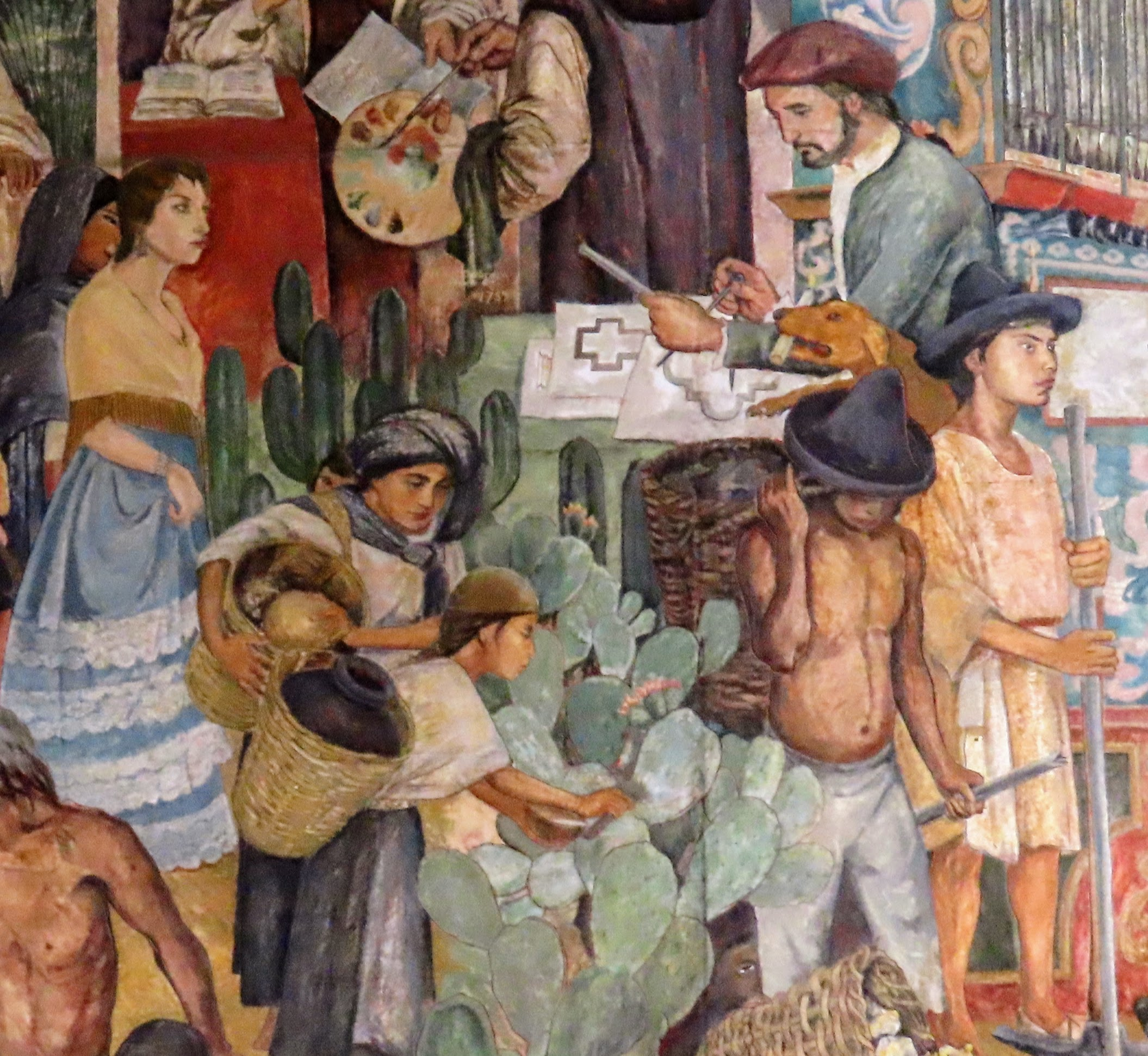

In the middle of the mural panel a peasant woman with a container on her back, is picking insects from nopal cactus to be used in producing bright red cochineal dye. It is estimated that the domestication of wild Cochineal insects into a more resistant and productive variety took thousands of years. At the bottom of the image, a young woman holds cloth that has been colored by dye made from Cochineal.

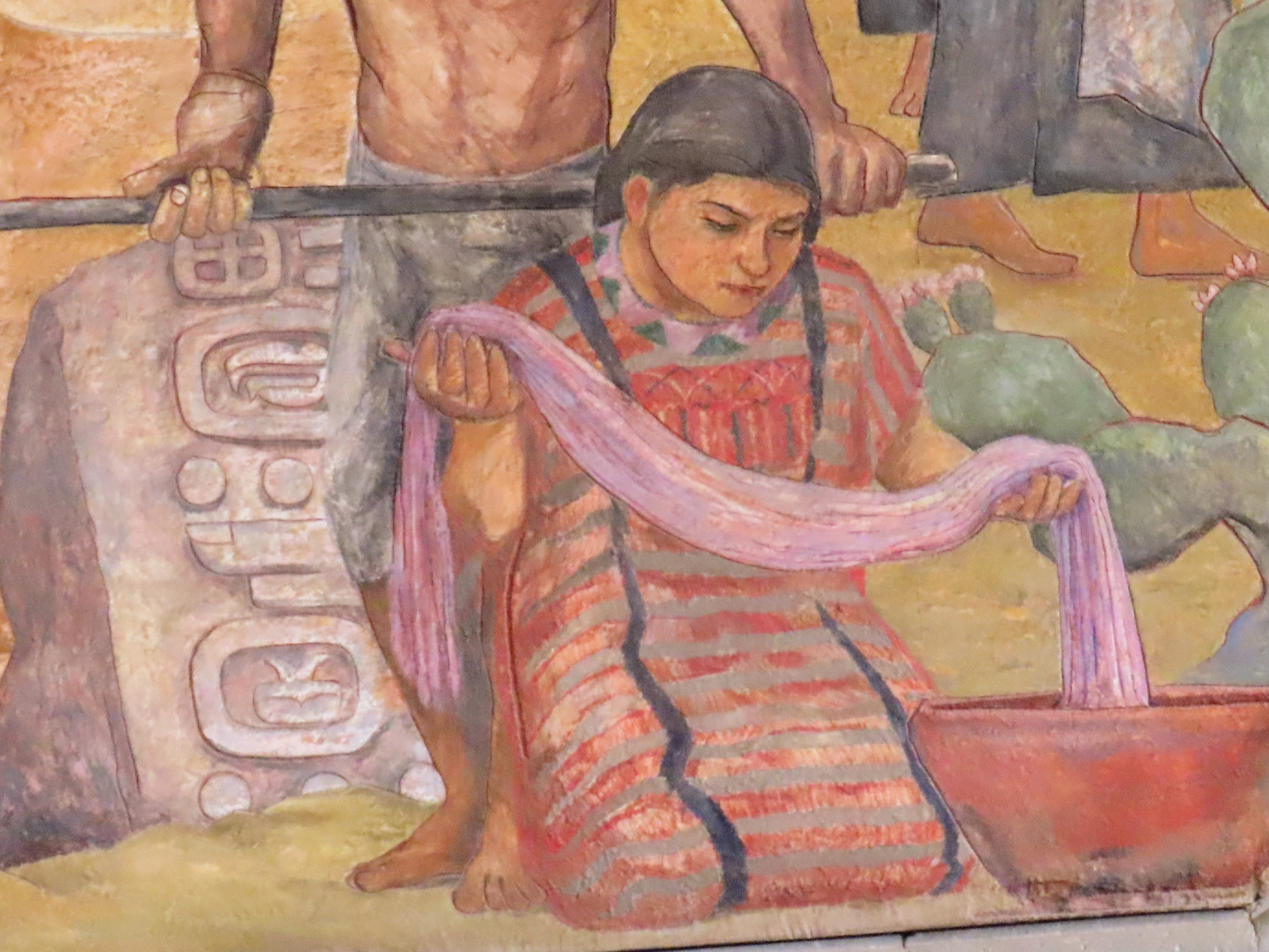
Material dyed from cochineal

This red dye made some Oaxacans rich, including the philanthropist, Manuel Fernández Fiallo. The last testament of Manuel Fernández Fiallo lists 20 churches, convents, schools and orphanages as well as individuals such as his enslaved servant whom he freed and granted money.

=== Manuel Fernández Fiallo, and Philanthropy ===
The top right corner of the image above, the pale green clothes of Manuel Fernández Fiallo de Boralla (1631-1708) evoke nopal leaves and some green nopal leaves are also depicted below him. It's likely that Garcia Bustos is telling us that nopal leaves and the insects that live on them producing a priceless red dye, made Fiallo rich. Another important aspect. The deeply religious Fiallo is drafting a church-like structure. Don Fiallo was a main benefactor for the construction of the following Oaxacan churches San Agustín, La Merced, San Francisco and Santa María del Marquesado, and more. A small brown dog, perhaps an Xoxo or Xoloitzcuintle, near the left elbow of Don Fiallo evokes symbolism of the Dominican order, the first to send friars to Oaxaca and the builders of main churches like Santo Domingo.

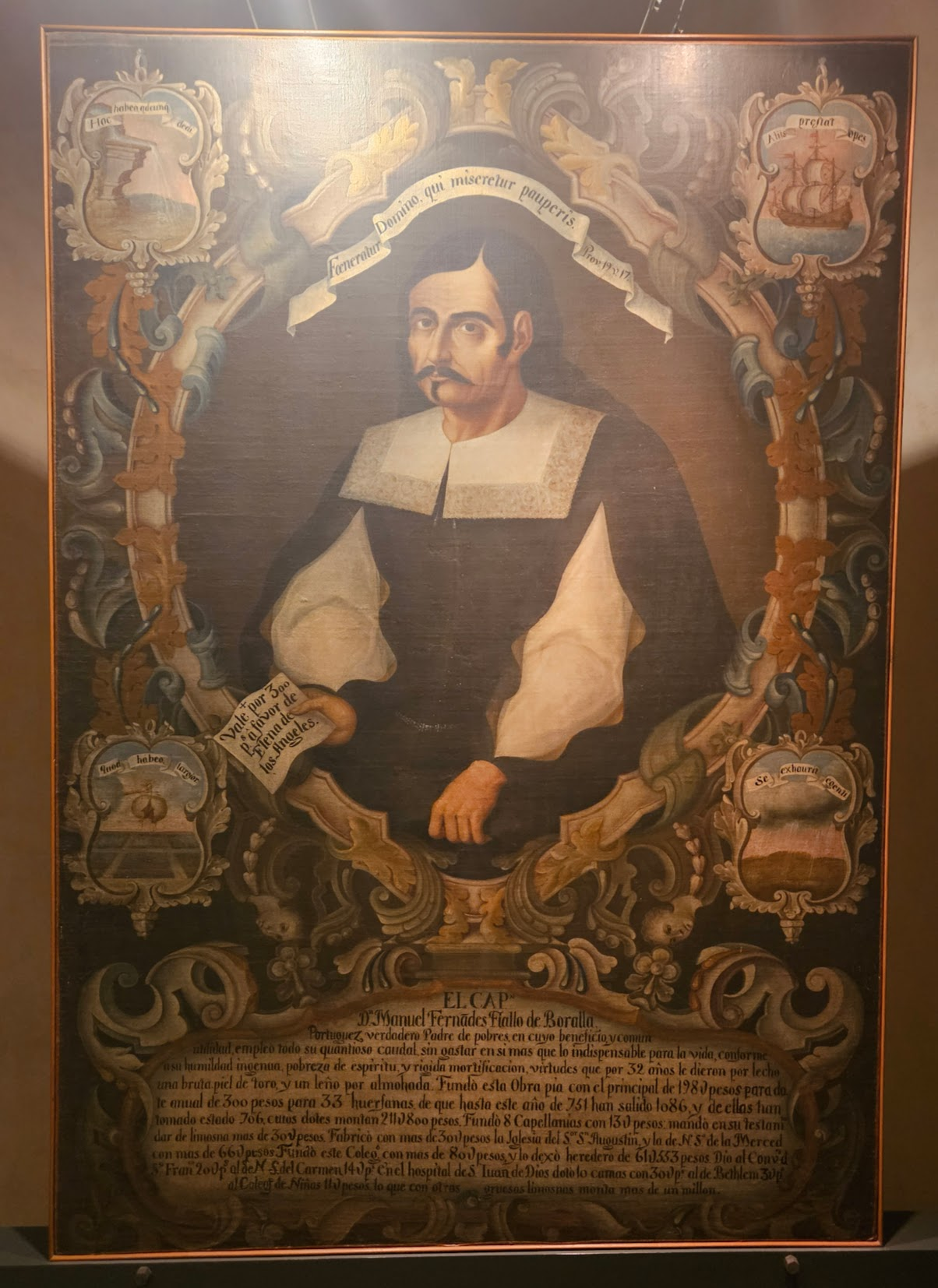
Manuel Fernández Fiallo from the Museum of Cultures of Oaxaca

==== Recognition of Fiallo ====
Fiallo deserves abundant recognition and Garcia Bustos has undertaken to do that. Also, it seems that Fiallo is the only "peninsular" (Spaniards and Portuguese born on the Iberian Peninsula) recognized in the naming of Oaxaca's streets. Also, worthy of note is that it seems that reference to Fiallo, state that he was Portuguese. Oaxaca city officials dedicated a small square to the philanthropist, on the corner of Fiallo and Independencia. The small park contains a statue and a list of some of his philanthropic works. Both are pictured below.

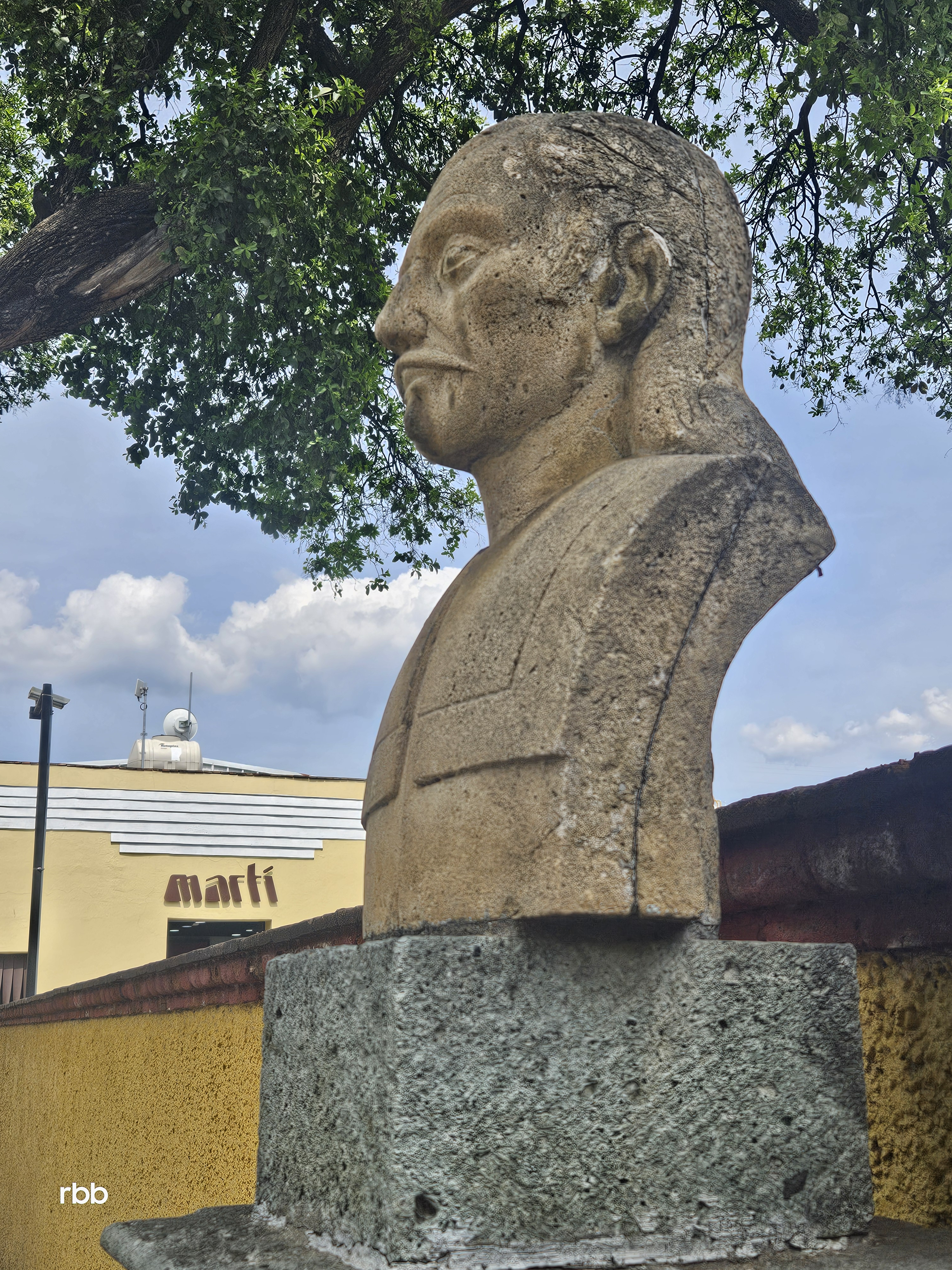
Manuel Fernández Fiallo

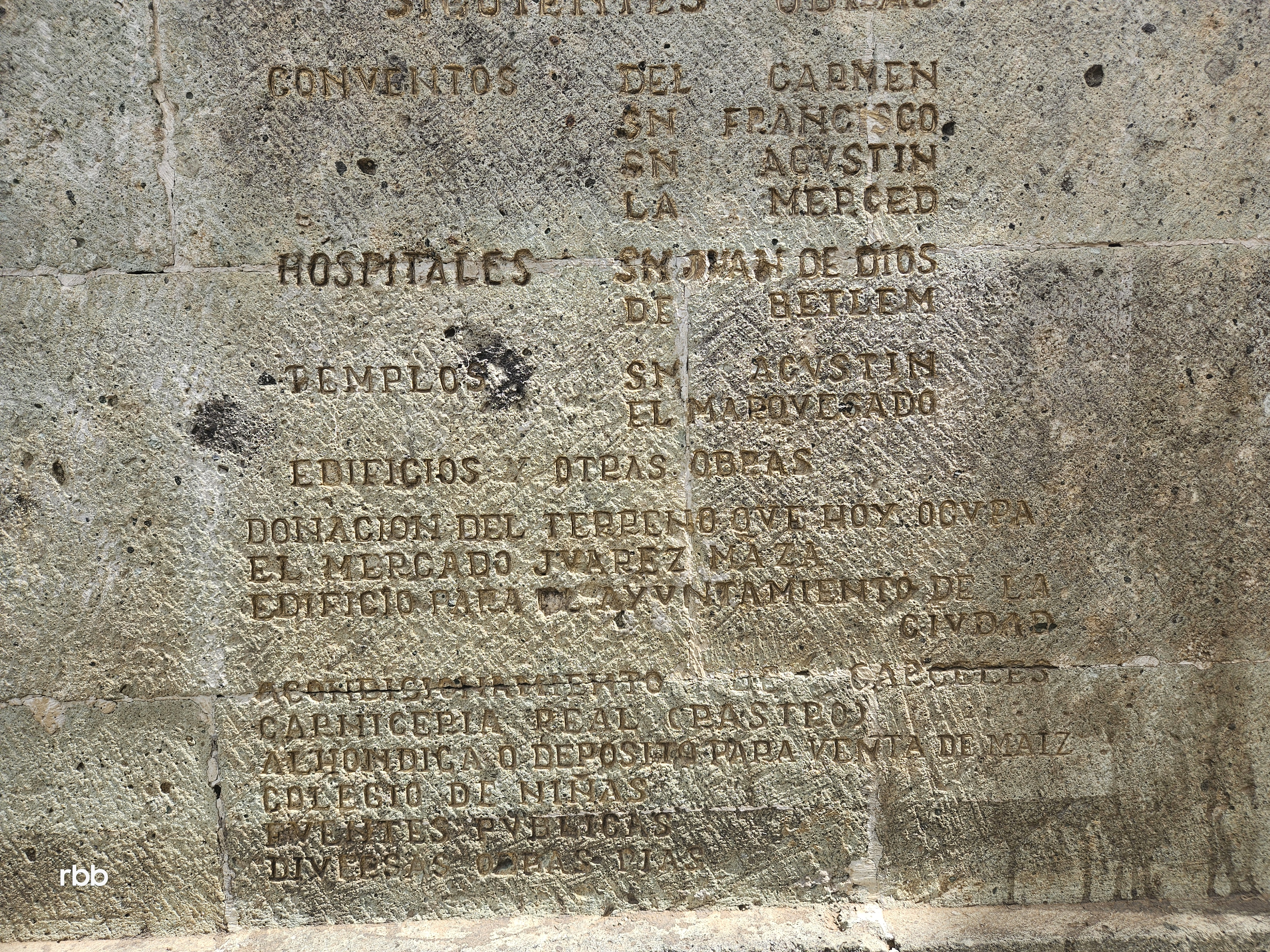
Philanthropic works by Manuel Fernández Fiallo

==== Baroque organs ====
The blue-green object behind Manuel Fernández Fiallo is a baroque organ. It appears to be the organ of San Jerónimo Tlacochahuaya, also pictured below. It is one of hundreds that were installed in the religious buildings of Antequera. Today many are being restored and played. If you get the opportunity, be sure to attend a concert of the Instituto de Órganos Históricos de Oaxaca. You might have a chance, as I did, to watch Cicely Winter playing the Baroque organ pictured here. (26-4). While contemplating the majesty of La Basílica de Nuestra Señora de la Soledad, and the power of the music, recall the generations of Oaxacans stirred by this instrument during funerals, masses, and other celebrations.

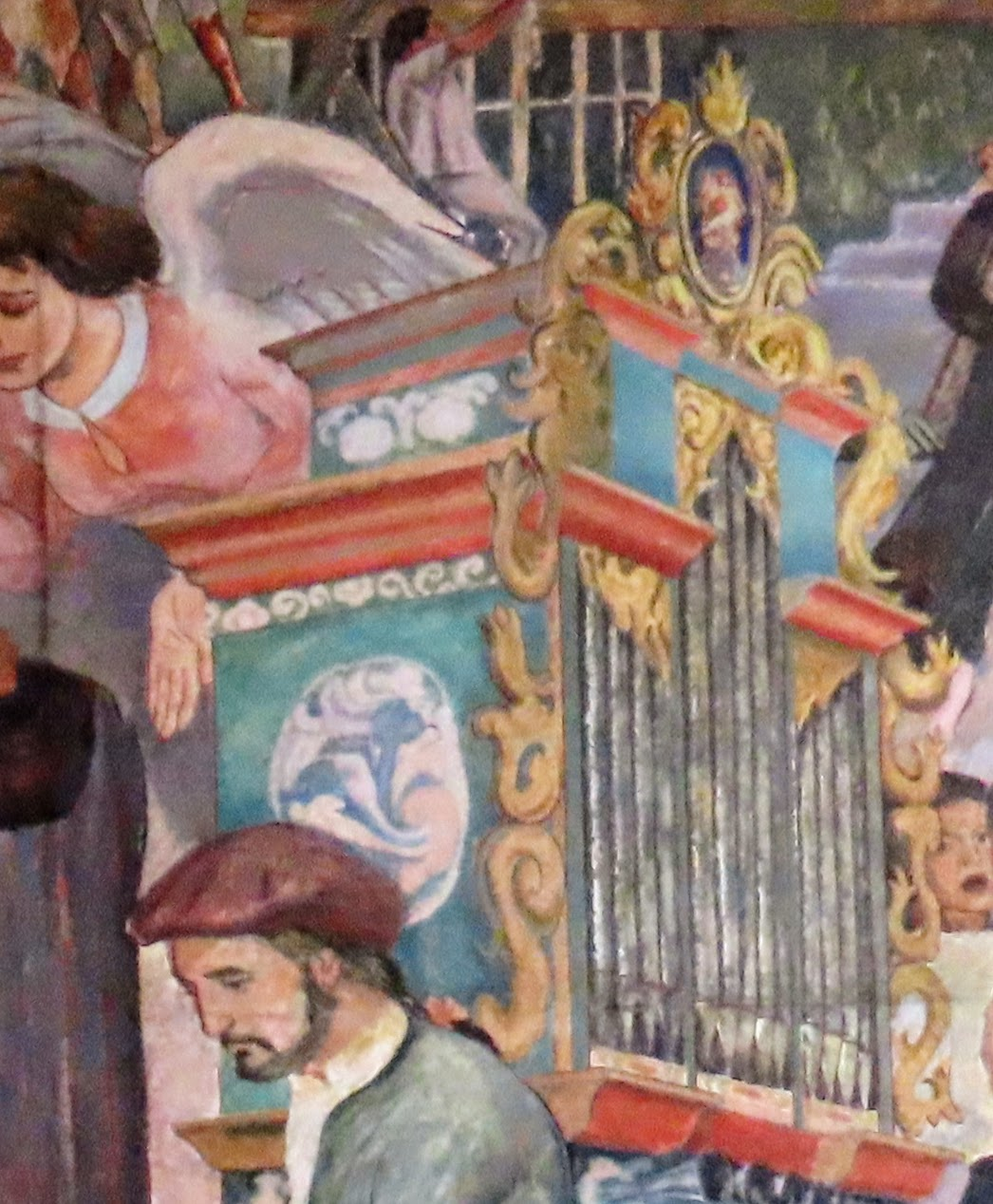
A baroque organ behind Manuel Fernández Fiallo

==== Music and Christianity ====
Music was used by religious orders to convert indigenous people to Christianity. We see a friar, possibly the famous Baroque composer, Manuel de Sumaya, leading a choir. Between 1745 and 1755, Manuel de Sumaya (1680-1755) wrote and conducted music in the Cathedral of Oaxaca, formally known as The Cathedral of Our Lady of the Assumption. Juan Matías (ca.1618–ca.1667) was a Zapotec Musician who became maestro de capilla of the Oaxaca cathedral in 1655. He was the only indigenous musician to attain this post during colonial rule. These two musicians and others made Oaxaca one of the most notable musical centers in New Spain and the tradition continues today. The state of Oaxaca has one of many Mexican regional styles of music.

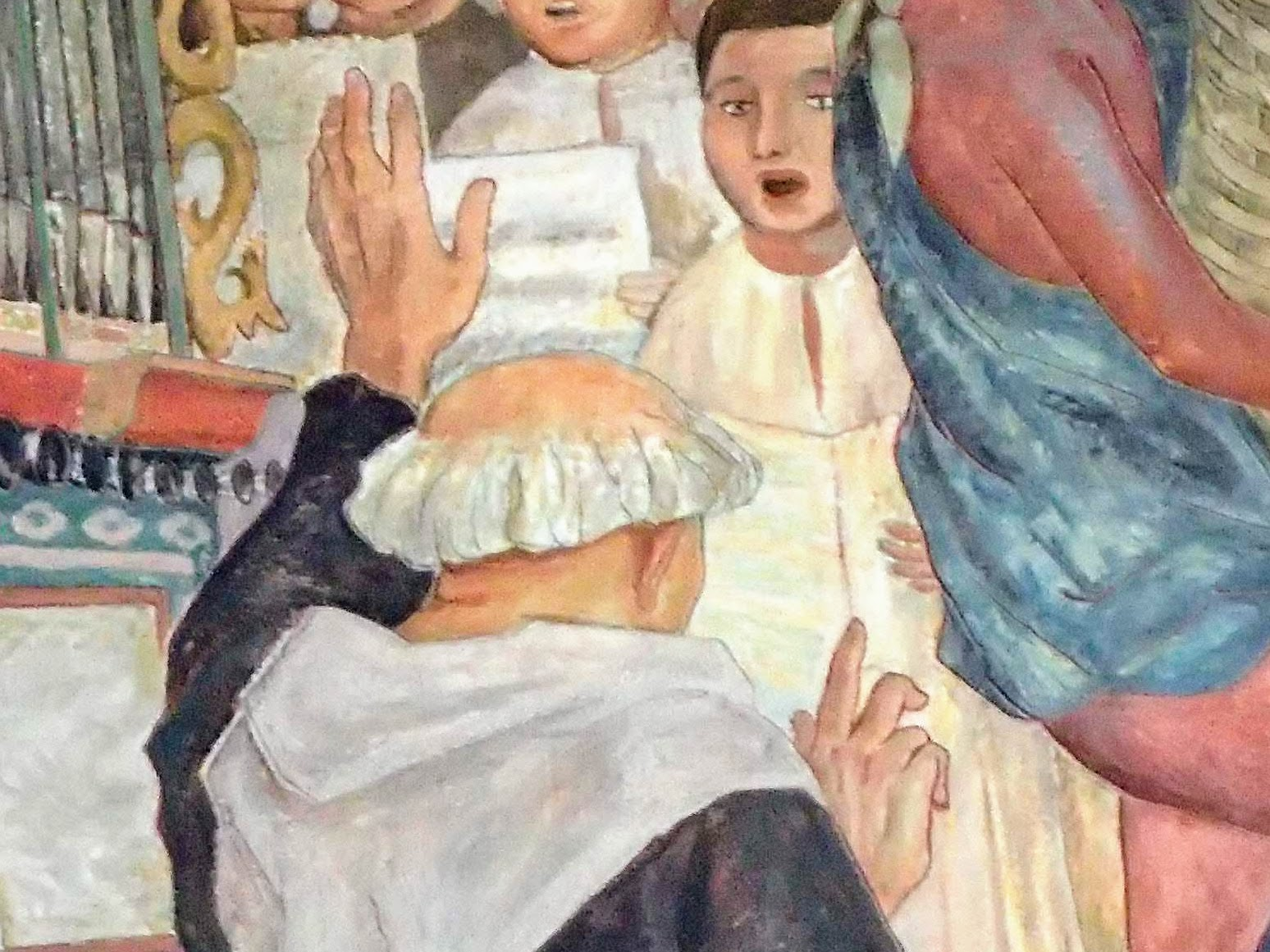
Possibly Manual de Sumaya

=== Friar, Catholicism and imposing architecture ===
At the bottom right of the panel, a compassionate looking preacher obscures a Dominican coat of arm. In a typical Dominican black robe, this friar holds a cross in one hand and what appears as a piece of wood in another. This image is somewhat evocative of Bartolomé de las Casas pictured above and evokes some of the same piety and devotion to the Dominican cause.

When Hernán Cortés made his first landing in what is now Mexico, at San Juan de Ulúa on Maundy Thursday, 21 April 1519, it is said that he immediately ordered the erection of a cross. Thus, Mexico's long process of religious acculturation had begun eventually under the leadership of the Catholic Church in Mexico. And this was also the beginning of the Spanish conquest of the Aztec Empire.

Today Oaxaca has a dozen open Catholic churches from the colonial period, and a few that are closed for repairs. And imposing former convents, called ex-convents, are spread throughout the city have served as various public and private buildings including hospitals, jails, museums, hotels and schools.

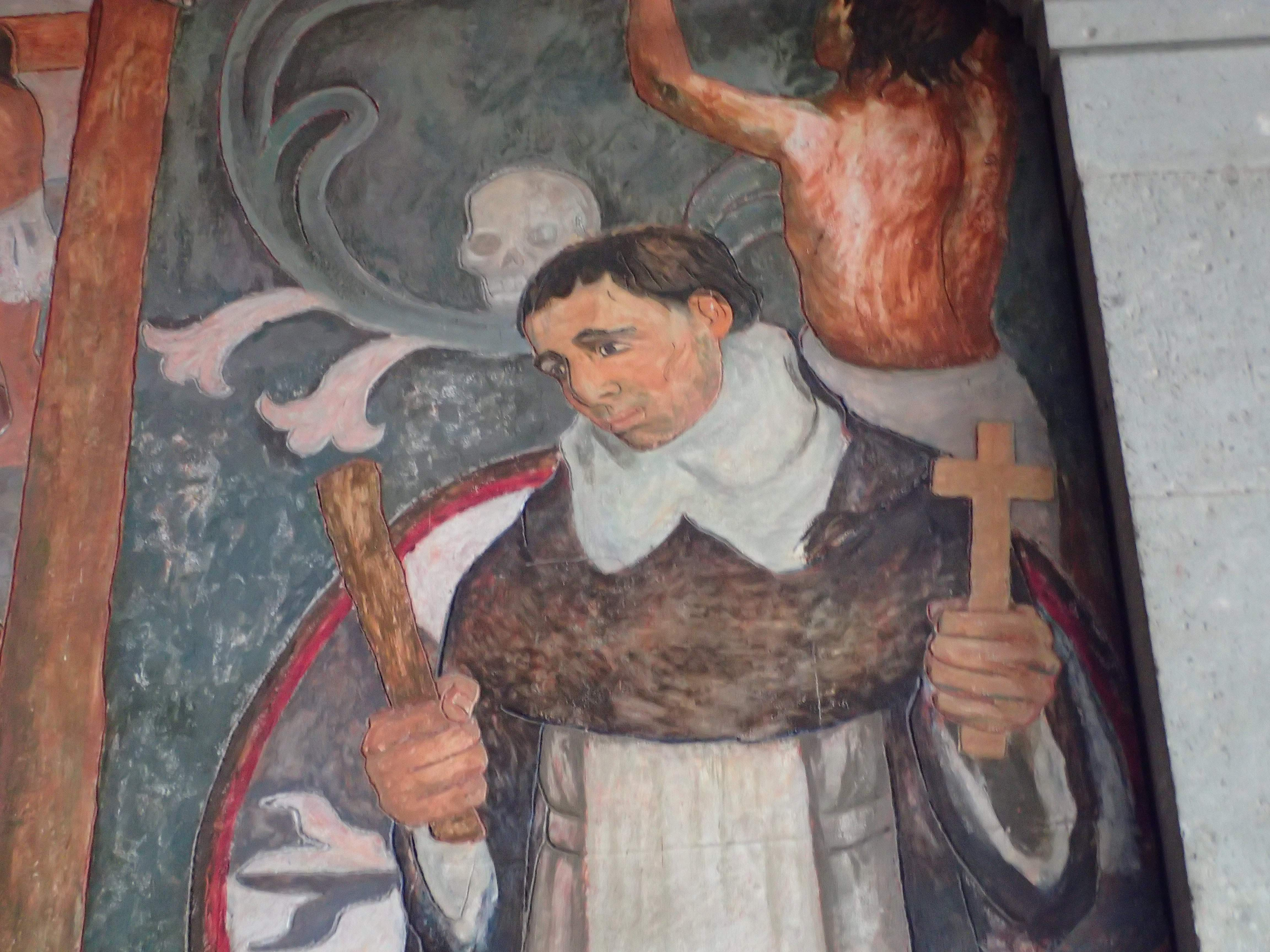
A preacher in front of a Dominican coat of arms

=== Craftsmen ===
Craftsmen in the colonial era are pictured forging metal. They are in front of remnants of the creations of prehispanic craftsmen. The remnant of a round column evokes one-thousand year-old stone-work from the prehispanic period that exist to this day at Mitla, (pictured below). The stone column or steal with hieroglyphs in Zapotec script reflect the writing that visitors can view at Monte Albán today, (also pictured below). This is one of the earliest Mesoamerican writing systems from some 2,000 years ago.

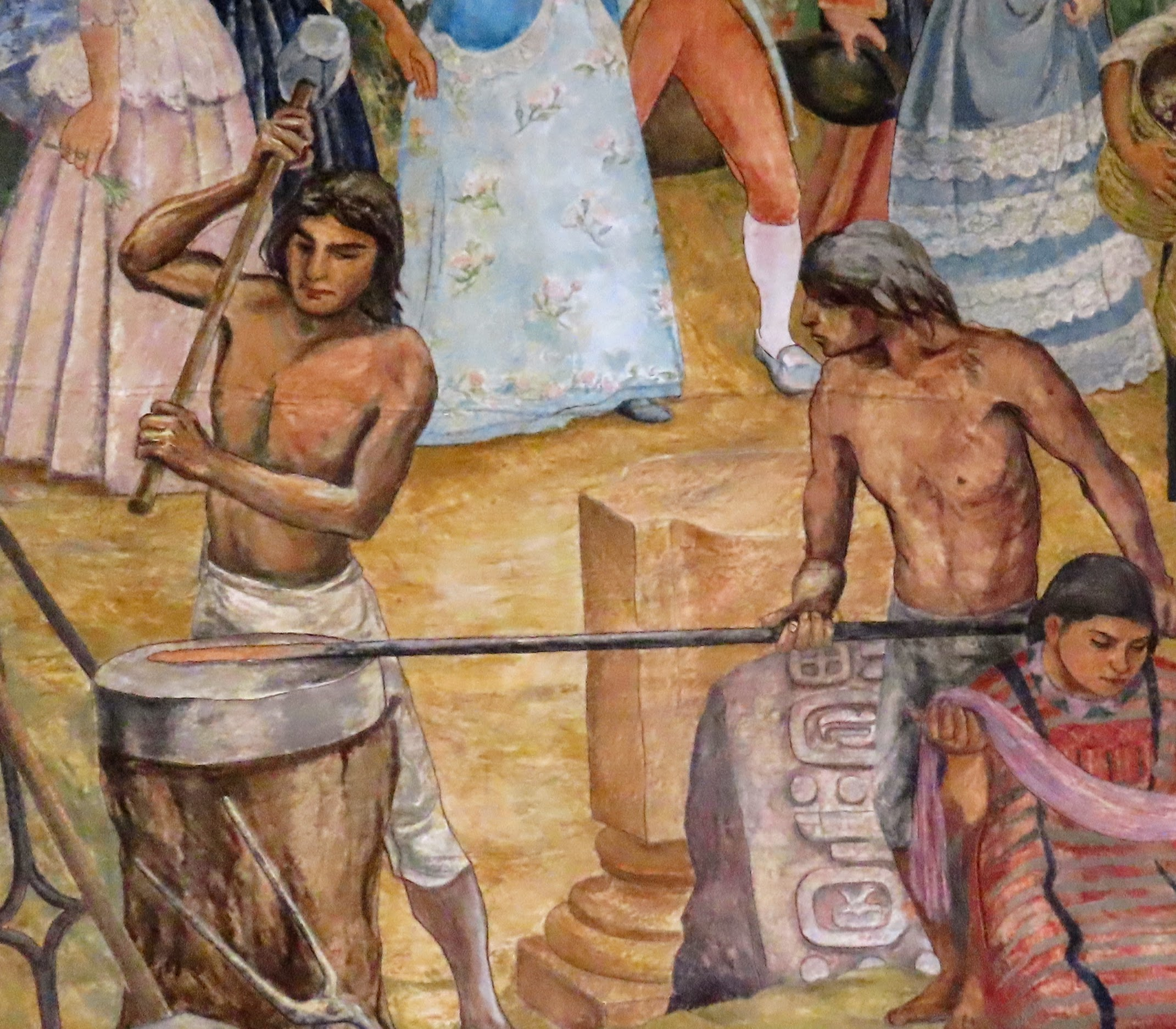
Colonial craftsmen working with metal with prehispanic stone remnants in the background.

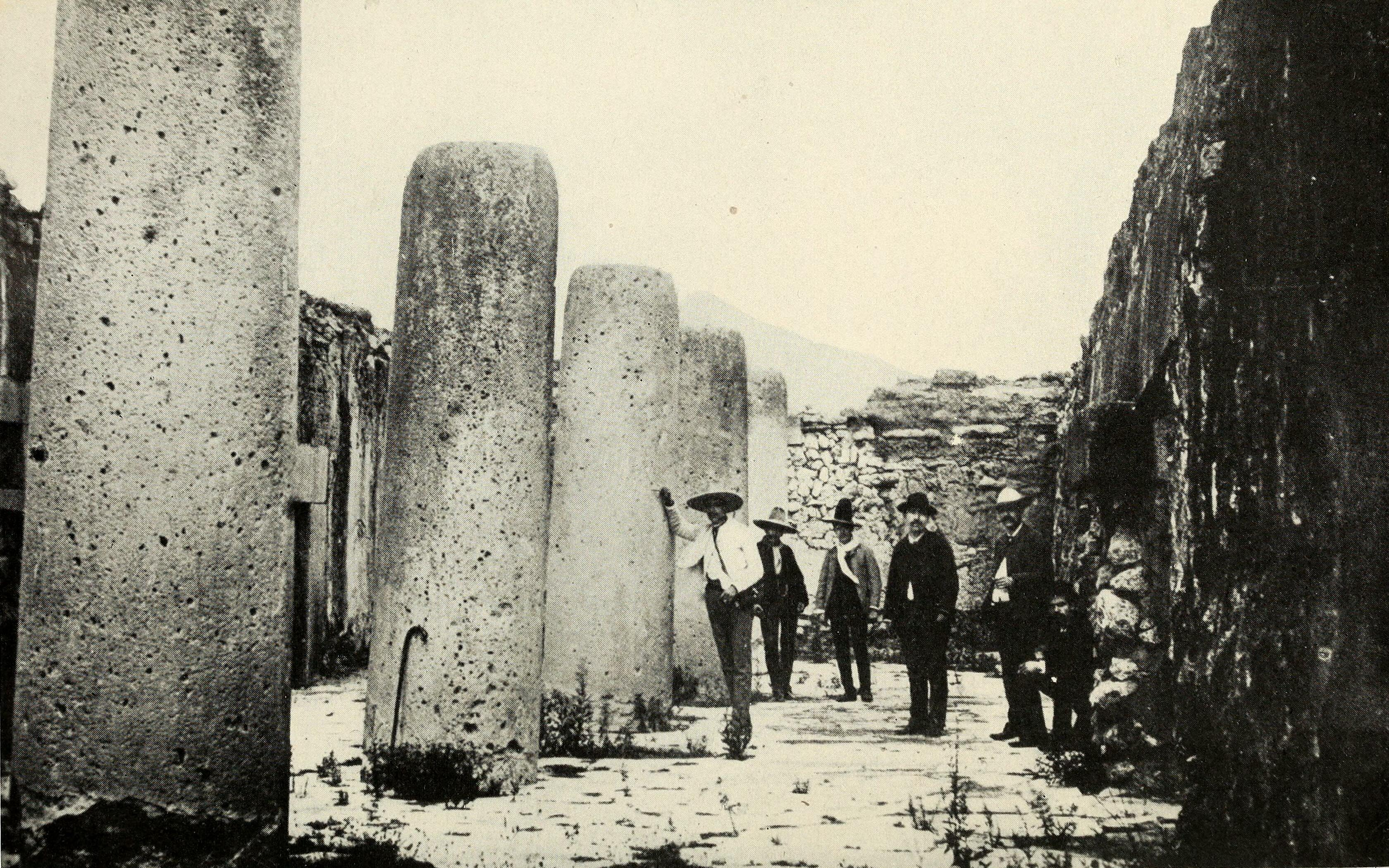
Mitla showing stone columns

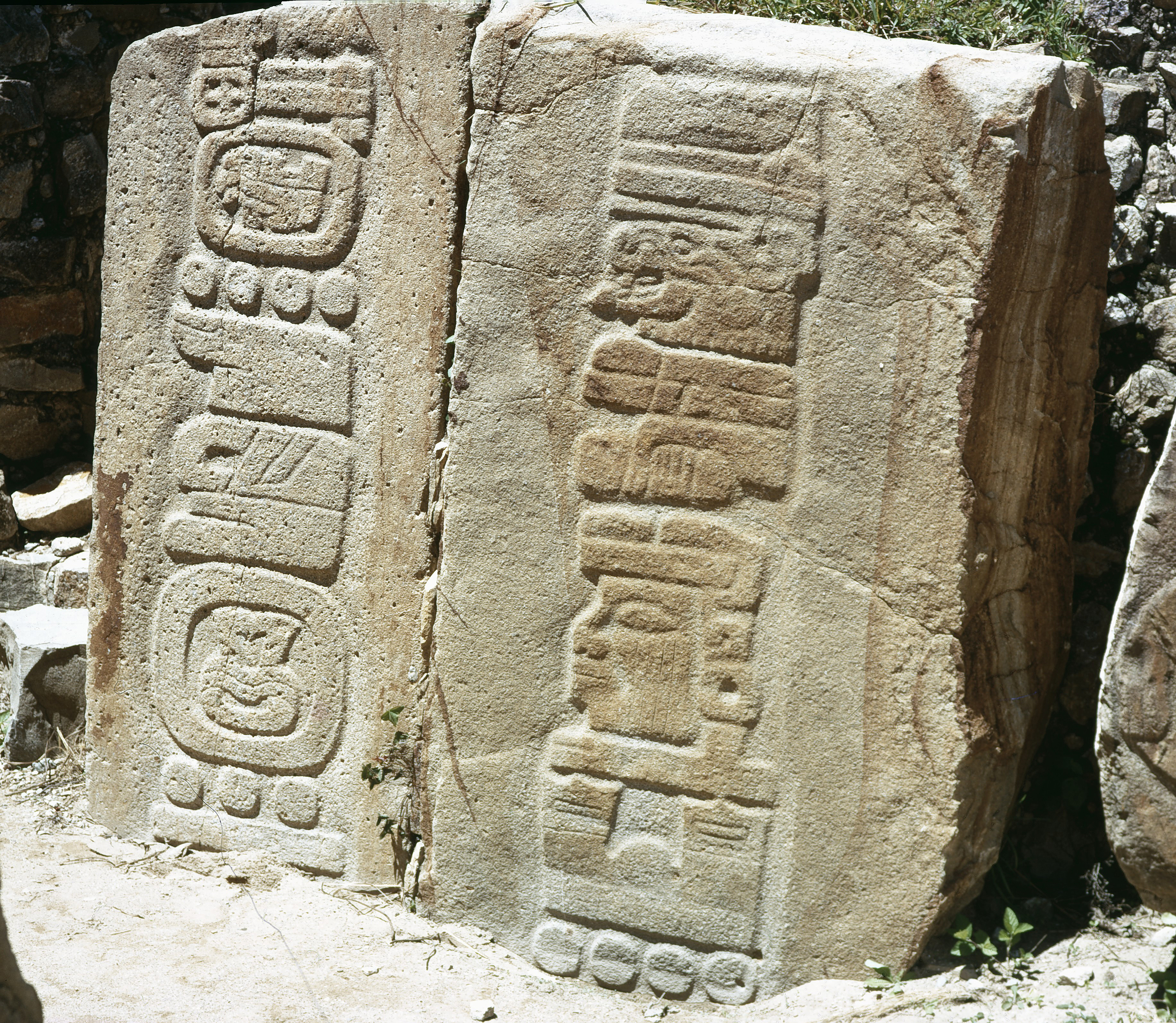
Zapotec script at Monte Albán

=== Spanish Colonizers ===
Five characters on the left side of the colonial panel contrast in dress to the people at the top of the page, illustrating the change in the composition of the population of Antequera during the colonial period. Observing clothes and skin color, three wearing bright clothes are Criollo people. Of the two darker-skinned women, the one wearing the black dress could be mestizo and the one carrying the lamp could be indigenous. including the one holding the lamp appear to be Mestizo. We see in these images the influence of the Mexican melting pot, where unlike some other western hemisphere colonization efforts, the cultures were blended in Antequera and later Oaxaca. Life was nevertheless dominated by a system of institutional discrimination in the form of casts.

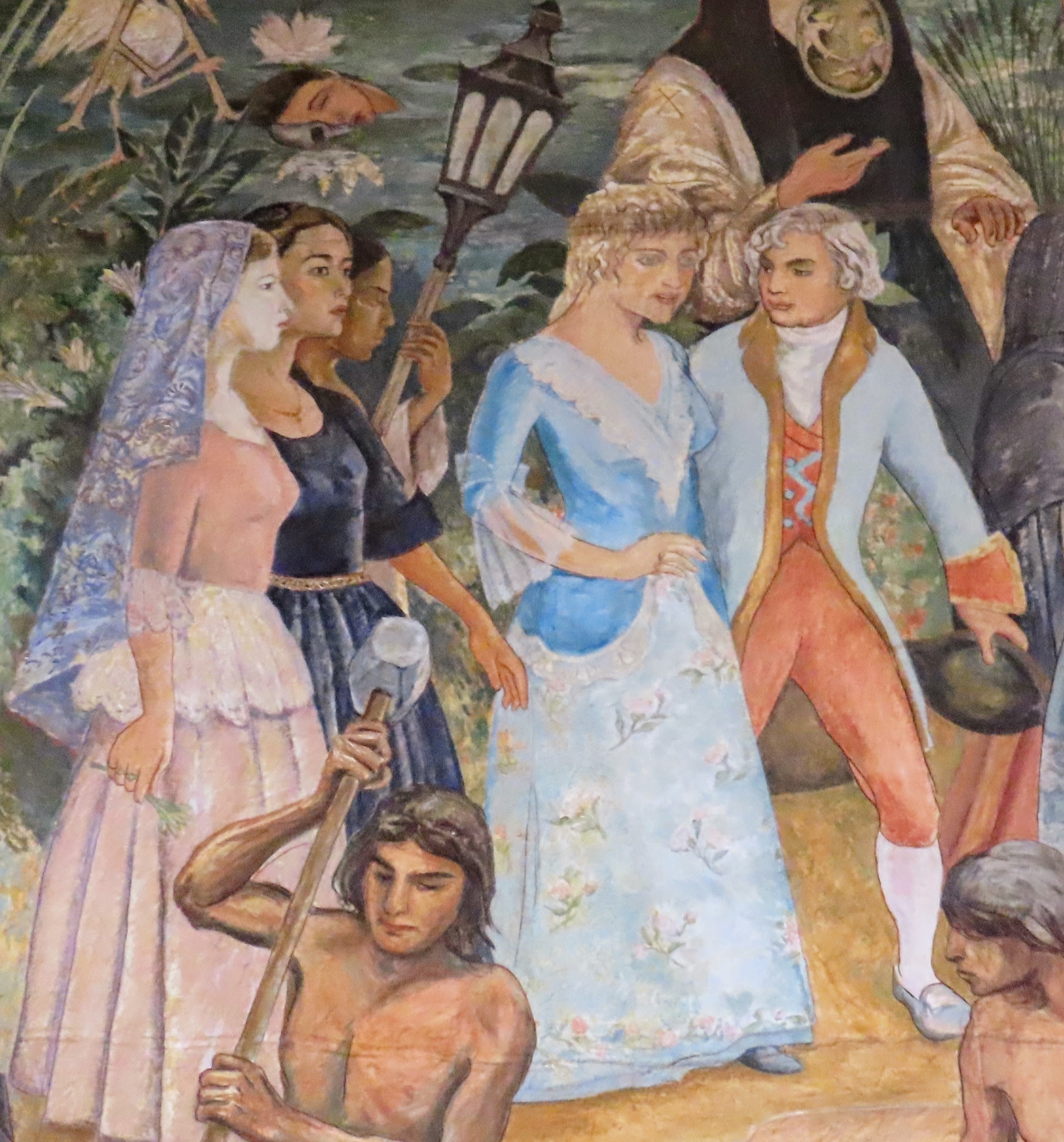
Criollos and Mestizos during the colonial period

==== A Familiar Live Model ====
The woman above in the dark dress resembles the woman below, Rina Lazo, the wife of the artist. The model for the younger woman was the daughter of the artist.

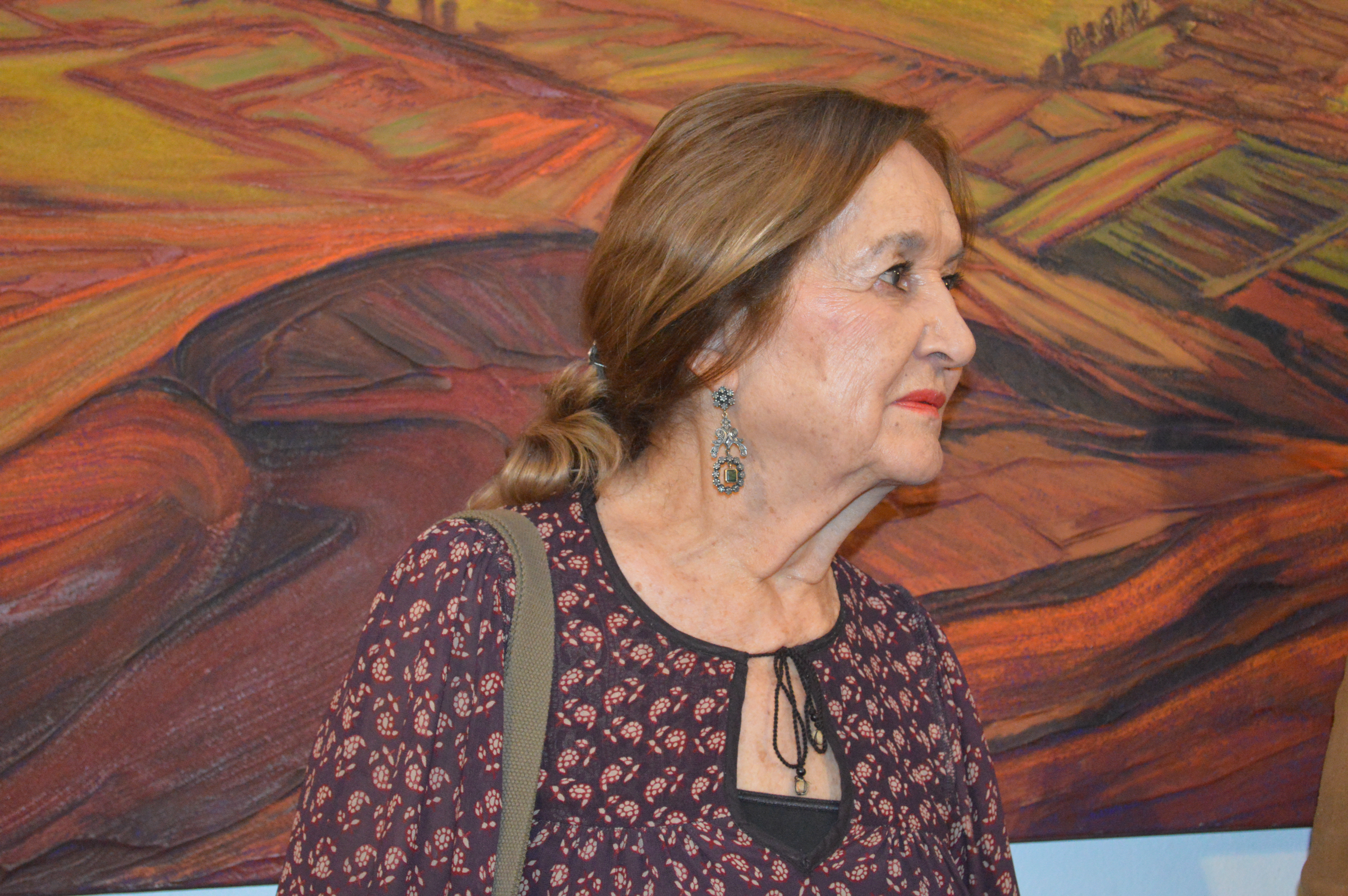
Rina Lazo resembles the woman pictured above in the black dress

=== A Surprise Visitor ===
We have seen evidence of the playfulness of Arturo García Bustos in his portrayal of himself as a pre-Hispanic character, and in the image of an angel helping Miguel Carrera paint the famous portrait of Sor Juana. Further evidence of García Bustos' sense of humor is seen in the image below. The story is that tricks were played on the artist as he went about his monumental project. The culprit was thought to be a ghost. The image below depicts the culprit, located between the nopal leaves and the spilled basket. This is the story that Oaxacans remember from their childhood visits to see the mural. Arturo Garcia Bustos loved to entertain.

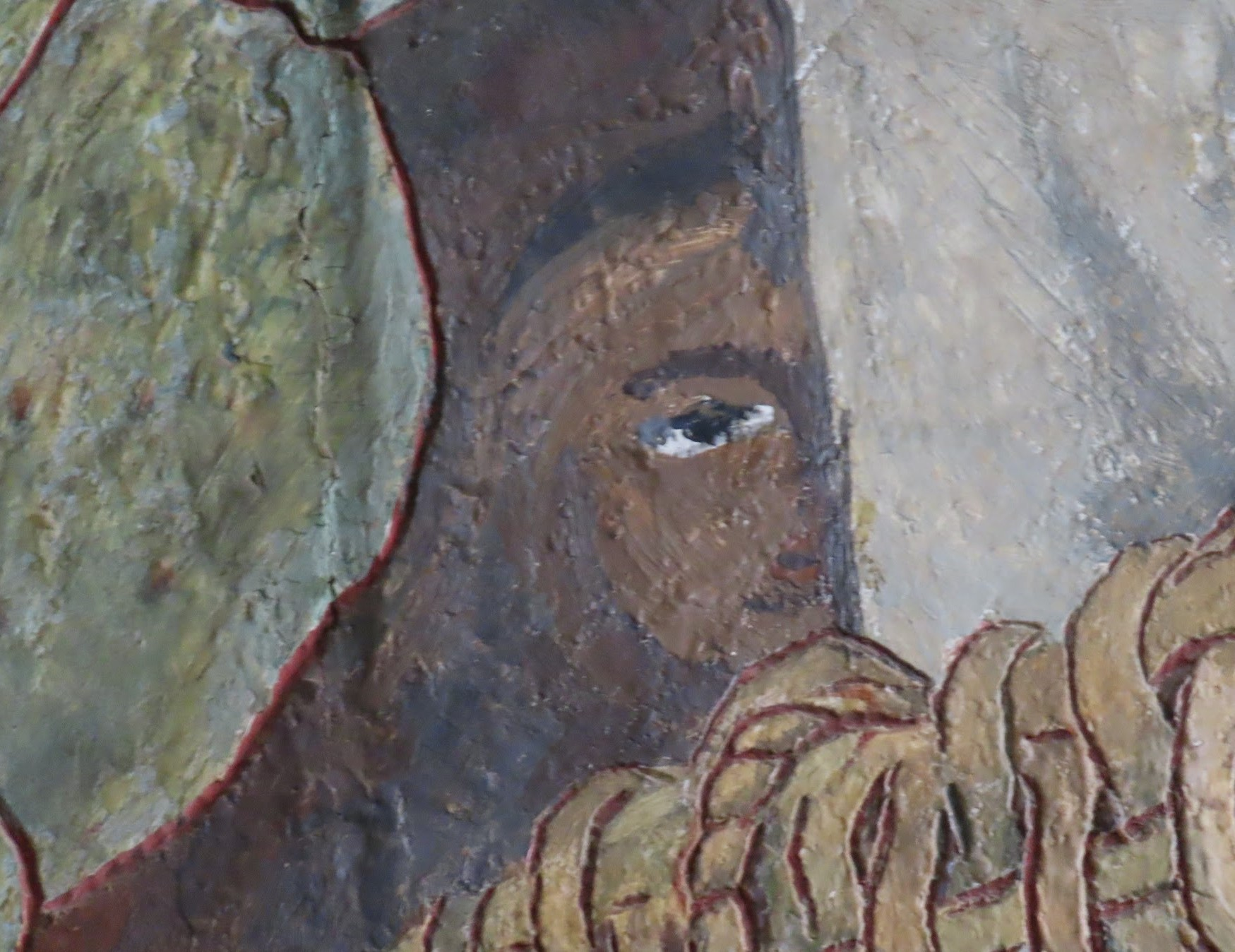
The trickster ghost revealed by García Bustos

== Independence, Reform, Revolution Panel ==
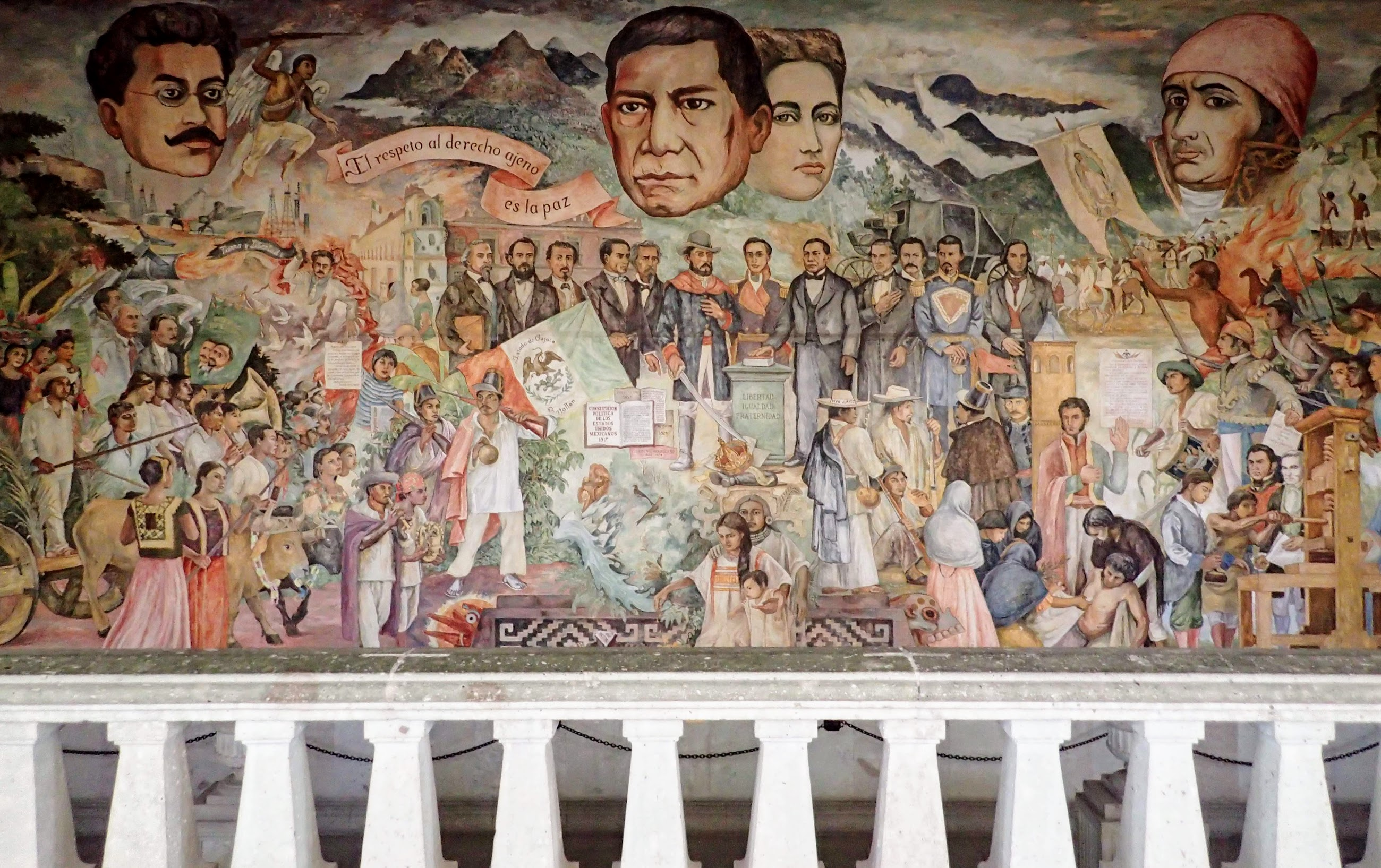
The independence/reform/revolution panel

The major topics of the middle panel are the War of Independence (1810–21), the Reform movement often led by Benito Juárez (1854-1876) and the Mexican Revolution (1910-1921). The French Invasion has a mior role.

=== Five Civil Wars ===
In a period of 119 years (1810 to 1929) five civil wars involved the people of Oaxaca. These civil wars are the War of Independence (1810–21), War of Reform (1857-60), the Second French Invasion (1861–67), the Mexican Revolution, (1910–21) and to a minor extent, the Cristero War (1926–29). The image below combines elements from various Mexican wars. Even the French Invasion which is sometimes positioned as a foreign invasion between France and Mexico is a civil war in the sense that the Mexican Conservatives sought and encouraged Maximilian and the French to invade Mexico. (The conservative forces lost the War of Reform and they thought that setting up Maximilian as head of state would ensure the supremacy of conservative and Catholic values. Likewise Mexicans fought on the side of the French and ultimately when the victorious Juárez forces executed Maximillian, they also executed two Mexican generals.

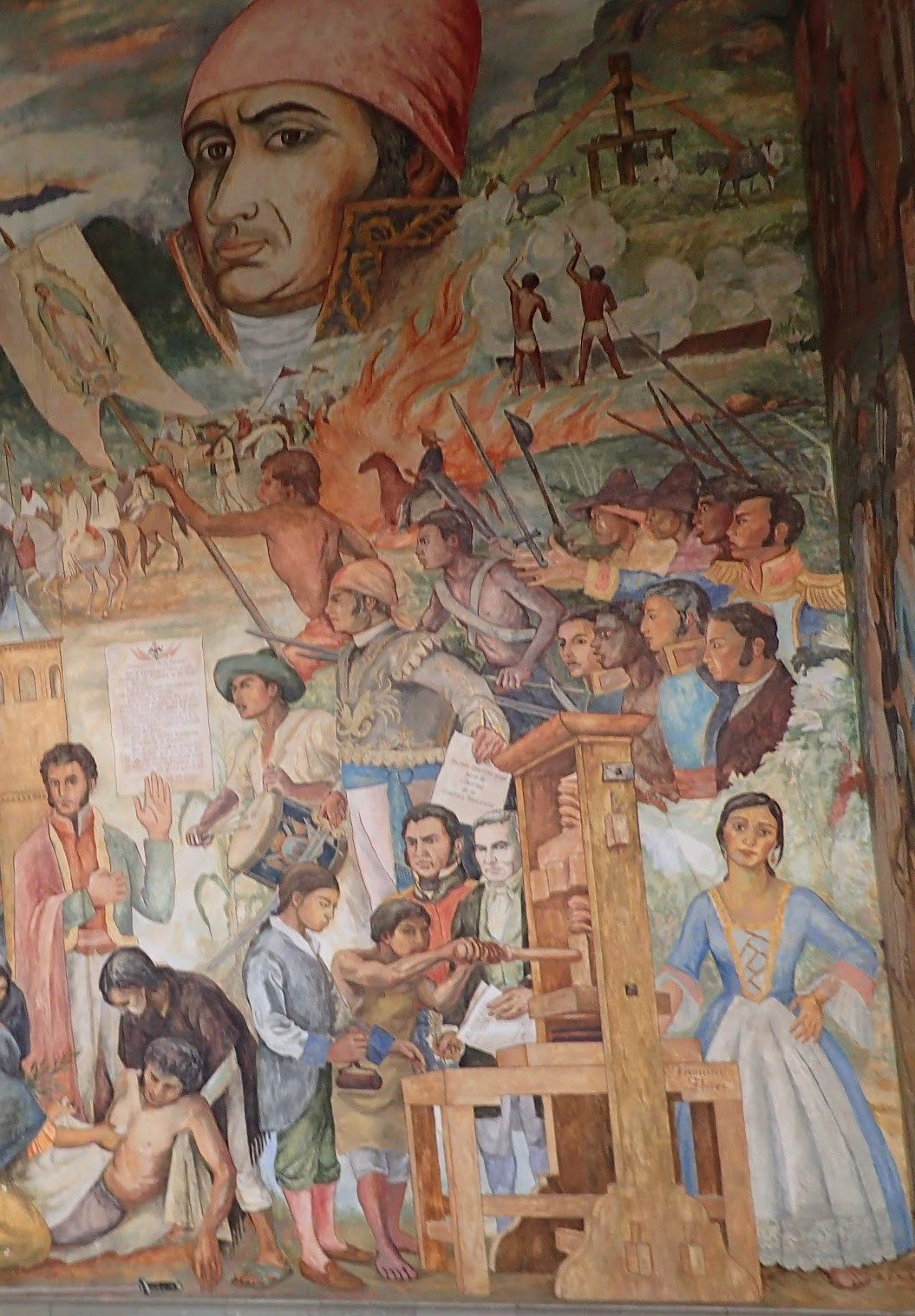
Various Mexican Civil Wars

==== A Collage of War ====
The bottom half of the image above refers to the War of Independence. In the center of the image, the fire of war engulfs bare chested insurgents, suggesting the original mob following Hidalgo. Also engulfed by fire, a man on horseback, below the iconic head of José Morelos, resembles Maximilian in the image below. We will come back to Maximilian below when discussing what is normally called the French Invasion. At the top of the image, we see references to producing sugar at a later period in the Mexican Revolution.

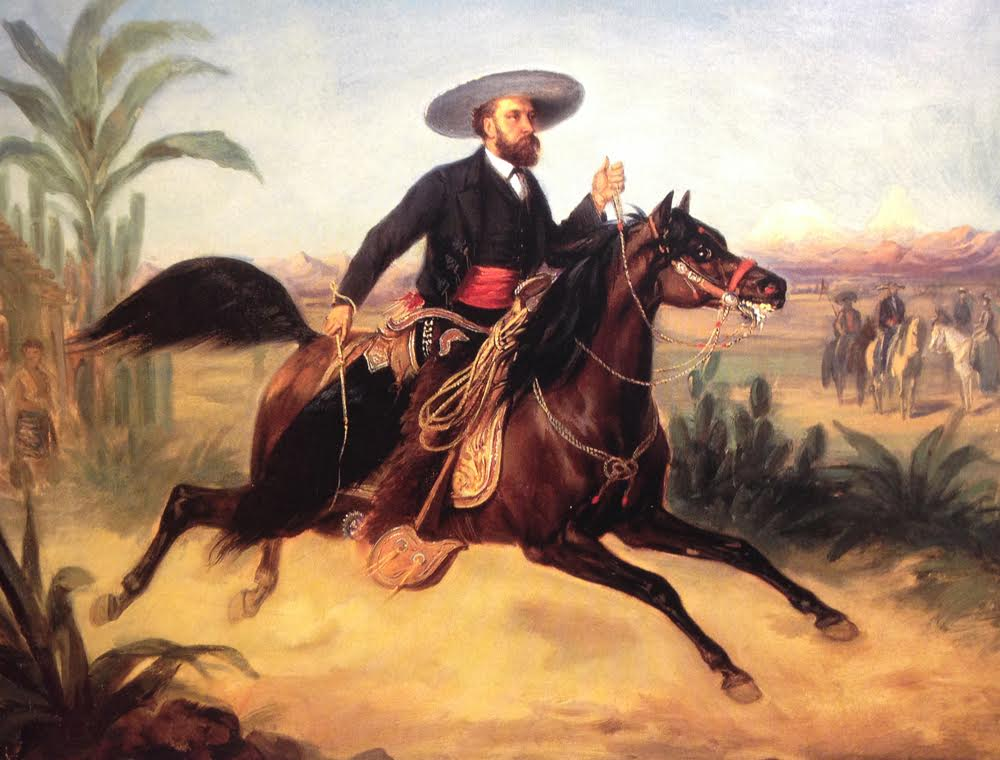
Maximiliano de Habsburgo dressed as a Mexican horseman (Charro) by Karl Martin Ebersberg (1865)

The consistent theme of all five civil wars is liberal-oriented Mexicans versus conservative-oriented Mexicans, with the Catholic Church supporting the conservatives and to some extent, one war led to another. One author has suggested that the 19th century in Mexico was one long civil war. The mural captures this sad truth by blending the wars into one image. And it is easy to understand why people confuse the War of Independence (1810-21) and the Mexican Revolution (1910-1920).

=== 1. The War of Independence (1810–21) ===
As we saw above, the right side of the center panel highlights the War of Independence. Initially it was a rebellion, an insurgency. The idea of independence from Spain developed in time, as we will see below. And of course it started as individual revolts, not as a war.

==== Women in the War of Independence ====
Women play a support role in all wars and of course, that was the case in the War of Independence. Beyond the regular wartime support from women, Leona Vicario financially supported the insurgents. While in Oaxaca, she also contributed to the Correo Americano del Sur. And Bustos placed a woman beside the press that printed that publication. Is she Leona Vicario, or is she a woman from the Colonial period, Francisca Reyes Flores? who brought a printing press to Antequera in 1759.

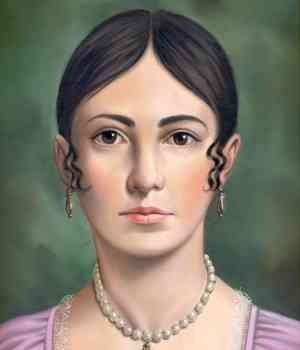
Leona Vicario in her youth

And the artist has identified the press as the one Francisca Reyes Flores brought by inscribing her name in the wood of the press. At first blush, her story does not appear to warrant a place in a panel about independence, reform, and revolution in the 19th century, although the printing press was a factor in the independence movement. However, a recent source identifies the woman in blue as Francisca Reyes Flores.

Also, In 1980, at the inauguration of the mural, guests read a guide to the mural written by Alfredo Cardona Peña, claiming that the image of the woman is Francisca Reyes Flores. Was Peña accurate? Did Garcia Bustos check the wording in the guide?

And neither interpretation of who is the woman explains why the woman in blue appears frustrated.

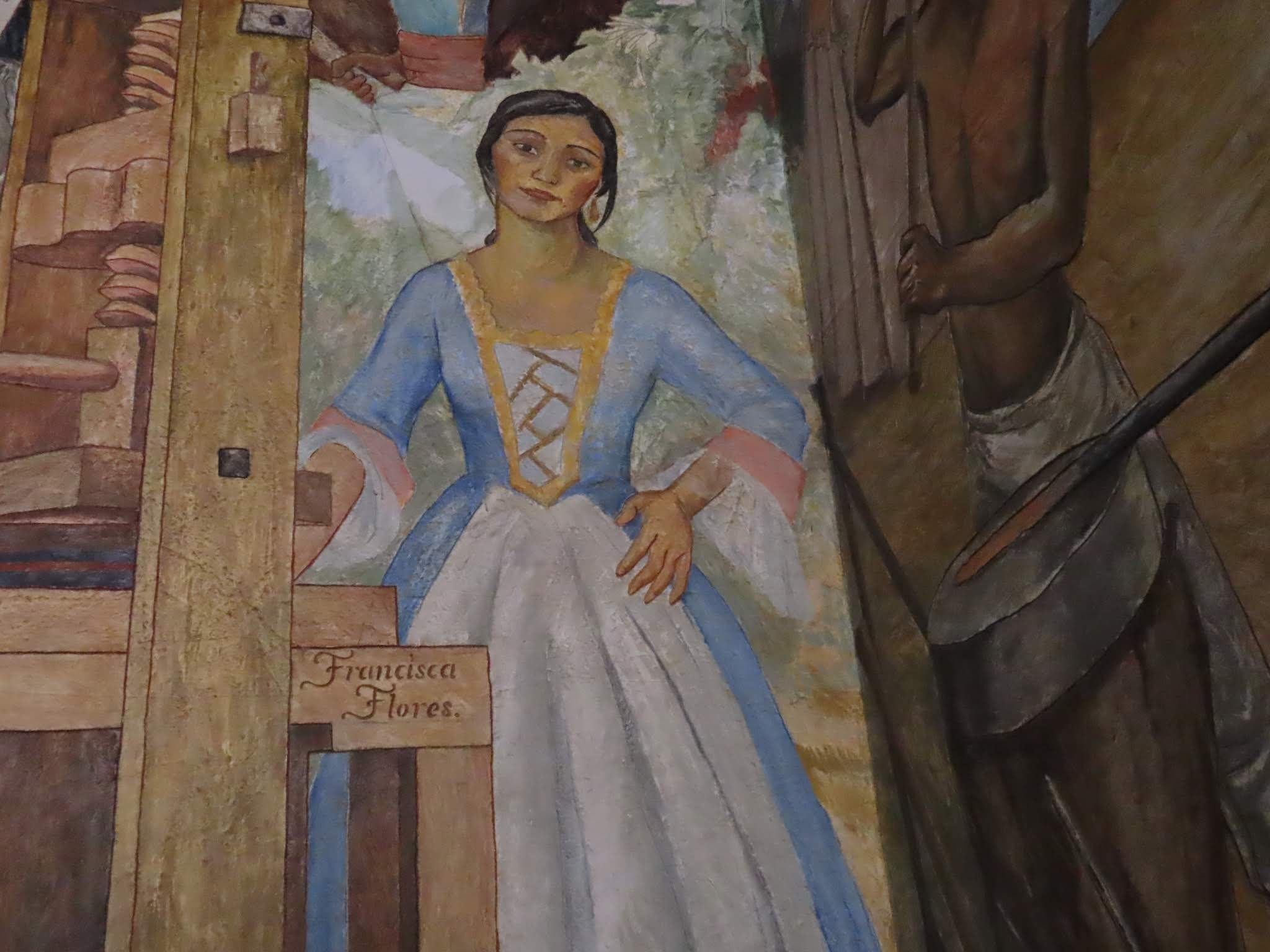
An image of Francisca Reyes Flores or Leona Vicario?

We have learned from the portrayal of other historical characters, that Arturo García Bustos seems to enjoy adding a hidden meanings to the mural. Could the frustrated-looking woman in blue be another layered interpretation by the artist? Is the artist indicating that the philanthropists from the Colonial Period, Francisca Reyes Flores, is frustrated that her gifted printing press is being used to promote independence from Spain?

===== A Militia Fighting for the Conservative Cause =====
For the most part, the mural is about the liberal traditions of Mexico and Oaxaca, however, the image below illustrates a Oaxacan militia on the Royalist side of the War of Independence.

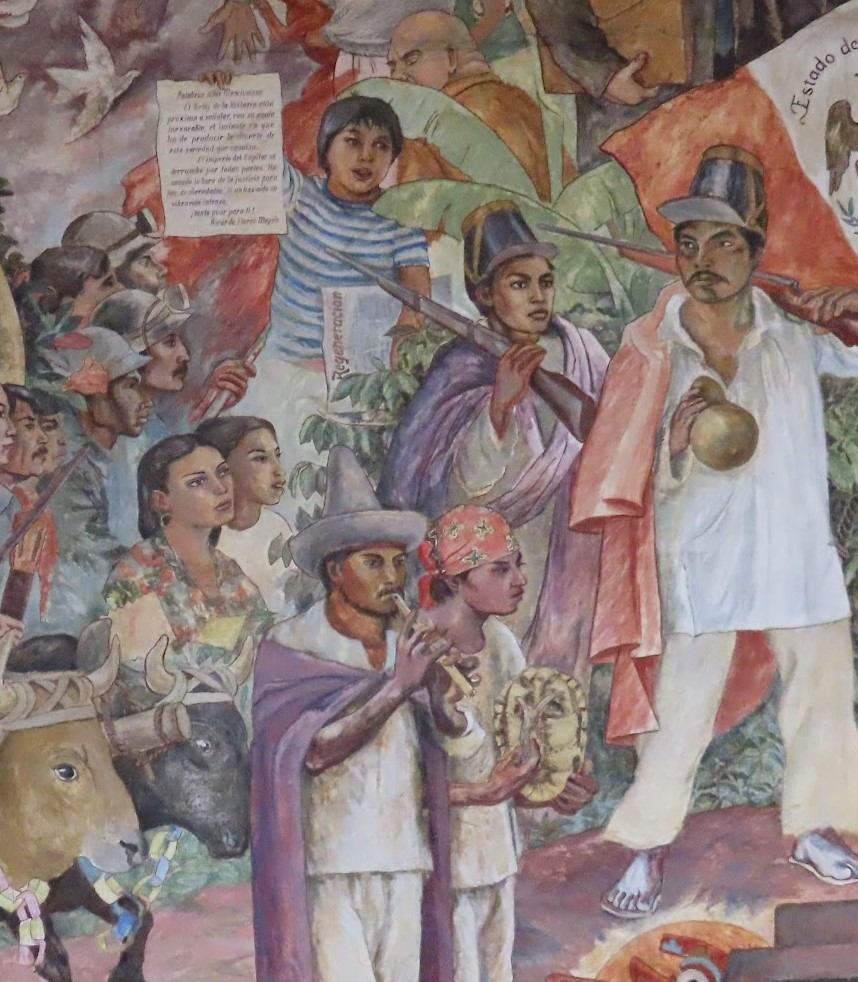
Members of De la Mermelada in purple

Bishop Antonio Bergosa y Jordán, of Antequera, organized the militia. He is better known as a leader in the Inquisition in Mexico. The creation of this militia by the church illustrates the role played by the Catholic Church throughout the 19th century in trying to maintain the status quo for the Conservatives in the five civil wars.

The militia unit was derisively called De la Mermelada. Apparently, at the time of the War of Independence, Oaxacans made colorful marmalade, matching the purple uniforms worn by the militia soldiers in the picture below.

Nevertheless, priests, as we will see below, also played leading roles on the insurgent side.

==== The War of Independence in Oaxaca ====
When the War of Independence opened 18,000 people lived in Oaxaca. They were mostly mestizos (of both Indigenous and European descent). Initially, the local government was staunchly loyal to the Spanish Crown. But there was some support for Independence and it grew. The image below is from the top right corner of the panel. Two elements to note are the bubble-head of José María Morelos y Pavón and below him, the iconic image of the Virgin of Guadeloupe flying from the standard.

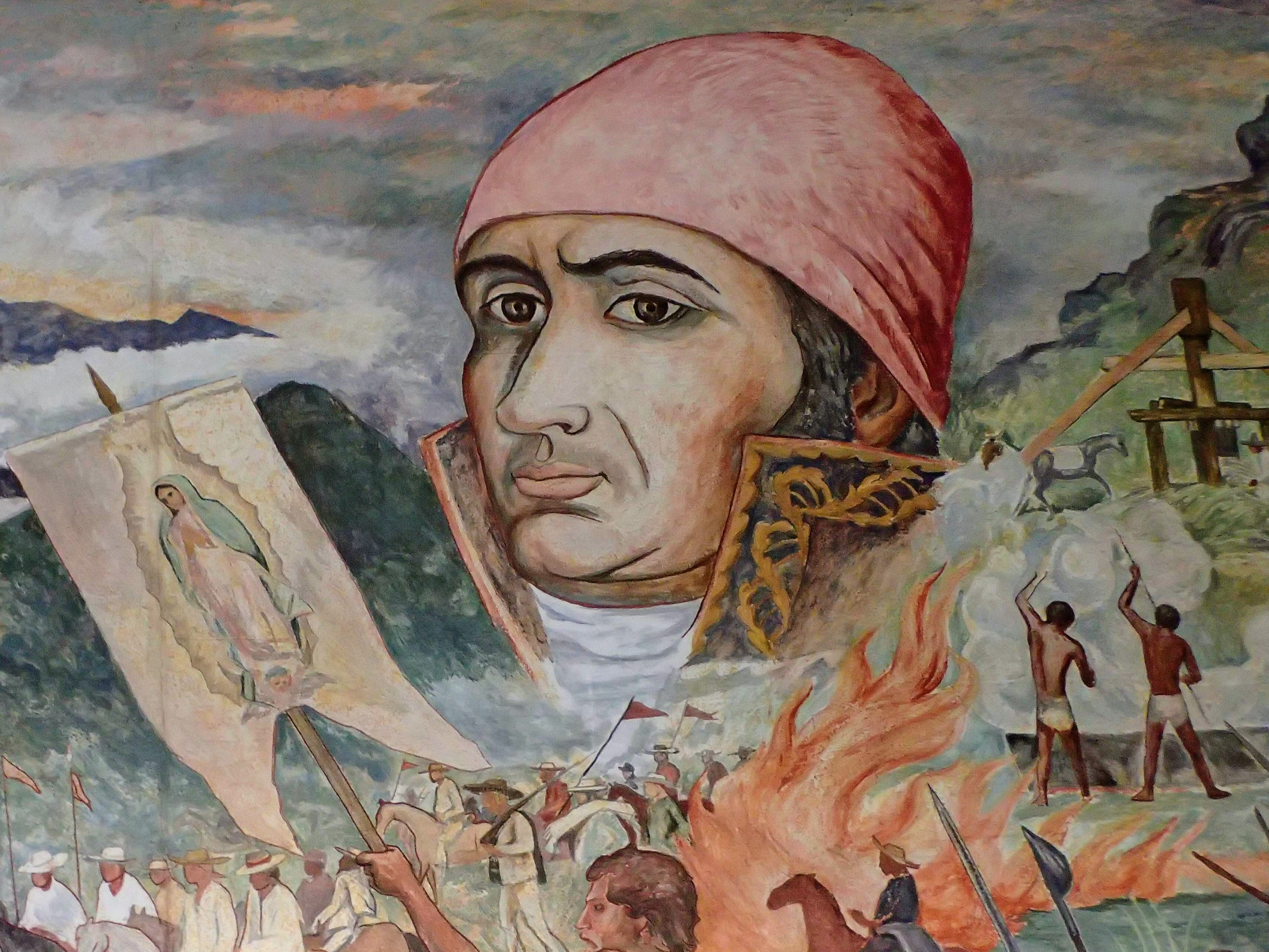
José María Morelos y Pavón a leader of the War of Independence associated with Oaxaca

===== The Virgin of Guadalupe at War =====
A legend from 1810 says that as Hidalgo left his church to give his call-to-arms speech (Grito de Dolores) he grabbed an image of the Virgin of Guadalupe and brandished it during what is reputed to be his famous speech. Unfortunately we do not have a contemporary record of the actual wording or his actions.

In the image above, the standard of the Virgin of Guadeloupe leads attacking insurgents in the pursuit of independence. José-Marie Morelos, credited the Virgin for his military victories. One of the leading insurgents, José Miguel Ramón Adaucto Fernández y Félix took the name of Guadalupe Victoria after a military victory at Oaxaca. (He was also Mexico's first President and in the first 50 years after independence, the only president to serve his full four-year term.) In the Mexican Revolution (1910–21), both sides flew the Virgin as they battled. In 1999, the Catholic Church officially proclaimed her the Patroness of the Americas, the Empress of Latin America, and the Protectress of Unborn Children. Whether or not the story of the Our Lady of Guadalupe and her appearance on is mythical or factual, she remains an important symbol of motherhood for Mexicans.

===== The Prehispanic Origin of the Virgin of Guadalupe =====
Even today, some Mexicans refer to the Virgin of Guadalupe as Tonantzin. Tonantzin was a prehispanic goddess of fertility worshiped at Tepeyac on the spot where the Virgin of Guadalupe is said to have appeared and is now worshiped. In that sense the prehispanic traditions (Tonantzin) and the Christian traditions (The Virgin of Guadalupe) have merged. This process is called Religious Syncretism. It is noteworthy that although the Virgin is said to have appeared in 1531, the popularity of her poignant story did not become well-know until the publication of the legend in Náhuatl in 1649. This leads one to suspect that the story was invented and promoted by the Catholic Church.

===== The Absence of Miguel Hidalgo (1753-1811) in the Mural =====
The initiator of the War of Independence, Miguel Gregorio Antonio Ignacio Hidalgo y Costilla y Gallaga Mandarte Villaseñor does not appear in the mural. Most likely because he was not from Antequera and he never brought the war there. Moreover, in Hidalgo's lifetime, his ideas were strongly opposed by many in Antequera, including Bishop Antonio Bergosa y Jordán.

Hidalgo, more comfortable discussing politics, or provoking a crowd--than leading an army, did enjoy some success initially and incredibly, some 80,000 followed him on his advance to the Battle of Monte de las Cruces, near Mexico City---until they surprisingly retreated.

One author calls the short phase of the rebellion led by Hidalgo and his undisciplined followers, "amateurish and unambitious". Hidalgo was the leader for only some eight months of an 11-year war, although myth-makers rendered him the Father of Mexico. . After the death of independence leaders Hidalgo and Allende, José María Morelos, also a priest but a man with practical smarts as a former mule train teamster, along with Ignacio López Rayón, led the insurgents in the War of Independence. Morelos and insurgents pictured below captured Antequera (Oaxaca) in 1812.

Hidalgo is said to have started the War of Independence with his Grito (Cry of Dolores) on 16 September 1810. We do not know exactly what he said but it seems clear that he decried bad government and did not declare independence from Spain. He is said to have called for death to the "Gachupines", a slang term for "Peninsulares", or New Spain residents born in Spain and now dominating New Spain.

===== The role of priests in the War of Independence =====
One historian, respected by many but not all, claims that 400 priests supported the Insurgents in the War of Independence. The reasons for priests leading the war is first of all because they were the leaders of the society at the time and secondly they personally, including Miguel Hidalgo, had suffered financially when the French (Bourbon) administration in Spain had imposed ruinous financial policies to pay for the war with England. A third explanation for priests leading the War of Independence is that the ideas behind the French Revolution circulated in seminaries were priests were educated.

Generally the War of Independence was supported by parish priests who were born in Mexico either Criollo people, generally with two Spanish parents like Hidalgo, or priest with mixed racial lineage -- Mestizos like José Morelos. On the other hand, the high level priest, born in Spain (called (Peninsulares or Gachupines) like Bishop of Antequera, Antonio Bergosa y Jordán opposed independence.

==== José María Morelos Pérez y Pavón (1765-1815) and Democratic Ideas ====
Morelos wears a red bandana in two images in the mural. Some suggest that the bandana mitigated his migraines. Red headgear also connotes a "bonnet rouge" or Phrygian cap which has been associated with many liberal insurgent movements. While in Oaxaca, Morelos developed his thoughts about independence, justice and the future of Mexico, resulting in a constitutional document, called Sentimientos de la Nación. In the image below, he holds a copy of the Constitution of Apatzingán. (The official title as indicated in the mural is Decreto Constitucional para la Libertad de la América Mexicana. Or in English, Decree for the Freedom of Mexican America.)

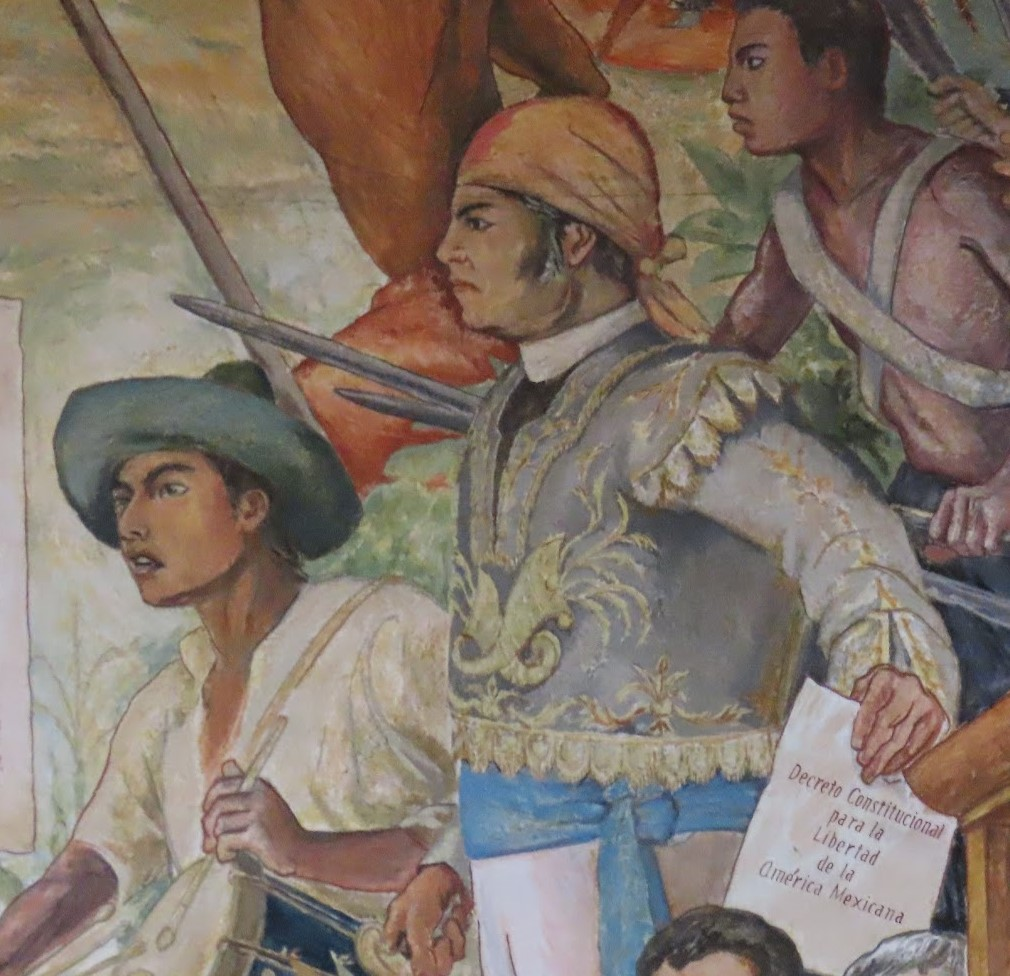
Morelos holding a copy of the constitutional document dictated in Oaxaca.

Apparently, the initial claim for Mexican independence was written in Antequera. A commemorative plaque, posted in the Zócalo of Oaxaca just north and west of the Palacio de Gobierno, proclaims that, Morelos sowed the seeds of Mexican democracy in Oaxaca during the War of Independence. He was also the first rebel leader to declare independence from Spain.

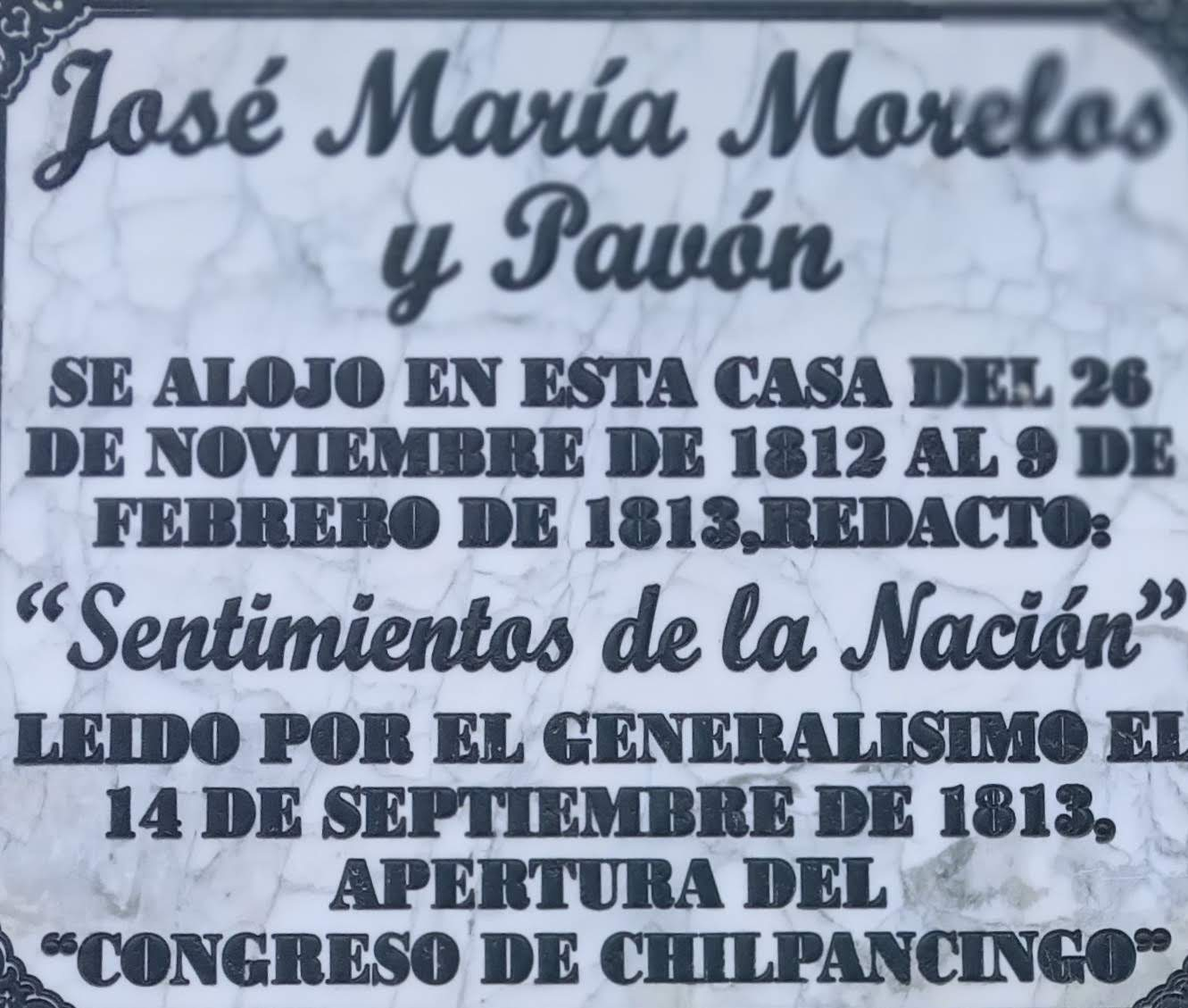
A sign in the Zócalo of Oaxaca indicating that Morelos generated important thoughts there

==== Vicente Ramón Guerrero Saldaña (1782–1831) ====
The image below of Vicente Guerrero replicates one of the most famous paintings of him. However other images exist of Guerrero that are less "whitewashed". And one should not assume that the images by Arturo García Bustos, like other images of historical characters painted by Bustos, are true representations of what a photograph, if one existed, would reveal. However, the images used in the mural closely reflect popular depictions of the history maker, Vicente Guerrero. By reflecting popular, if inaccurate images of his subjects, Garcia Bustos clearly communicates, in almost all cases who he is depicting on the mural. He does or may, however perpetual inaccurate mythical interpretations.

The image below of Guerrero bears little resemblance to many that have been produced over the years, but one wonders if it is more accurate. But of course we do not know.

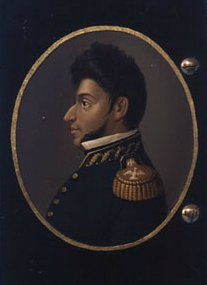
Profile portrait of Vicente Guerrero on an early 19th-century snuffbox

Guerrero's father was Afro-Mexican and his mother indigenous, making Vicente Guerrero, Mexico's only afro-mestizo president--for less than a year in 1829. During the War of Independence, Guerrero became a military leader, and he was one of the few to escape execution during the war. After the war, in 1831, he was executed at Cuilápam de Guerrero, just 10 kilometers from Oaxaca. Some sources indicate that he was tried in the city of Oaxaca and shuffled off to Cuilápam for execution.

Afro-Mexicans played an important role in the War of Independence. Below, in a scene from the mural, President Vicente Guerrero points out a proclamation abolishing slavery on 16 September 1829, one of his crowning achievements. Slavery formally ended in 1837 in Mexico.

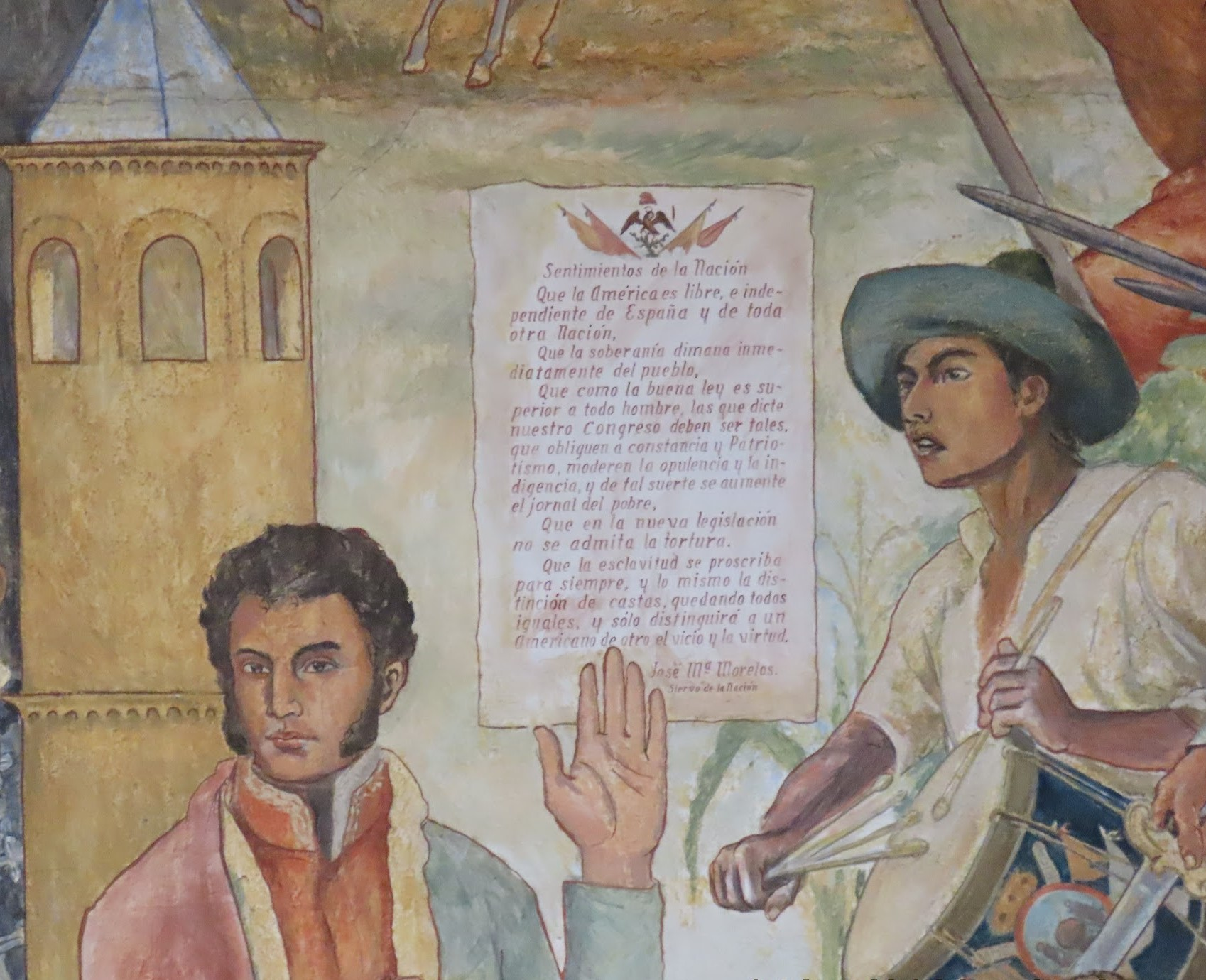
Vicente Guerrero with a proclamation abolishing slavery

Note that in the image above that the tower behind Guerrero bears a strong resemblance to those of the never-completed Ex-monastery of Santiago in Cuilapan de Guerrero where Guerrero was executed.

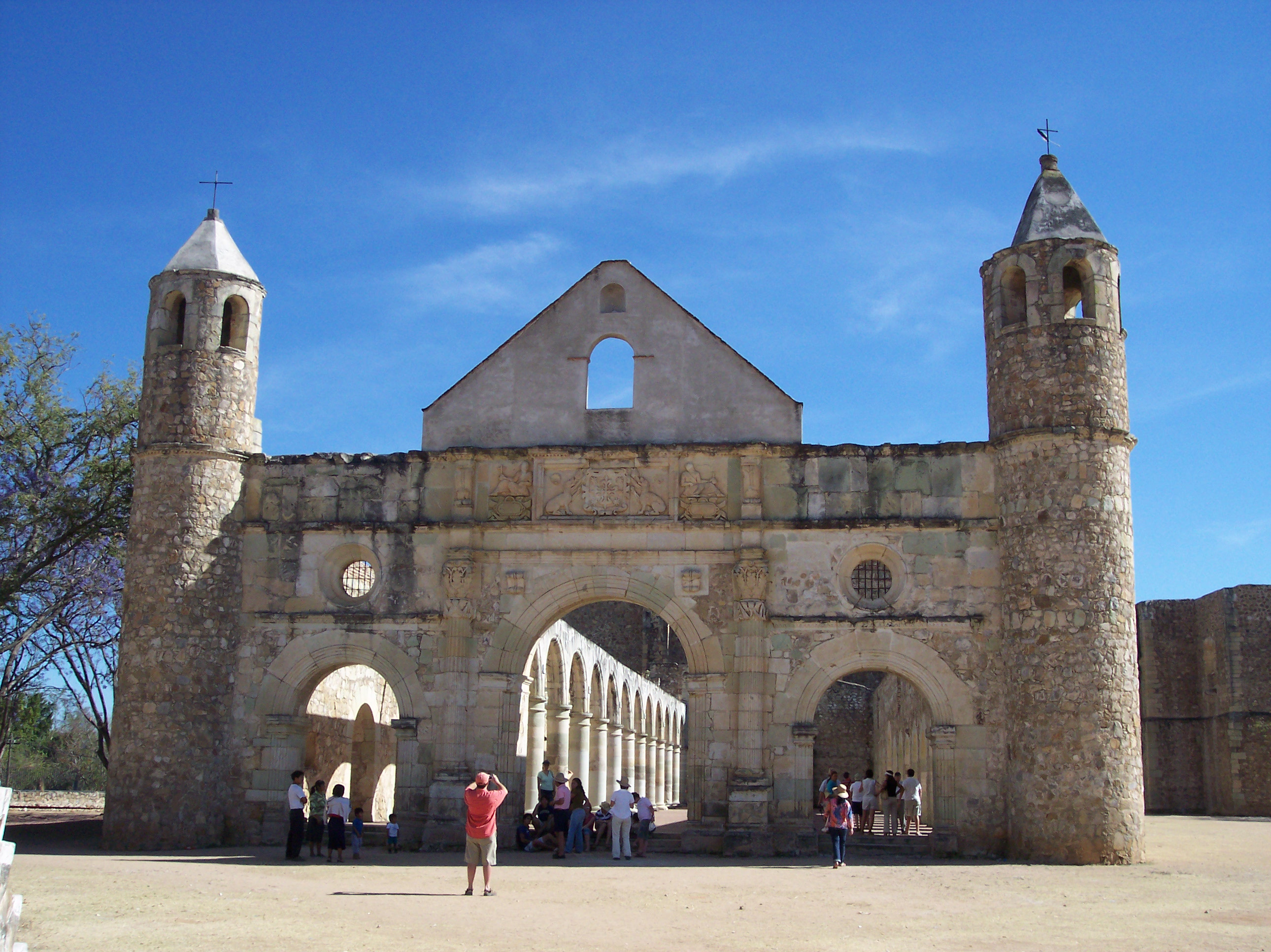
Convent of Santiago in Cuilapan de Guerrero

==== Insurgents depicted on the mural ====
In the bottom left corner of the middle panel, García Bustos placed, among other elements, insurgents associated with the War of Independence in Oaxaca. Many of the depictions of insurgents resemble images available on the internet so most insurgents can be identified. But not all are easy to identify. In cases of doubt, it is assumed that the images are of local heroes because the artist's stated goal is to depict people who frequented the Palacio de Gobierno. One government publication claims that the images are "Matamoros, Allende, and Galena." But Allende and Galena, while they are important insurgents, they are not associated with the history of Oaxaca.

Those insurgents who battled locally are remembered in Oaxaca and other Mexican towns where streets bear their names and commemorate their roles in Mexico gaining independence. (It is said that at least 14,000 streets in Mexico are named after Miguel Hidalgo.) Little recognition is given to conservative leaders in street-naming or the mural. There is, however, one image on the mural of the Royalists who defended the city against the insurgents and held the city longer than the 15 months that insurgents held it. We will look at it below.

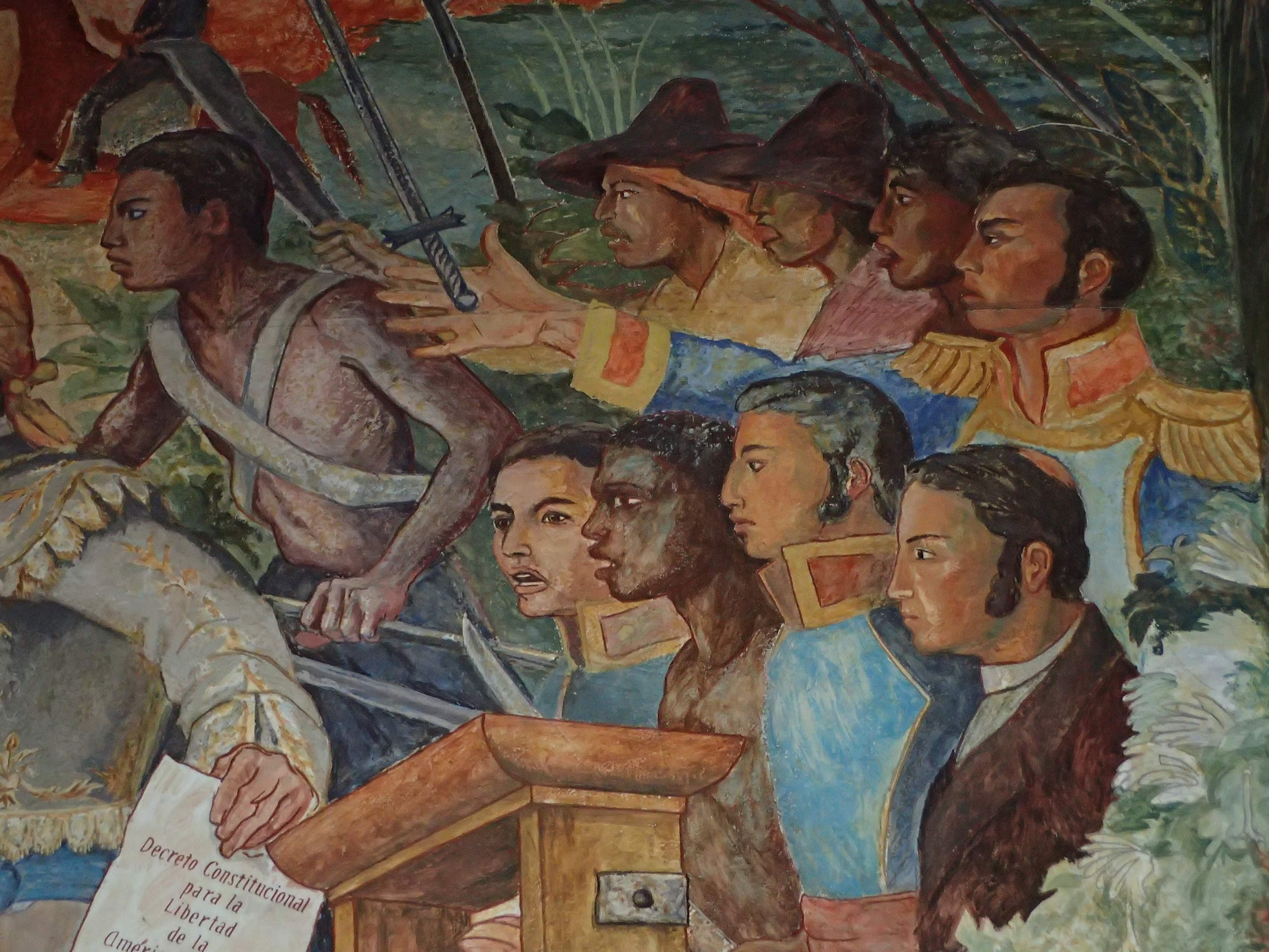
Insurgents of the Mexican War of Independence

===== Armenta and Lopez =====
Two insurgents, apparently the two at the back wearing hats typical of mule drivers, are celebrated in Oaxaca in the street Armenta y López, located near the Palacio de Gobierno. José María Armenta was a mulero, (a mule skinner or mule driver) when Miguel Hidalgo gave him the rank of colonel and sent him to Antequera (Oaxaca) to foment rebellion. López took Miguel Armenta de Lima as his lieutenant. Their story illustrates some of the complexities and tragedy of one of the five civil wars fought in Oaxaca.

When they arrived in Antequera, locals were suspicious of the two men, but the two were able to convince Antequera authorities that they were selling firewood. One story is that they had learned that the mayor was a Creole and they assumed that he, like many other Creoles, including themselves, was a supporter of the rebellion. When the insurgents told the mayor their intentions to start a revolution, he threw them in jail.

After a trial, they were hanged in the quarries of Jalatlaco. Their bodies were dismembered and strewn on the road to Etla as a warning to other potential insurgents. Obviously, the colonial authorities who were in control of Antequera in 1811, meant business. After José Morelos captured the city in 1812, he ordered that the remains of insurgents who had been martyred, Miguel López de Lima, José María Armenta, Felipe Tinoco y José María Palacios, be exhumed. Subsequently, they were celebrated in the cathedral as heroes.

===== Guadalupe Victoria (1786-1843) =====
García Bustos tells us that he included Guadalupe Victoria in the mural. Keeping with his realism approach, and depicting a legend, the artist pictures Guadalupe Victoria, the first President of the United States of Mexico, throwing his sword to lead his men forward, as his legend accounts, in the taking of Oaxaca in 1812. As the first President of Mexico (1824–1829), he served his entire term, which did not happen until the presidency of Benito Juárez who became president for a full term in 1858.

===== Tinoco and Palacios =====
Felipe Tinoco and Catarino Palacio were martyrs in the War of Independence but do not appear on the mural. They are mentioned here to illustrate the strong opposition to independence that permeated Antequera, especially in the early stages of the War. In 1811, Tinoco and Palacio met with a group of priests in the Convent of the Conception and made preliminary plans for an insurrection. They were captured and held in a prison at the present location of the Panaderia Bamby. The two young insurgents were shot by a firing squad, beheaded, dismembered and their heads were placed in metal cages at the edge of the city of Antequera. These gory details emphasize the risks that anyone took when they decided to support the War of Independence and illustrate the fear that authorities tried to sow in the minds of possible insurgents.

===== Valerio Trujano (1767-1812) =====
In the image above of the group of insurgents, Valerio Trujano could be the soldier on the priest's right. His grey hair is a clue. In 1811, at the age of 44, Valerio Trujano, a former mule driver, joined the rebels, led guerilla action against Spanish forces and won several important victories. Besieged at Huajuapan de León, 170 kilometers from Antequera, Trujano held out for 111 days, resisting 15 assaults, until he received reinforcements sent by the revolutionary leader José María Morelos. With the help of the extra troops, Trujano won the battle of Huajuapan, on 13 July 1812. When the royalists retreated, they abandoned 30 cannons, over 2,000 rifles, and ammunition, and left 400 dead, and more than three hundred prisoners. And the insurgents were gaining control of the Antequera area.

Later, in a battle in the state of Puebla, Trujano, with only one hundred men, faced four hundred royalists. During the retreat Trujano's son Gil was taken prisoner. Valerio Trujano escaped and, while attempting to rescue his son, he was killed on 7 October 1812.

===== Afro-Mexicanos =====
In the mural, two Afro-Mexicans stand among the celebrated insurgent leaders, one in the front row, one in the back. The message seems to be that afro-Mexicans, possibly former slaves, supported the rebels.

===== Carlos María de Bustamante (1774-1848) =====
García Bustos tells us that he included Bustamante in the mural. Bustamante was a prolific writer and insurgent born in Antequera. There is an image of him with his printing press and holding a copy of El Correo del Sur. This publication was a mouthpiece to promote independence from Spain. He later wrote volumes of history about the War of Independence, thus creating stories that were not lost and helped to immortalize insurgent leaders discussed here. Bustamante's washed-out appearance, drab colors could be García Bustos ‘way of reminding us that Carlos Bustamante spent a large block of time in jail.

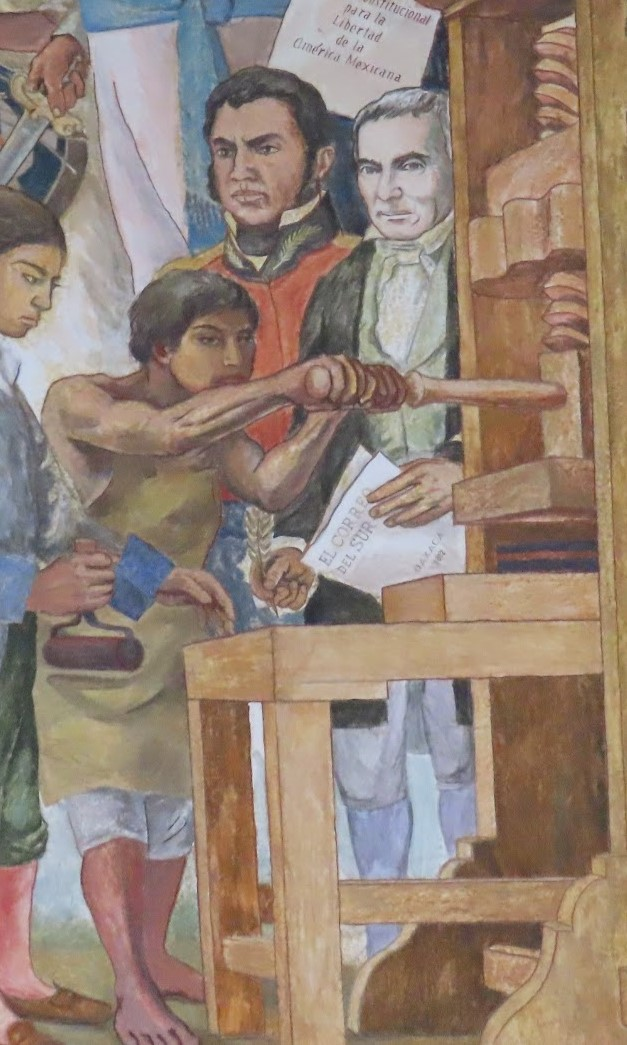
Carlos María de Bustamante with a copy of El Correo del Sur

General Antonio de Leon

In the picture above, one resource suggests General Antonio de León stands beside the gray-skinned Carlos María de Bustamante. De León was a famous son of Oaxaca born in Huajuapan de León, Oaxaca and in 1821 he funded and led an army that liberated the city of Oaxaca from Spanish rule. He was a governor of Oaxaca and also commanded the military in Oaxaca. In 1847 he valiantly led Mexican troops against the much stronger American invaders in the Battle of Molino del Rey, near Mexico City. He was killed and the victorious Americans advanced on Mexico City and won the war.

The picture below, labeled Antonio de León, does look like the man beside Bustamante. Another image below, a statue in front of Oaxaca's cathedral, points out the importance of de Leon.

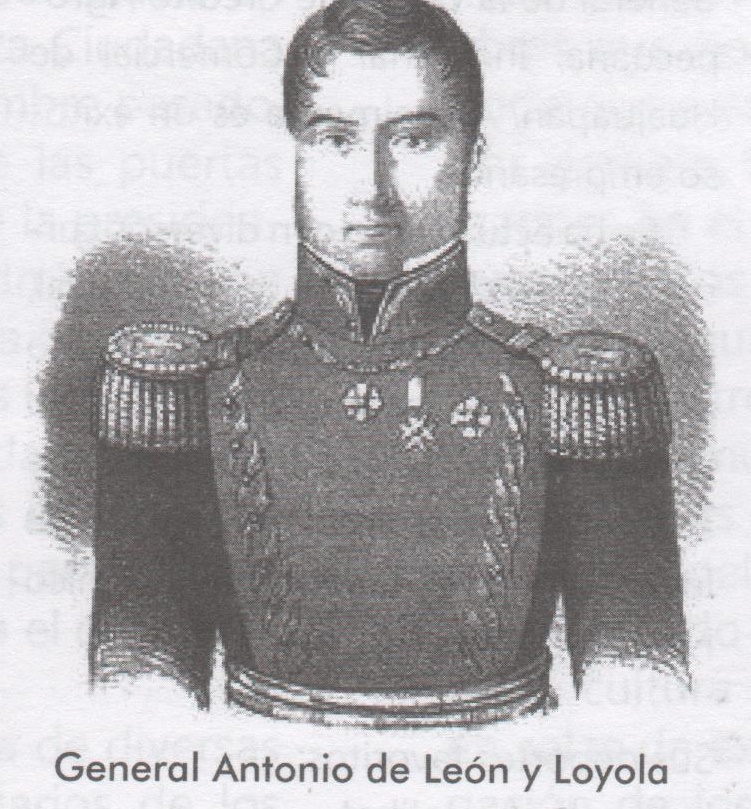
Image of General Antonio de Léon y Loyola that does not look like the mural

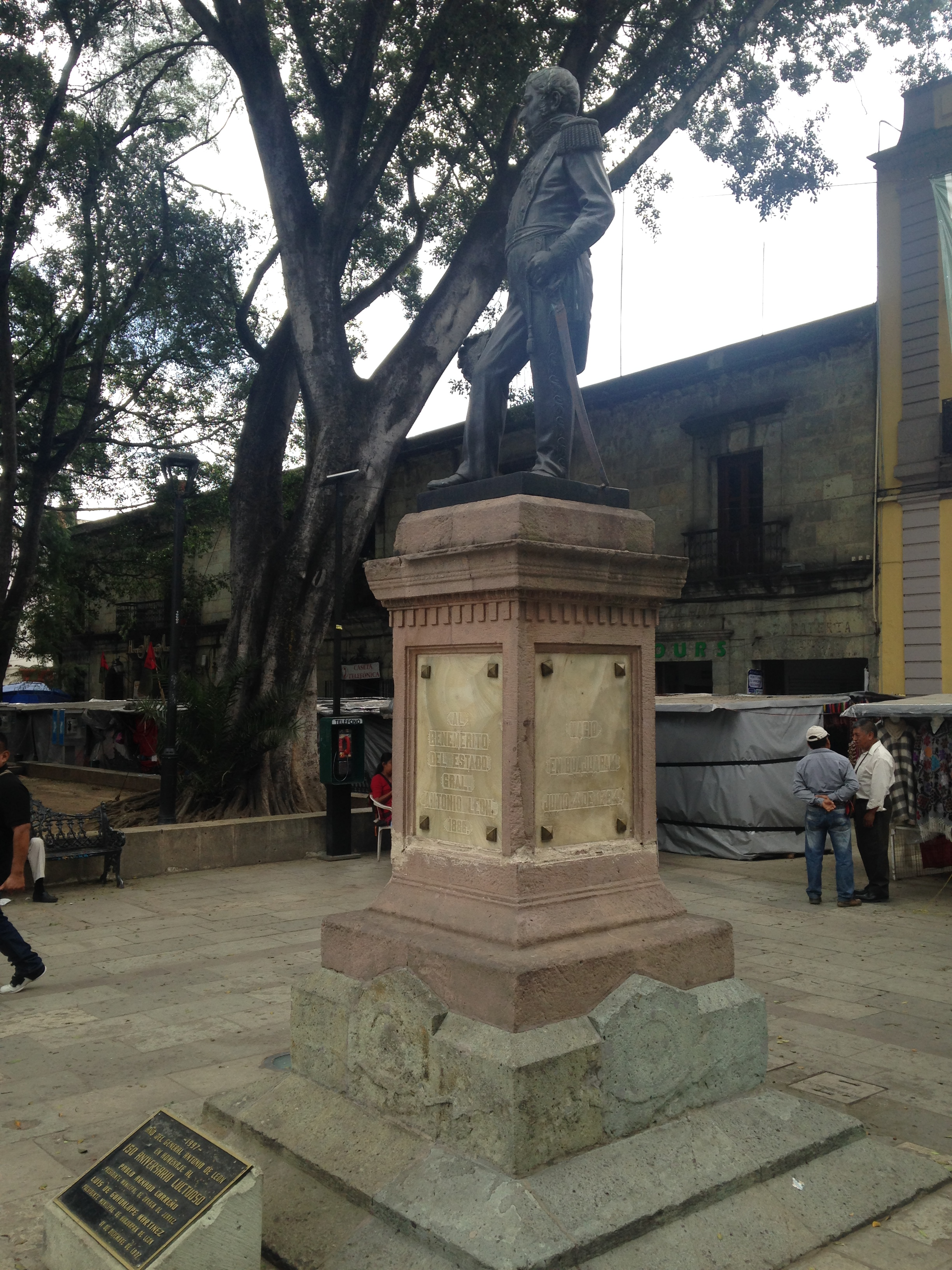
Antonio de Léon, a statue in front of Oaxaca's cathedral,

On another note, we have an image of Antonio de León in the foreground of a sumptuous banquet. An interesting insight into how the upper class lived in 19th century Mexico and probably Oaxaca.

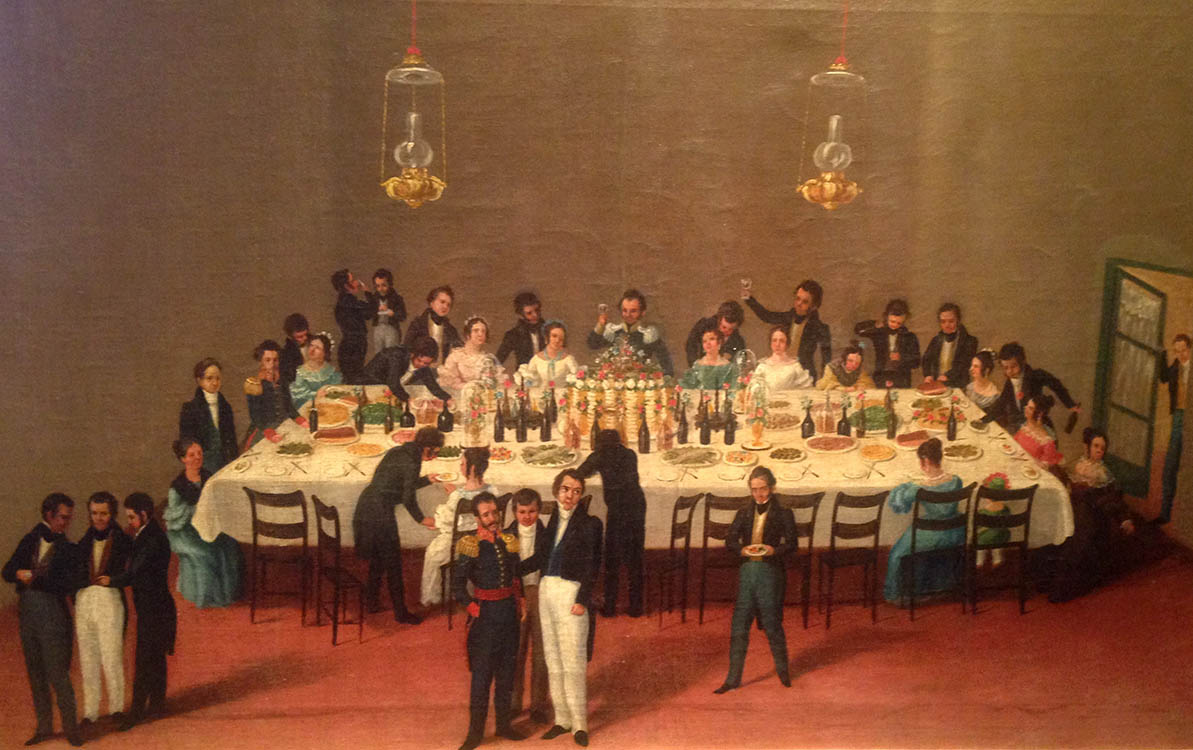
A banquet with Antonio de León in the foreground

===== Manuel Sabino Crespo (1778-1814) =====
Crespo, like insurgents Morelos and Matamoros was a priest. He was a leader in the War of Independence, and a Oaxacan street is named after him.. Crespo is most likely the priest in the image of insurgents, although another source, including the description of the mural published for the inauguration of the mural indicate that the priest is Mariano Matamoros y Guridi.

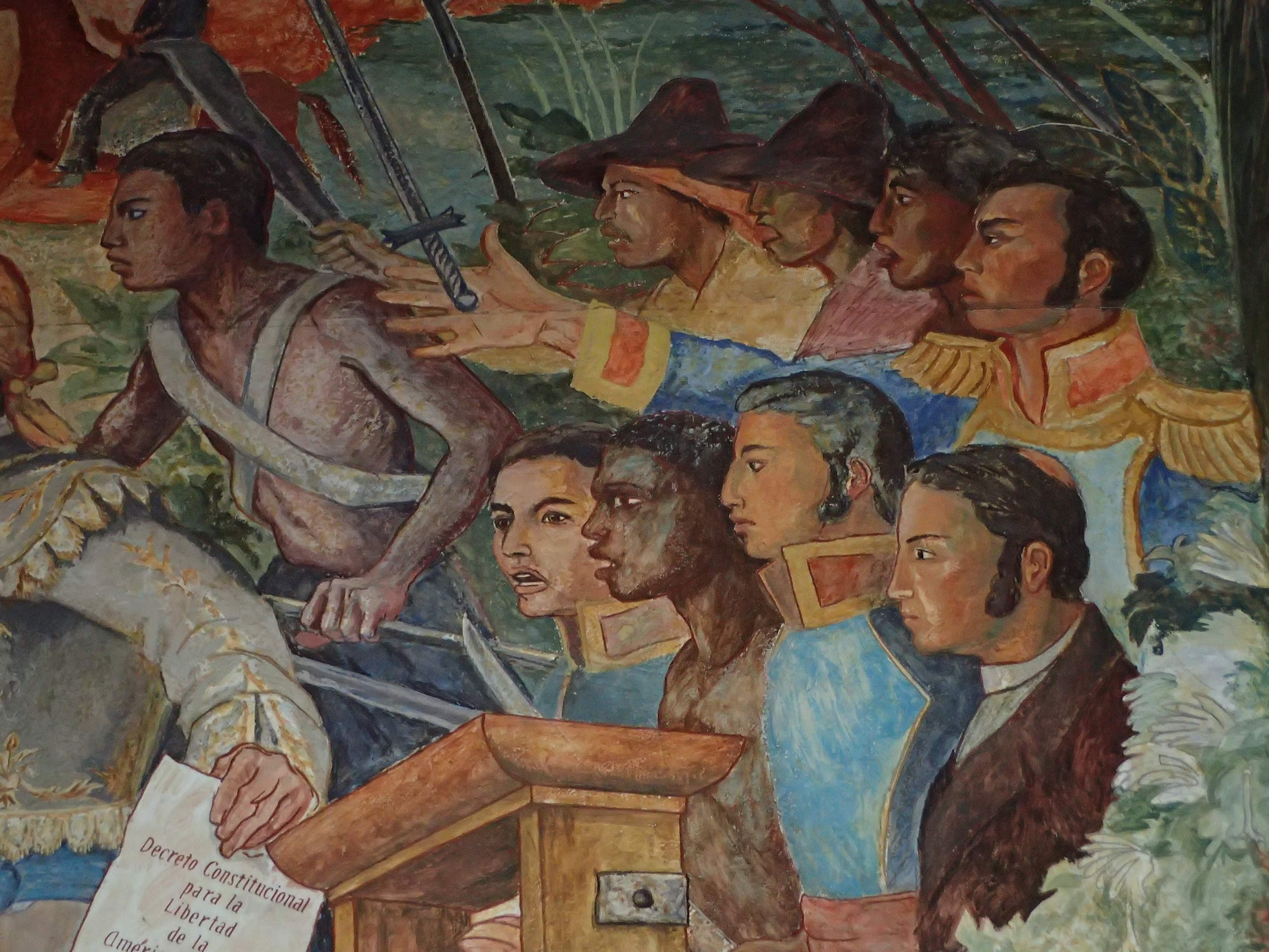
Insurgents of the Mexican War of Independence. The priest is probably Manuel Sabino Crespo

However, the image on the mural closely resembles a statue of Crespo in the town of Ejutla de Crespo suggesting that this statue of Crespo is the model for the priest in the mural. Or vice versa. Although he was a priest in the small community of San Mateo Rio Hondo, 130 km from Antequera on the road to Huatulco, he was also a professor at the seminary school of the Holy Cross of Antequera. He joined the insurgent movement when José María Morelos and others we have mentioned, carried out the capture of Antequera in 1812. In September 1813, he participated in the Congress of Anahuac as a substitute for José María Murguía y Galardi, representing the province of Oaxaca.

During the war, a civil war, there were plenty of heated discussions and Crespo participated in them, especially in the Cathedral of Antequera. In 1813 Crespo argued that the insurgents should be allowed to receive the Catholic sacraments. It appears that Crespo did not fight in battles as a soldier, although he was wounded in 1814 in a loyalist attack in which 200 insurgents died.

When he was captured in 1814, the Bishop of Antequera, Antonio Bergosa y Jordán, recommended that Sabino Crespo be beheaded. Instead he was executed by firing squad on 14 October 1814.

===== General Manuel Mier y Terán (1789-1832) =====
As explained above, a large percentage of the insurgent heros were executed. Arturo García Bustos does not illustrate executions on the mural or other forms of death but in the image below, he shows a suicide, the result of General Manuel Mier y Terán, who helped lead the assault on Oaxaca, "falling on his sword" after his troops were defeated in another military exercise in 1832. The sword appears at the bottom of te image as does a skull on the extreme left. The skull represents Mictlāntēcutli, the god of death, for the Aztecs and called Kedo by the Zapotecs.

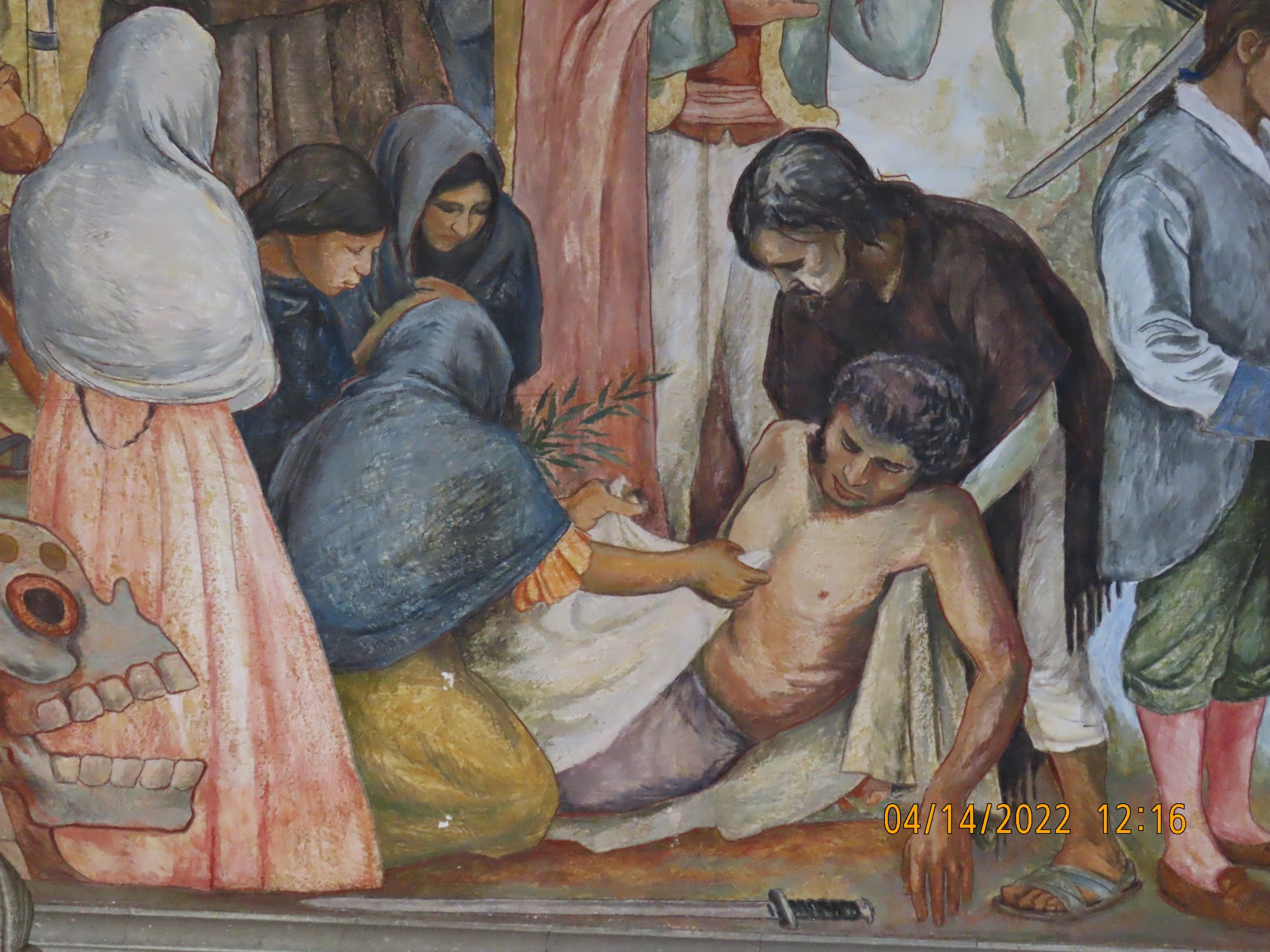
General Manuel Mier y Terán has "fallen on his sword to kill himself

Summing up the scene above, and putting it into a larger context, the image below reflects the arc of life starting on the left with the god of life Ehécatl, moving to the middle with three generations of women who maintain life, refreshed by a flowing stream, and ending with Mictlāntēcutli, the god of death. The mother with her child is celebrating her ancestors with cempasúchil flowers, technically called Tagetes erecta or Marigolds in English. The grandmother in the back supports the mother and child. Generally speaking to the left of the image below, the mural highlights reform and to the right we have images mostly from the War of Independence.

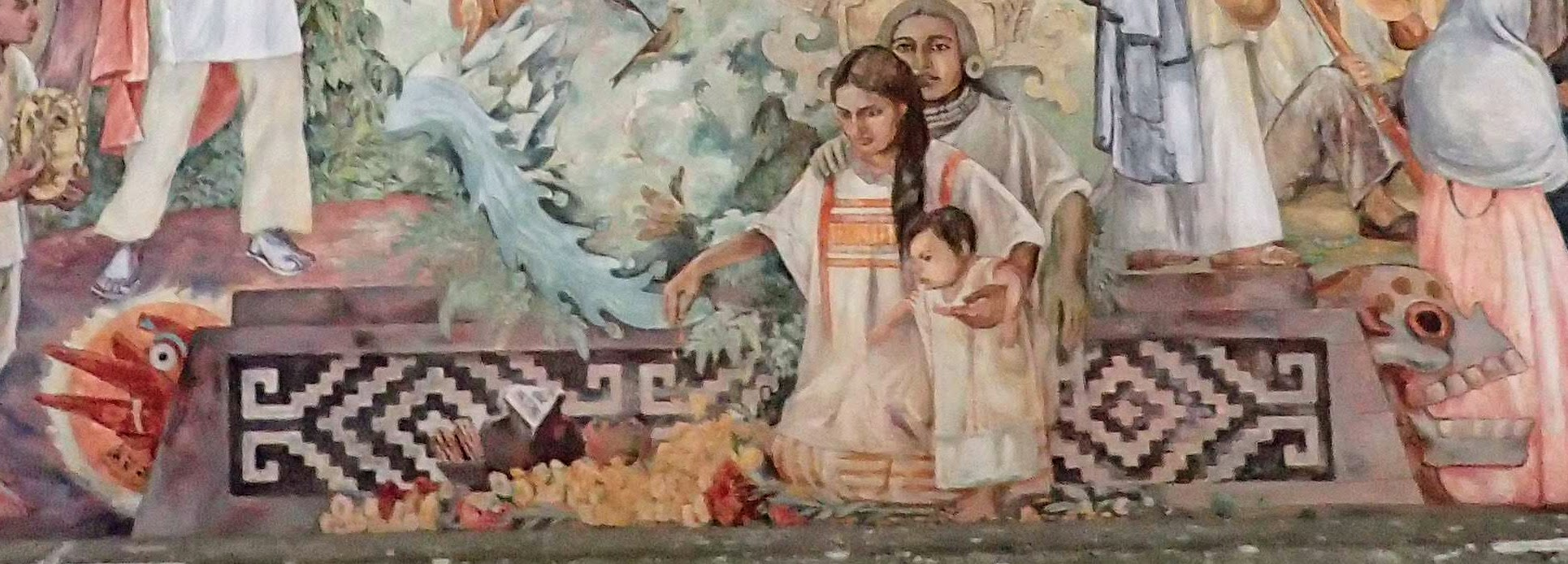
On the left, the bird with two beaks, Ehécatl, symbolizes life, and on the extreme right, the skull symbolizes Kedo, the god of death.

=== The Mexican - American War (1846-48) ===
The Mexican-American war pitted experienced American soldiers against Mexican soldiers and in that sense it was not a civil war, like the other wars depicted here. Nor does it seem to appear on the mural, directly, perhaps because the Americans did not advance on Oaxaca. However, Oaxacans like Porfirio Díaz joined the military to defend Oaxaca when the Americans were moving in the direction of Oaxaca and after the Mexican-American War a teenaged Díaz decide to pursue a military career and eventually became a major Caudillo in the history of Oaxaca and Mexico.

Although battles of the Mexican American War were not fought on Oaxacan soil, in 1846, Oaxacan mitla members did walk walk 300 miles to battle the Americans at Molina del Rey, near Mexico City. Some 200 to 300 Oaxacans were captured, wounded or killed and tragically, Governor Antonio de León, who led the Oaxacan troops, died in battle. Upon his death Benito Juárez, his assistant became acting governor.

Also, Santa Anna, who led the Mexican troops and was a dictator during the war, appears on the mural in the form of his prosthetic leg. More about that later.

Santa Anna retreating from losses in 1848 and wanting to regroup in Oaxaca, Santa Anna asked for permission and Juárez, the Governor of Oaxaca, refused Santa Anna entry into Oaxaca. Santa Anna considered this a hostile gesture and he never forgot it. When Santa Anna regained power as president after the war, Juárez decided to exile himself to New Orleans in 1853 when threatened by Santa Anna.. More about Santa Anna below.

=== War of Reform (1857-60) ===
The War of Reform was a civil war growing out of Conservative reaction to progressive laws known as La Reforma passed by Liberals, initially led by Ignacio Comonfort and later by Juan Álvarez and Benito Juárez. Initially Oaxaca supported the Conservative side. The Liberal defeated the Conservatives and implemented reform legislation that began in 1854 with the Plan de Ayutla, calling for the removal of the dictator Santa Anna, leading to the Ley Juárez legislation that abolished the Fueros granting special legal and financial privileges to the Catholic Church. In Oaxaca, however, the lines between Conservatives and Liberals were not always clearly drawn. In 1857 the congress, passed a liberal, federalist constitution limiting the power of the church and the military.

==== A Surprise Guest ====
As we saw with the shaman in prehispanic panel that looks like the artist of the mural, and an image of a woman on the colonial panel that resembles his wife Rina Lazo, the artist does not hesitate to include family members in the mural and in that sense make the mural his personal story as well as the story of Oaxaca and Mexico. The soldier below depicts Nicolas Bustos, the great-grandfather of Arturo García Bustos. The artist credits this ancestor as the source of his liberal thinking.

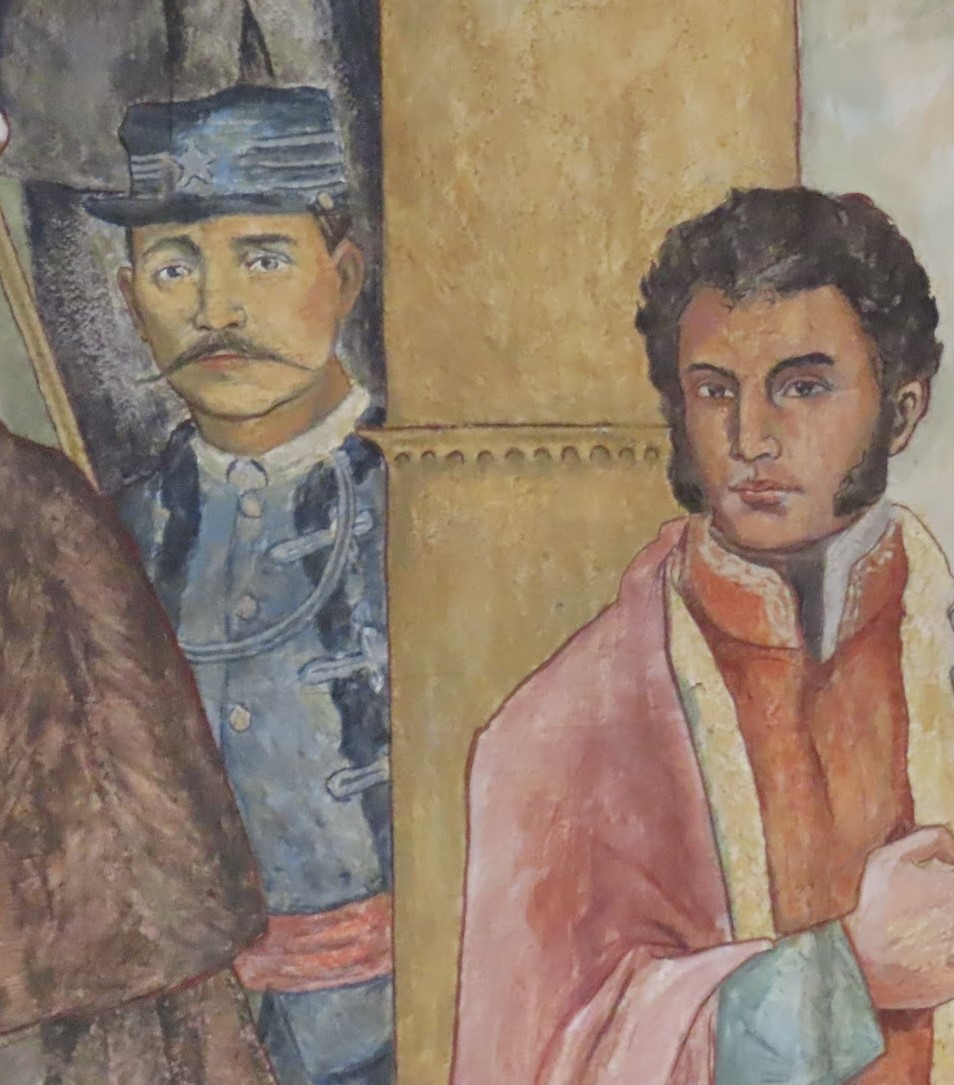

=== 3. The First and Second French Interventions, (1838-39) and (1861–67) ===
The first French Invasion is also called the Pastry War (1838–39) and was a minor skirmish in which French citizen tried to recover their commercial losses due to chaos that followed the independence of Mexico. And it was a harbinger of something much bigger. In the Pastry War, the French attackers were subdued by Santa Anna. He considered himself a war hero after this and behaved recklessly.

The Second French intervention in Mexico was a major war by European powers, initially France, England and Spain and later only France, started the war to recover debts owed by Mexico and later to install a regime in Mexico favourable to France. It was a civil war like the other wars discussed here pitting Mexican conservatives and Mexicans who served in the invading army against Mexican liberals and Mexican soldiers who supported them. In that sense the Second French Invasion represents a continuation of the War of Reform and the War of Independence, over a period of more than 50 years.

Oaxacan women during the Second French Intervention

Oaxacan women accompanied their men to battle. Tragically 475 were killed in 1862 at San Andrés Chalcomula, Puebla when 80 quintals of gunpowder and more than a thousand grenades exploded, killing 475 Oaxacan women, and 1,017 Oaxacan soldiers. Women of Oaxaca also suffered from repression, threats and harassment under French occupation. tOn 3 February 1860, with the French occupying Oaxaca, women accused of sympathizing with the liberal cause had their heads shaved, were stripped bare in the streets, and mistreated by soldiers. On other occasions, many women were arrested and imprisoned. In 1862, the women of Oaxaca formed an organization to raise funds to provide medical services and blankets to soldiers.

Maximilian and Mexico

In the image below, which is not from the mural, Mexican Conservatives are inviting Maximilian to become the Emperor of Mexico. The role of Mexican Conservatives in keeping monarchism alive and in inviting Maximilian to Mexico sometimes gets overlooked and the Second French Intervention in Mexico is sometimes incorrectly attributed solely to France, and not linked to Mexican conservatives who also played a major role in initiating, prolonging the war and serving as military leaders.

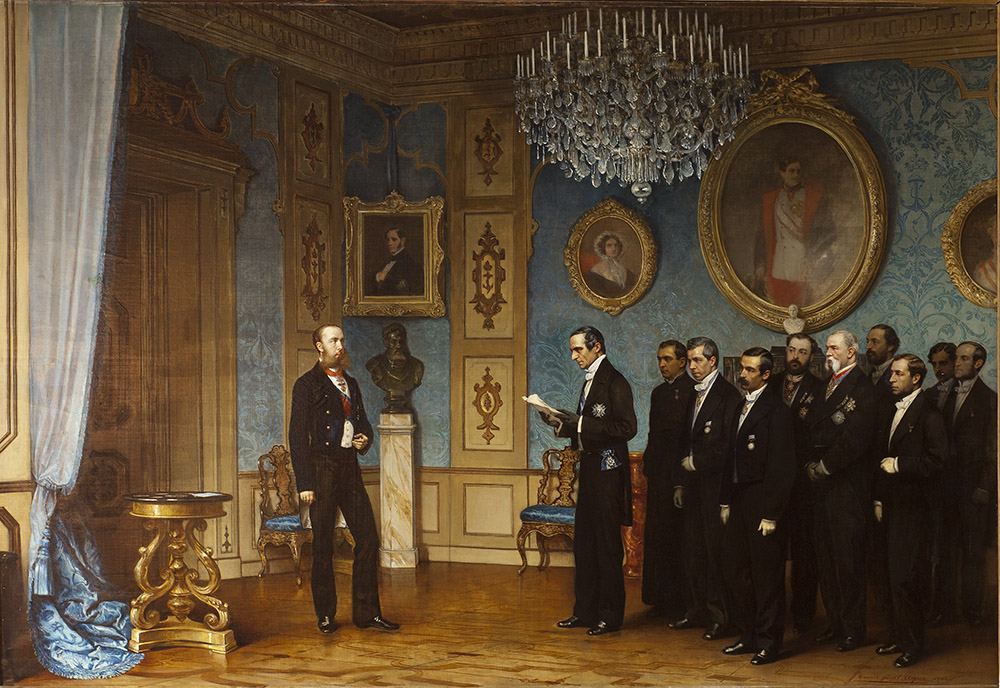
Maximilian receiving a Mexican delegation at Miramar Castle in Trieste, by Cesare Dell'Acqua

==== Mexico's Emperors ====
Mexico has had two emperors, to date. Both died by firing squad. The First Emperor of Mexico was Agustín de Iturbide who reigned from less than a year starting in 1822. He was executed on 19 July 1824. Maximilian I of Mexico reigned as the Emperor of the Second Mexican Empire for a little over three years until his execution on 19 June 1867.

===== How Mexico got her First Emperor =====
Returning our attention to the War of Independence (1810-1821), after Mexico became independent from Spain, Agustín de Iturbide became Emperor of Mexico, formally from 9 May 1822, to 19 March 1823.

In a strange twist of fate, it was Mexican conservatives, led by Iturbide, who brought about independence in 1821, not the liberal insurgents who had started the War of Independence in 1810. The explanation is that when liberals took power in Spain, promises were made in the Constitution of Cadiz for liberalizing the administration of the colonies like New Spain (Mexico). These changes would appease Mexican insurgents. The royalists on the other hand, their opponents in the War of Independence, would lose some of their power. Rather than have Spanish liberal ideas imposed on Mexico, from Spain, the Mexican conservative forces agreed with the Mwxican liberals forces to draw up the Plan of Iguala of 1821 and in this way to end the war. It contained three guarantees for establishing peace: the primacy of Roman Catholicism, the independence of Mexico, and social equality for all Mexicans.

===== The First President of Mexico =====
The Plan of Iguala established Mexico as a constitutional monarchy and as mentioned above, Iturbide became the first emperor. But he ruled for less than a year before Guadalupe Victoria, an insurgent in the War of Independence was installed as the first president of the United States of Mexico after the adoption of the Constitution of 1824.

=== Benito Pablo Juárez García (1806–1872) ===
Considering the entire mural, President, Benito Juárez, is the most prominent personality, at the top and middle of the middle panel. This is understandable, in a mural depicting the history of Oaxaca, since Oaxaca had been renamed Oaxaca de Juárez after his death in 1872. The quotation beside his floating head translates as Respect for the rights of others is peace. The full version is "Entre los individuos, como entre las naciones, el respeto al derecho ajeno es la paz." (In English: Between individuals as between nations, respect for the rights of others is peace.) Juárez wrote these words in a manifesto dated July 15, 1867, after he had approved the execution that ended the Second Mexican Empire.

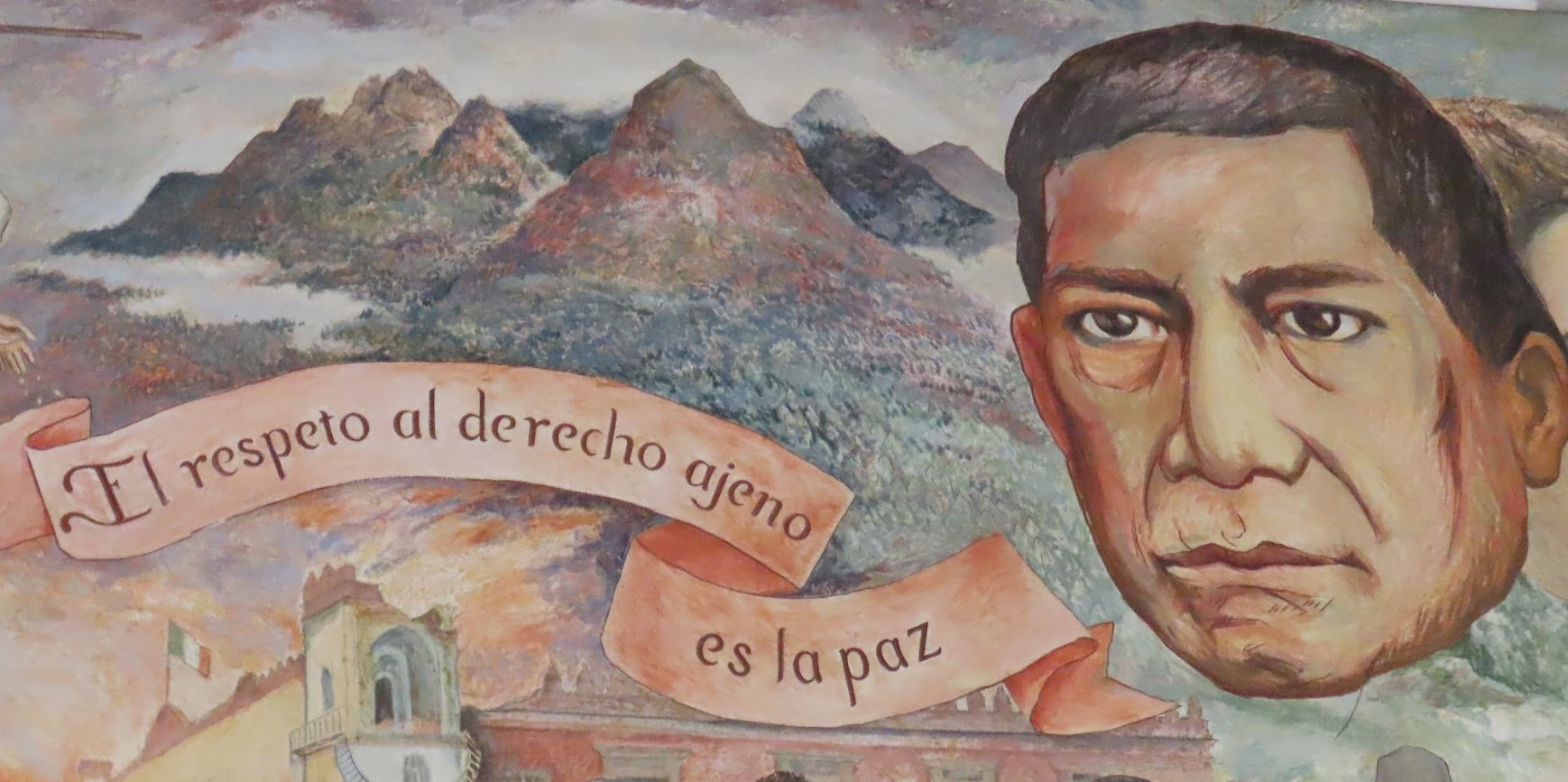
Benito Pablo Juárez García

=== Margarita Maza Juárez ===
García Bustos makes a statement by blending a determined, almost dour Benito Juárez with his equally determined looking partner of over 27 years, Margarita Maza. The couple married in 1843, when Juárez was a 37-year-old civil judge and the well-educated Maza was 17 years old.

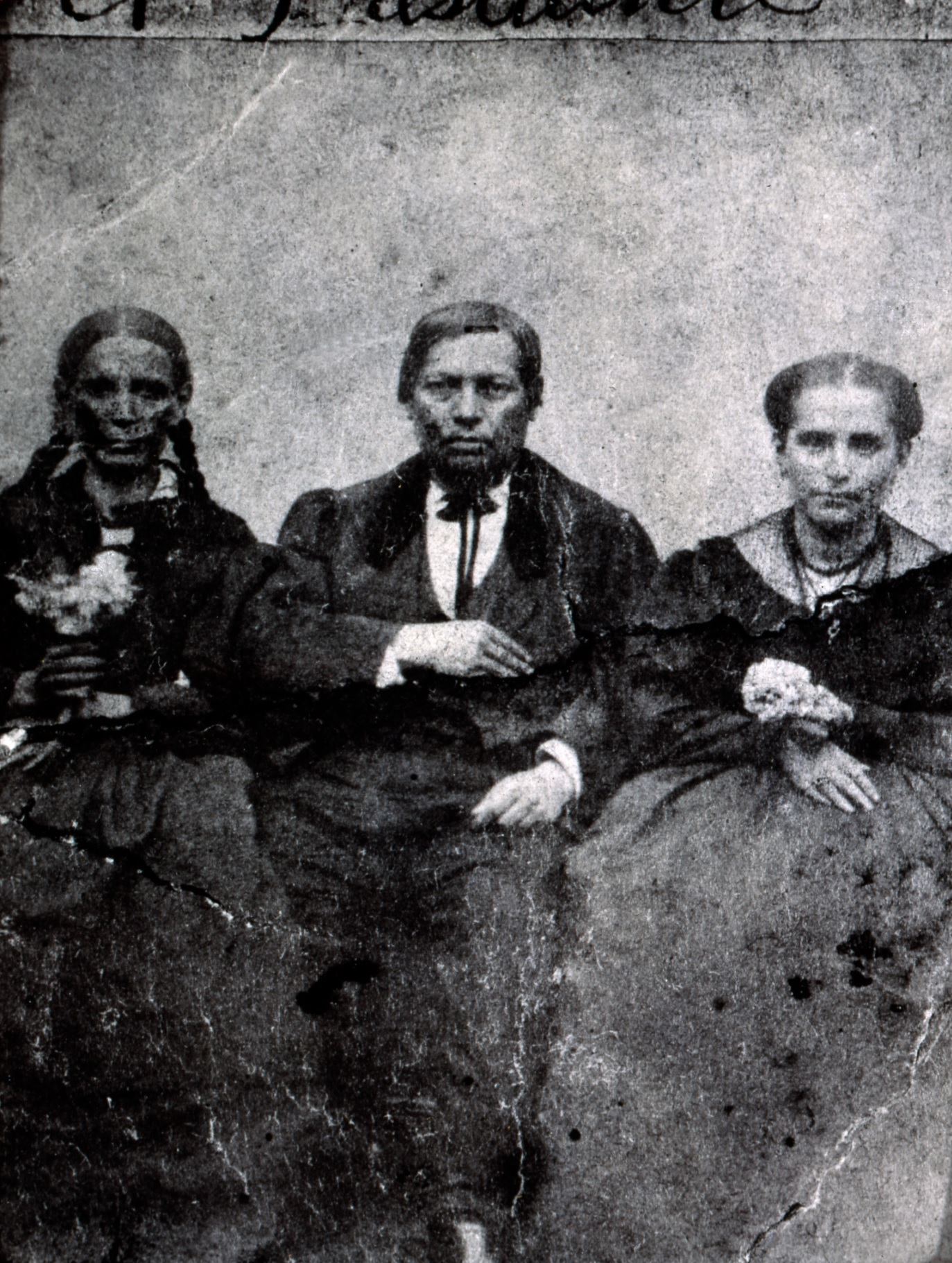
Photograph taken in July 1843, the day of the marriage between Benito Juárez (at the center) and Margarita Maza (at the right), in Oaxaca, Mexico. They are accompanied by Juaréz's sister María Josefa.

Margarita's father was Italian which placed her in a much higher class than Juárez whose both parents were indigenous. And the marriage helped inch Juárez up the social ladder in race-conscious Oaxaca.

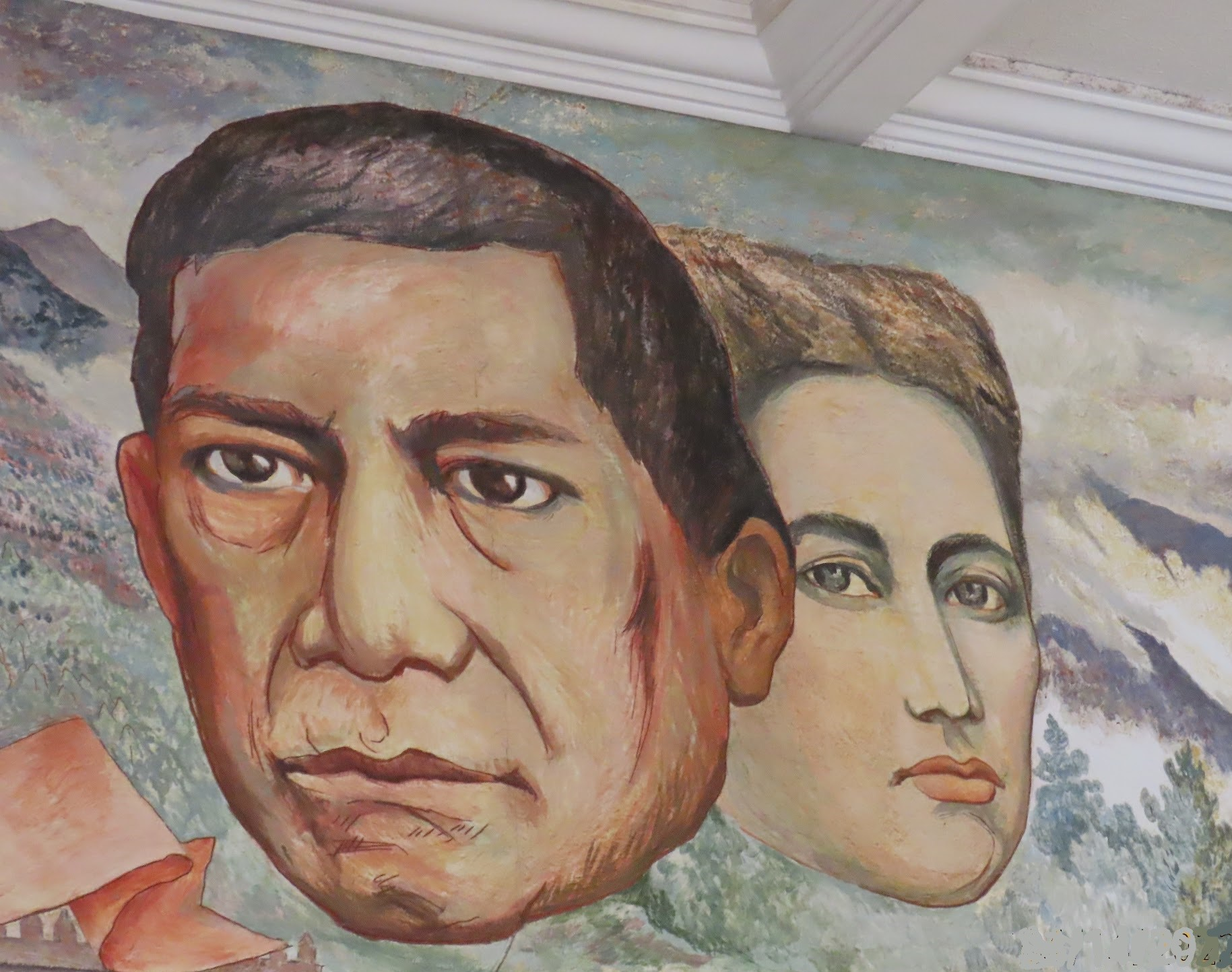
Benito Juárez and Margarita Maza

When Juarez was president they lived in turbulent times, For her safety, Margarita lived in New York City, and then in Washington, DC, and two of their young sons died there, in 1864 and 1865. In Washington, President Lincoln received her as the First Lady of Mexico. After Maximilian I was deposed in 1867 by Juárez forces, Margarita Maza returned to Mexico and she lived for four more years, and died of cancer.

==== Juárez and 11 men ====
Benito Juárez shares a prominent place on this panel along with 11 men mostly from Oaxaca who contributed to his success. They are noted for their association with the Institute of Sciences and Arts of Oaxaca, their government service, their military leadership and their service in the Juárez cabinets.

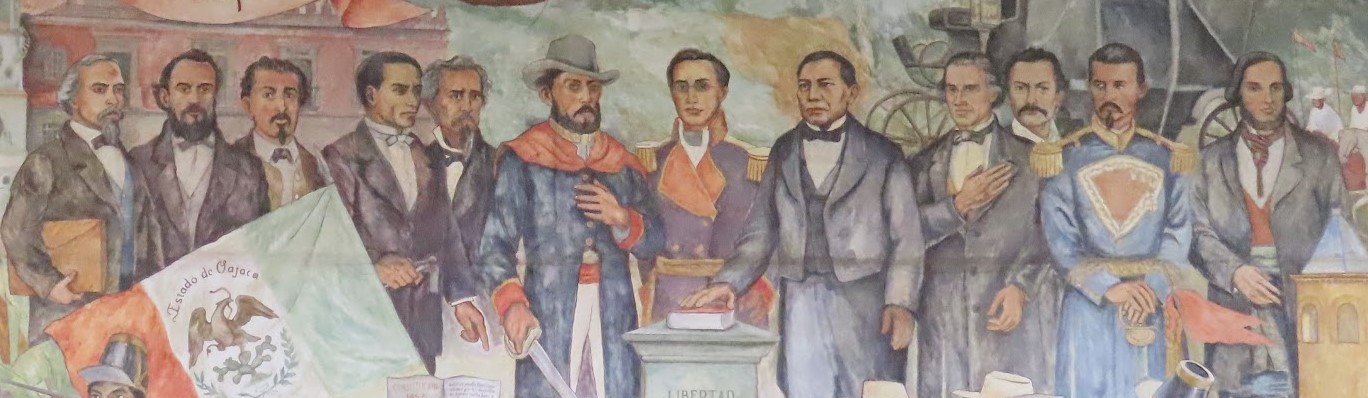
Benito Juárez with 11 men who helped him succeed

Of the seven men on the right hand of Benito Juárez, the first one is General Ignacio Zaragoza Seguin. He famously led the Mexican army of 600 men, (or was it 2,000) at the Battle of Puebla on May 5, 1862. This is the origin of the Cinco de Mayo celebrations. Next, the soldier with the hat and sword is General Mariano Escobedo. Maximilian handed him the sword he holds before the invader's execution.

Ignacio Ramírez is third to the right of Juárez. He is famous for his atheism and his contributions to anti-clericalism in Mexico that limited the Catholic Church. Next is Matias Romero, a writer of deep thought. Like others in the picture he helped to draft the Constitution of 1857. Ignacio Mariscal stands fifth. For more than 27 years he held the position of Secretary of Foreign Relations. Beside him, Marcos Pérez, a teacher at the Oaxaca State Institute of Arts and Sciences. The seventh man is José María Castillo Velasco. He also help to draft the Constitution of '57 and served as a colonel during the French Intervention. Most of these men are Caudillos (military and political leaders), a phenomenon discussed below.

Of the four men pictured on the left of Juárez, the first man is Melchor Ocampo, with his hand on his heart. In France he learned about the liberal and anticlerical ideas of the Enlightenment and the French Revolution. His radical anti-clerical ideas were incorporated in the Reform Laws and the Mexican Constitution of 1857. Next is Ignacio Mejía. He was a Mexican politician and also he fought in the Mexican-American War (1846–48), in the War of Reform (1858–60), in the Second French Intervention in Mexico (1861-1867). Next, a young Porfirio Díaz Mori looks defiant in his military uniform. At 37, Diaz had fought in 37 battles and won most of them. In Oaxaca City, his forces defeated the French on October 3, 1864. But outnumbered 10 to 1, they lost the rematch to a French force on February 2, 1865. After Díaz and his troops surrendered, he was imprisoned in Puebla. Later, he famously escaped and returned to take final control of Oaxaca City on March 16, 1867. He also commanded the Army of the East in its victory at Puebla on April 2, 1867, leading to Maximilian's capture and execution less than three months later.

Although Díaz supported Juárez in the Reform War and during the French invasion, he later broke with Juárez and became the dictator-president of Mexico for 34 years. Both Juárez and Díaz were from Oaxaca and attended El Instituto de Ciencias y Artes de Oaxaca where they learned liberal ideas. Díaz later supplement his liberal ideas with strong-arm techniques. The term Caudillo is used in Latin America to describe leaders like Porfirio Díaz.

The last man to the left of Juárez is José Marie Díaz Ordaz. He was a governor of Oaxaca and fought against the Conservatives.

==== One image that sums up the challenges and achievements of Benito Juárez ====
The image below is located in the center of the entire mural. It represents essential challenges and achievements of Juárez and other Mexican and Oaxacan Liberals before and after Juárez, who saw himself as the embodiment of the lay state.

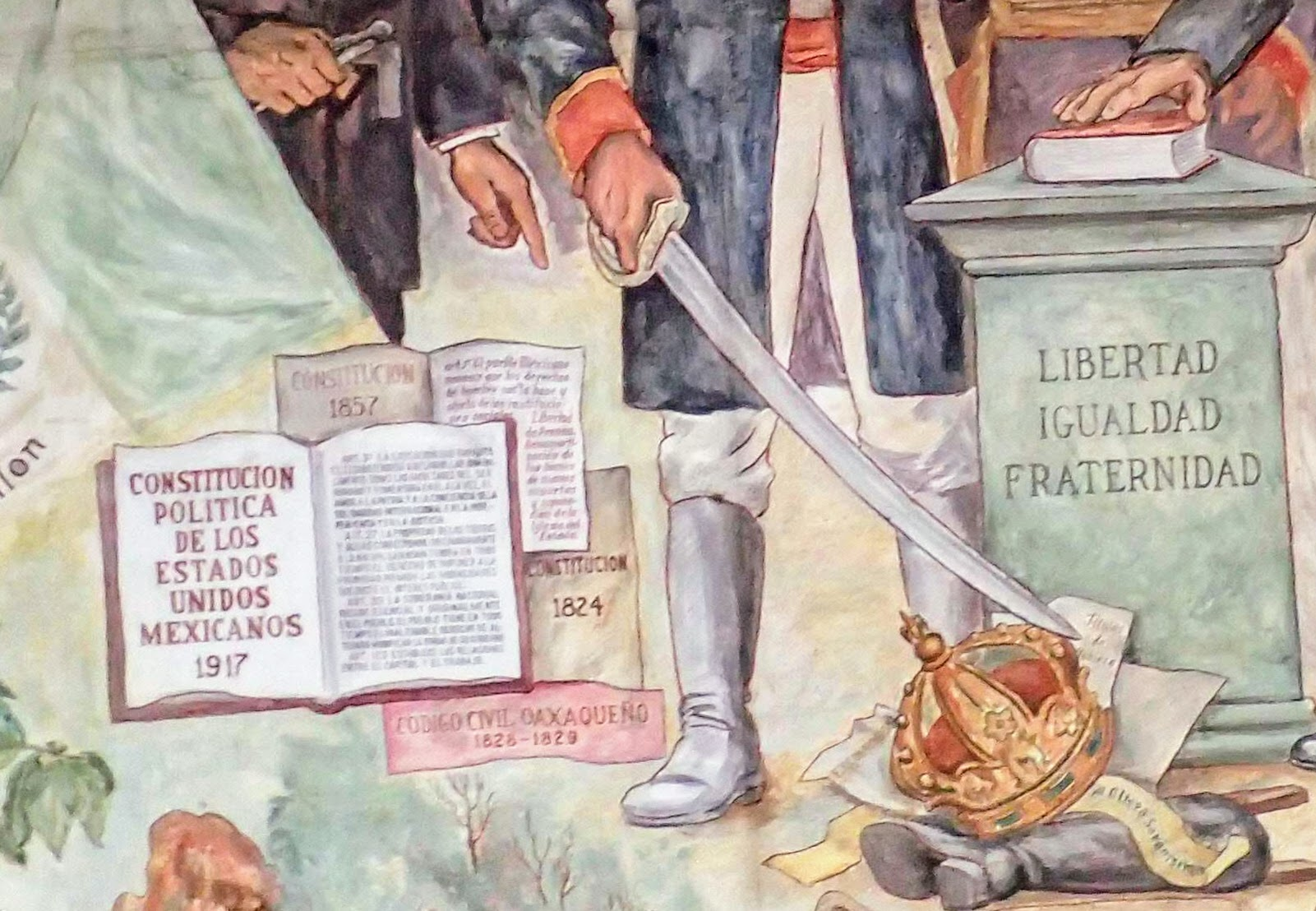
Accomplishments of Juárez

Three of the four documents on the left side of the image above represent the legislative achievements of Liberalism. The Constitution of 1824 is the first republican constitution of the United States of Mexico. El Codigo Civil Oaxacaqueño (1826-1829) was the first civil code in Mexico. The third document, the Constitution of 1857

reduced the power of the Catholic Church and led to the Reform War. The fourth document, the Constitution of 1917, the current constitution of Mexico, written during the Mexican Revolution, sits on top of the other documents suggesting that they build on each other. Bit the Constitution of 1917 supersedes the others. For the first time the constitution included commitments such as free, mandatory, and secular education.

At the top of the image, the hand of Juárez on a book suggests completion of his work and swearing an oath. The light green pillar reflects the Cantera stone used to build Antequera, earning it the name of Antequera Verde. Liberdad, Igualidad, Fraternidad the Spanish for the rallying cry of the French Revolution places Juárez with the famous progressive thinkers of an earlier era. The sword is the one that Maximilian handed to General Escobedo before his execution. The crown of the Hapsburgs represents Maximilian who was the Second Emperor of Mexico from 1864 until he was executed in 1867.

The artificial leg at the bottom of the image above belonged to Antonio de Padua María Severino López de Santa Anna y Pérez de Lebrón (commonly known as Santa Anna) who was a constant thorn in Juárez side. He exiled Juárez to New Orleans, USA in 1853. When Santa Anna lost his leg in battle he used the story to enhance public sympathy, even digging up the amputated part of his leg and holding an elaborate state funeral.

The Mythification of Benito Juárez

Between his death in 1872 and the celebration of his 100th birthday, on March 21, 1906, Benito Juárez became a national mythical hero. One author suggested that Benito Juárez was more virtuous than George Washington because Washington had slaves and Juárez did not. The myth maintained and continues to maintain today that Juárez, a man of impeccable virtue, saved Mexico from foreign aggressors. This myth represents a turnabout in the sense that when Benito Juárez died, he was becoming increasingly unpopular because he had sought reelection in 1867 and 1871, snd that was not permitted by the constitution of 1857.

Mytification started when Juárez died in 1872 with the mandated naming of streets and town squares after him. Also his name was added to Oaxaca City to render it in Spanish Oaxaca de Juárez. In the 1880s the Liberal party of which Juárez had been a member and Díaz was currently a member, was deeply divided into four factions. Díaz tried to use Juárez as a force to unify the Liberals and to legitimize Díaz as the leader.

In 1904 Francisco Bulnes wrote several critical examinations of the contributions of Juárez to Mexico. His published materials sparked a debate which led to the unintended result that many counter-arguments were made about the virtues of Juárez. Thus his status as a national hero hoisted up a notch. The hero status was consolidated with the celebrations of the 100 anniversary of the birth of Juarez in 1906.

Ironically the dictator-president Porfirio Díaz was the main supporters of Juárez as a national hero in the 1900s. Ironic because in 1871, Díaz led a revolt protesting the fact that Juárez sought re-election. Díaz called Juárez a dictator. In 1906 Díaz was famously photographed commemorating Juárez's 100th birthday. (See image below.)

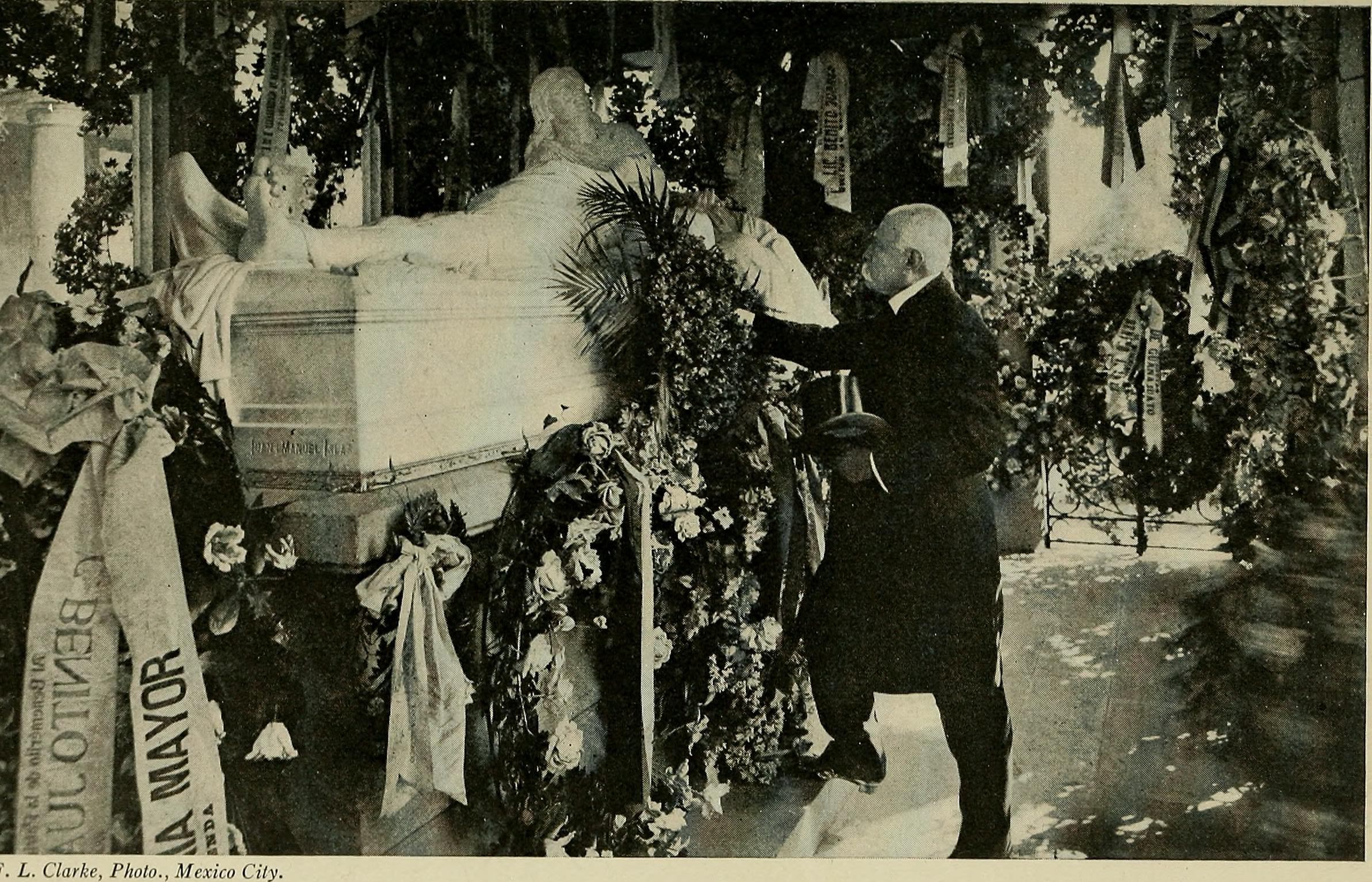
Diaz, commemorating Juárez's 100th birthday

Porfirio Díaz also placed a huge statue of Benito Juárez on the Oaxaca's Cerro del Fortín.

When the time came in 1910, to celebrate the 100th anniversary of the start of the Mexican War of Independence, Porfirio Diaz organized a huge multi-day "fiesta". The cover of the official program featured Hidalgo, Juárez and Diaz. In the image below we see that Juárez is associated with laws (LEX) and Díaz claims peace (PAX).

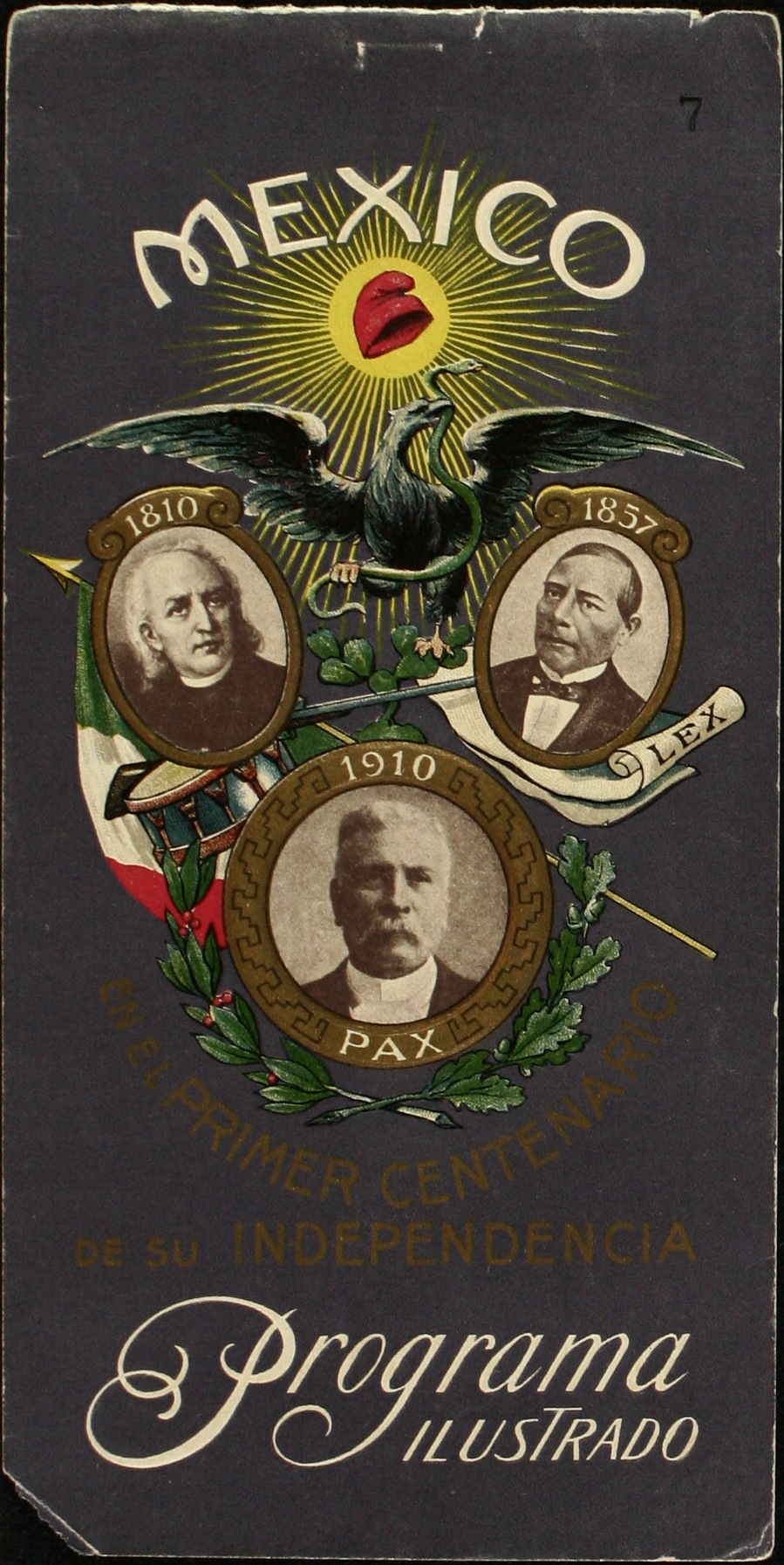
Cover of the program for the official celebrations of the 100th anniversary of the beginning of the War of Indepepndence.

What the Detractors of Benito Juarez say

The common criticism of Benito Juarez is that his administration was ready to grant the United States hegemony over the Isthmus of Tehuantepec by the McLane–Ocampo Treaty. In 1859 fighting the Conservatives in the War of Reform, the Juárez administration was exploring all ways to stay afloat. The Treaty was not ratified in the United States so the criticism is about the unpatriotic effort that Juárez was leading, not for a definitive action. This criticism is prominent in Facebook posts by Mexicans, who while taking a swipe at Juárez for the foregoing, then turn to Porfirio Díaz claiming he was a superior president because he advanced the economy and gained international prestige for Mexico.

In the end both the positive myths and the negative ones reflect the reality of the complete Benito Juárez story.

==== Santa Anna, the Caudillo of Veracruz (1794–1876) ====
Mexico struggled after the war of independence and had 50 governments in 30 years. Santa Anna led this chaos as president 11 times, or 8 as some claim, between the years of 1833 and 1855, serving for various lengths of time. Santa Anna had a power base and an army in Veracruz and used it to wage war and take the reins of power as required, or as he wished. Once again, Santa Anna does not appear in the mural, but García Bustos, always ready to add something mural, included Santa Anna's famous prosthetic leg, as explained above.

==== Government by buggy ====
In the image below, behind Juárez and his supporters, we see a buggy that Juárez drove through the countryside for some four years after he was exiled from Mexico City while the Conservatives usurped power during the Second French Intervention. Accompanying Juárez were government officials and soldiers. The carriage, a Landau, was known as the "government on wheels".

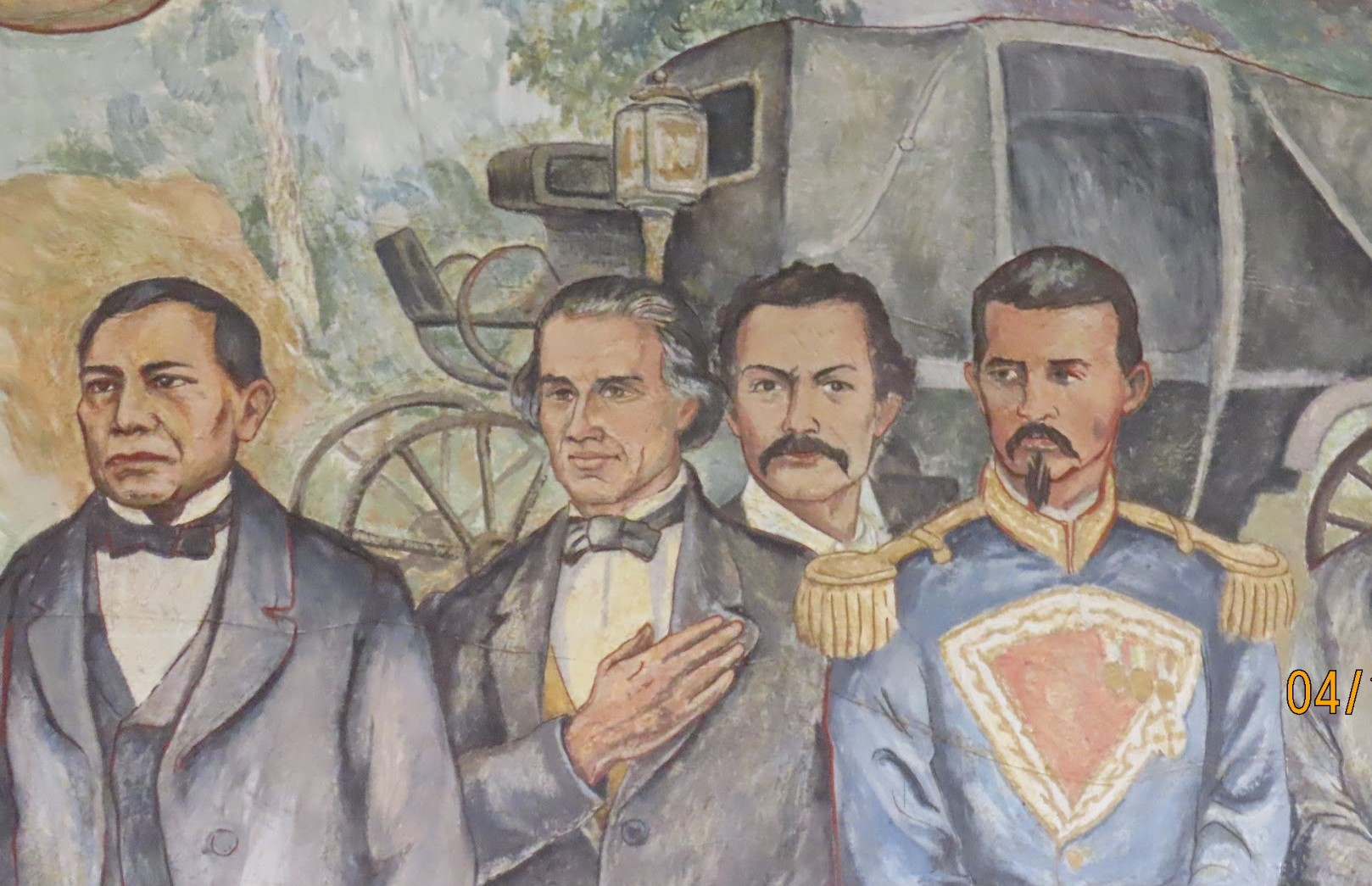
The "government on wheels" in the background

==== Porfirio Díaz and Oaxaca ====
He was born in Oaxaca across the street from the Basílica de Nuestra Señora de la Soledad. He attended The Instituto de Ciencias y Artes de Oaxaca where he met Benito Juárez and other leading liberals. He left his formal studies during the Mexican-American War and later served in increasingly responsible positions in the Mexican Army.

==== Porfirio Díaz, the soldier ====
In the image above, Porfirio Díaz is the soldier on the extreme right. This depiction resembles a photo from 1867 when he was rising to the rank of general.

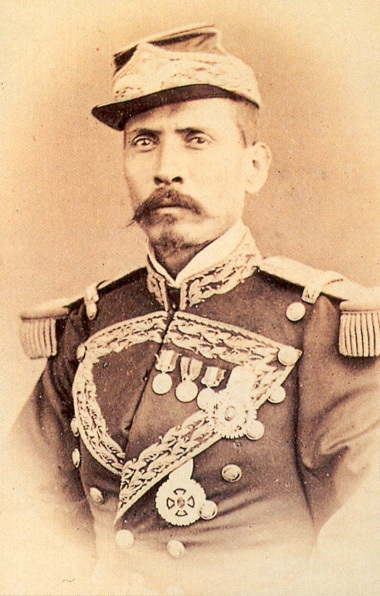
Porfirion Díaz in 1867

Porfirio Díaz played a central role in battles in the Reform War and the Second French Intervention. In the Reform War, in the Battle of Oaxaca of 1858, the Conservatives attacked and held Díaz and his soldiers and other leaders in the convents of Santo Domingo, Carmen Alto and Santa Catarina for 19 days before the Oaxacans broke out on 16 January and defeated the conservatives in places such as the present day Zocalo and Llano Park. Later, major battles took place, with victories for Díaz and his troops on 11 May and again on August 5, 1860.

In the French Intervention the soldiers commanded by Díaz defeated the Imperial army of Maximillian at the Battle of Miahuatlán on 3 October 1866, and the Battle of La Carbonara on 18 October, leading to the liberation of Oaxaca City from Imperial troops on 31 October. Both battles were decisive, and allowed Díaz troops to completely rearm and prepare for the Third Battle of Puebla of 2 April 1867. These victories, under Díaz also prepared the republican forces to attack Querétaro, take Maximillian prisoner, execute him and to enter Mexico City without resistance, and restore the Republic, with Juárez as president on 15 July 1867.

==== Porfirio Díaz, the politician ====
Following his military success, Díaz sought political power. After 1867, with Juárez back as president, Díaz went on the attack because the constitution permitted only one term as president. In 1870 Díaz ran against Juárez and lost. He challenged that the election was rigged and eventually encouraged rebellions against Juárez, which failed. Through a series of rebellions, after Juárez died and his successor Ledo had served, Díaz became president in 1877.

==== Industrial expansion ====
At the top the image below we see references to industrial expansion that occurred in Mexico during the dictatorship of Porfirio Díaz. Electricity towers, oil refinery, shipping. Below is a space devoted to the reaction to the industrialization and the poverty of the masses. And on the left we see images of post-revolutionary leaders.

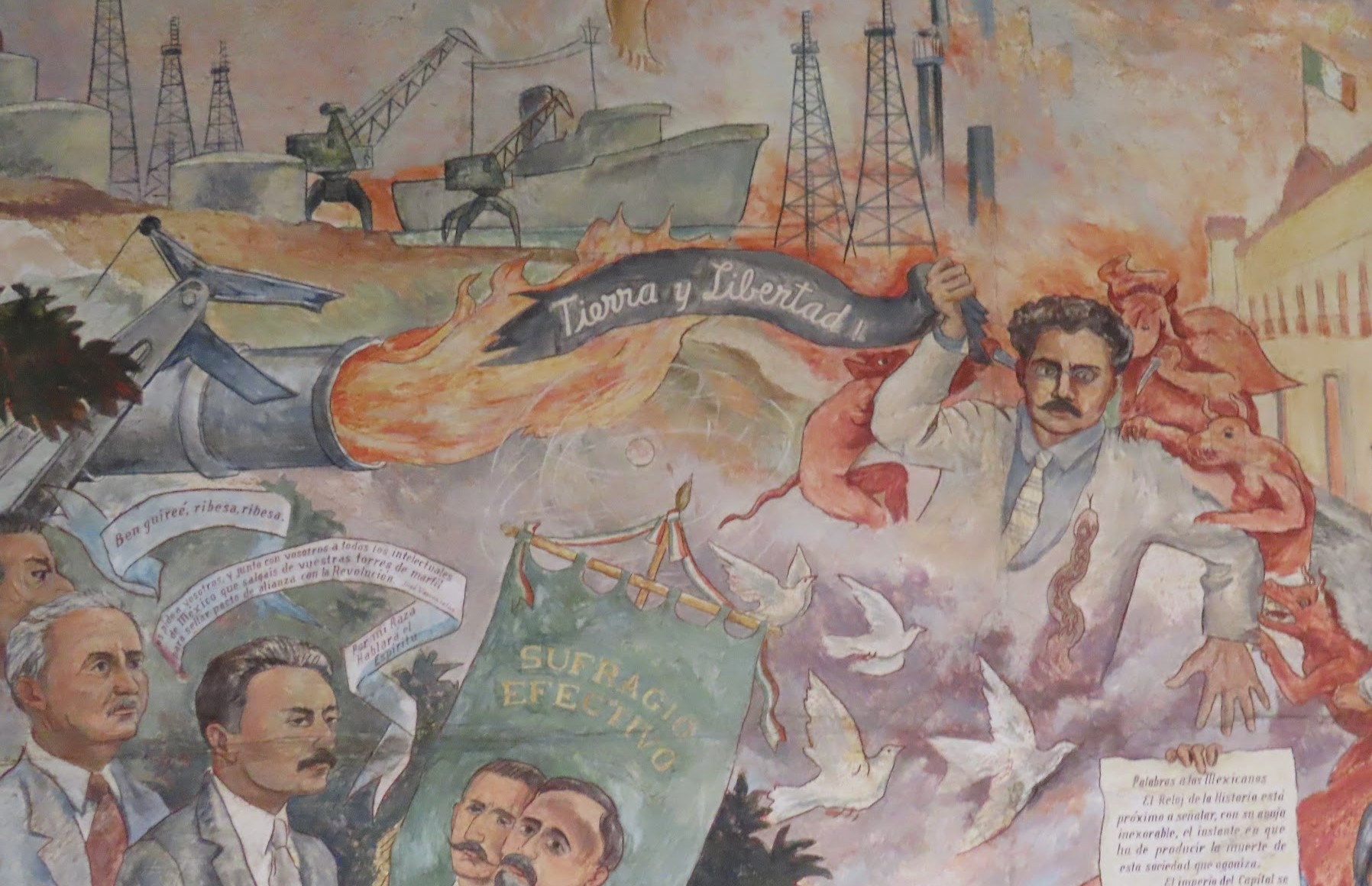
Images related to the Díaz presidency

==== Accomplishments of the Díaz presidency ====
While the Juárez presidency is noted for establishing liberal legislation and defeating the French Invasion, the Díaz regime, is known for economic progress. Some of the achievements are 800 kilometers of railways, 20,000 kilometers of telegraph lines, and 1,200 post offices. In addition, Díaz brought the telephone and electricity to Oaxaca and elsewhere in Mexico.

=== The Mexican Revolution, (1910-21) ===
In the image below, from the left side of the middle panel of the mural at the top, we see evidence of industrialization, on the right is the reaction of leaders like Ricardo Flores Magón. The middle is occupied by the politician Francisco I. Madero and José Maria Pino Suárez. Further left are leading thinkers from Oaxaca, of the post revolutionary period, José Vasconcelos, Andrés Henestrosa and Nazario Chacón.

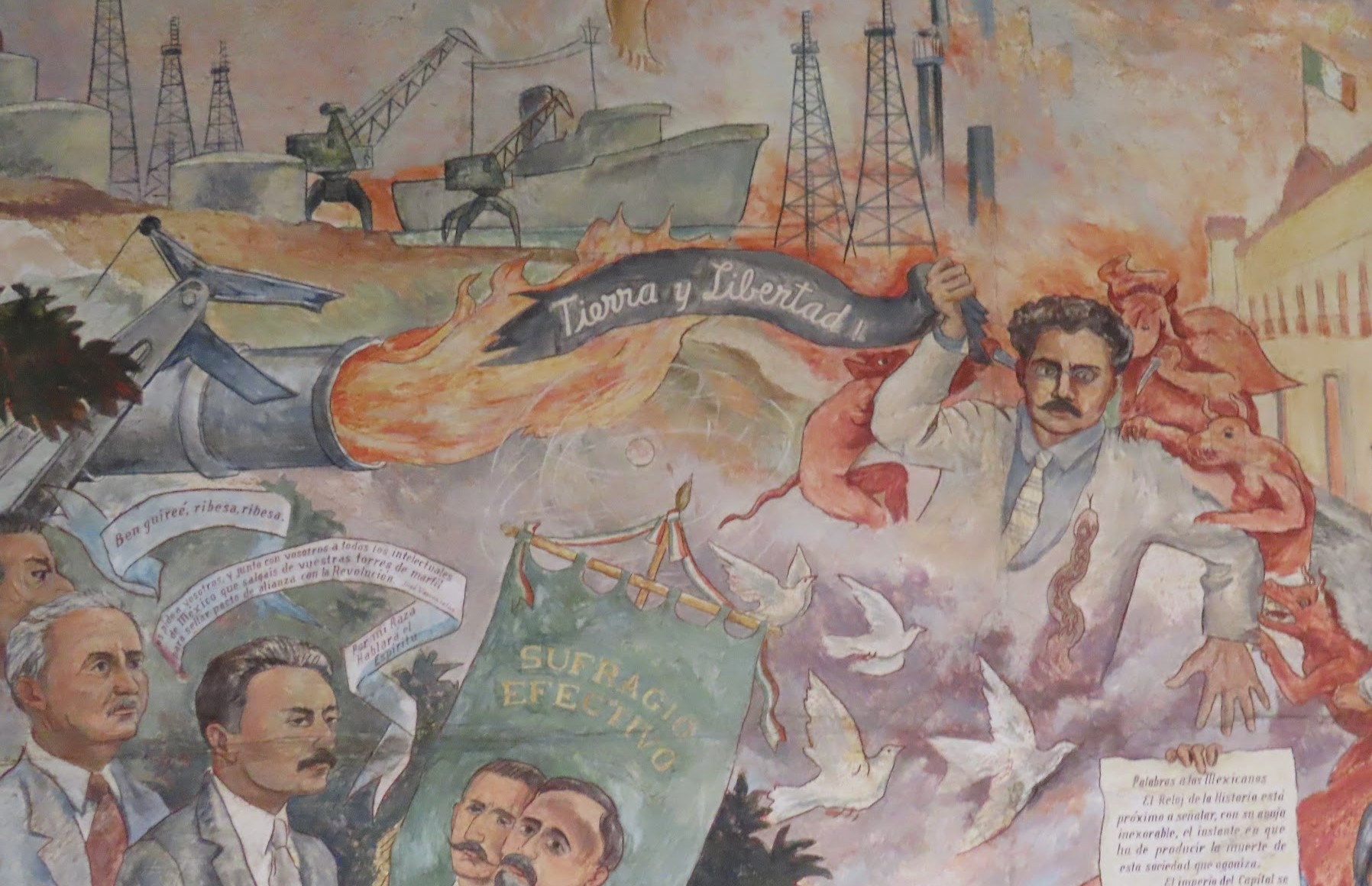
Images related to the Mexican Revolution and after

==== Ricardo Flores Magón (1874–1922) ====
Two images of Ricardo Flores Magón appear on the mural. He appears in the image above on the right side. The Zapata rallying cry Tierra y Liberdade appears on his left, underlining Flores Magón's association with the rural movement led by Emiliano Zapata. Flores Magón also appears as a large floating head on the panel, as discussed below.

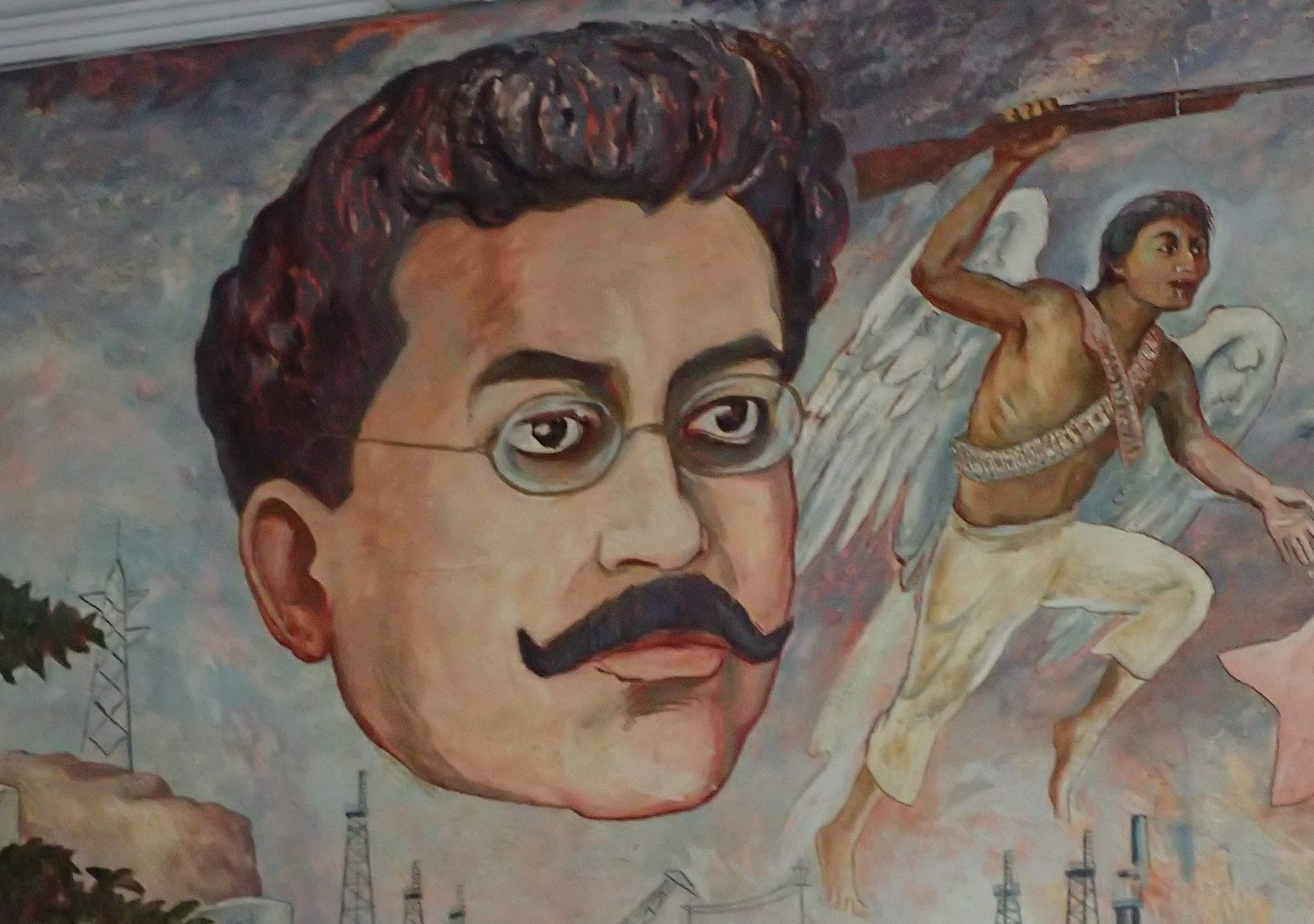
Ricardo Flores Magón prominently displayed on the mural

Ricardo Flores Magón was born in the independent indigenous community, San Antonio Eloxochitlán, Oaxaca, now known as Eloxochitlán de Flores Magón. It is 233 kilometers from Oaxaca City almost halfway between Oaxaca City and Mexico City. Richard Flores Magón, was a thought leader of the Mexican Revolution, an anarchist and the creator of Regeneración along with his brothers Enrique and Jesús. And to his right, devils appear to taunt Flores Magón and below him, peace doves he holds the text that we see more clearly.

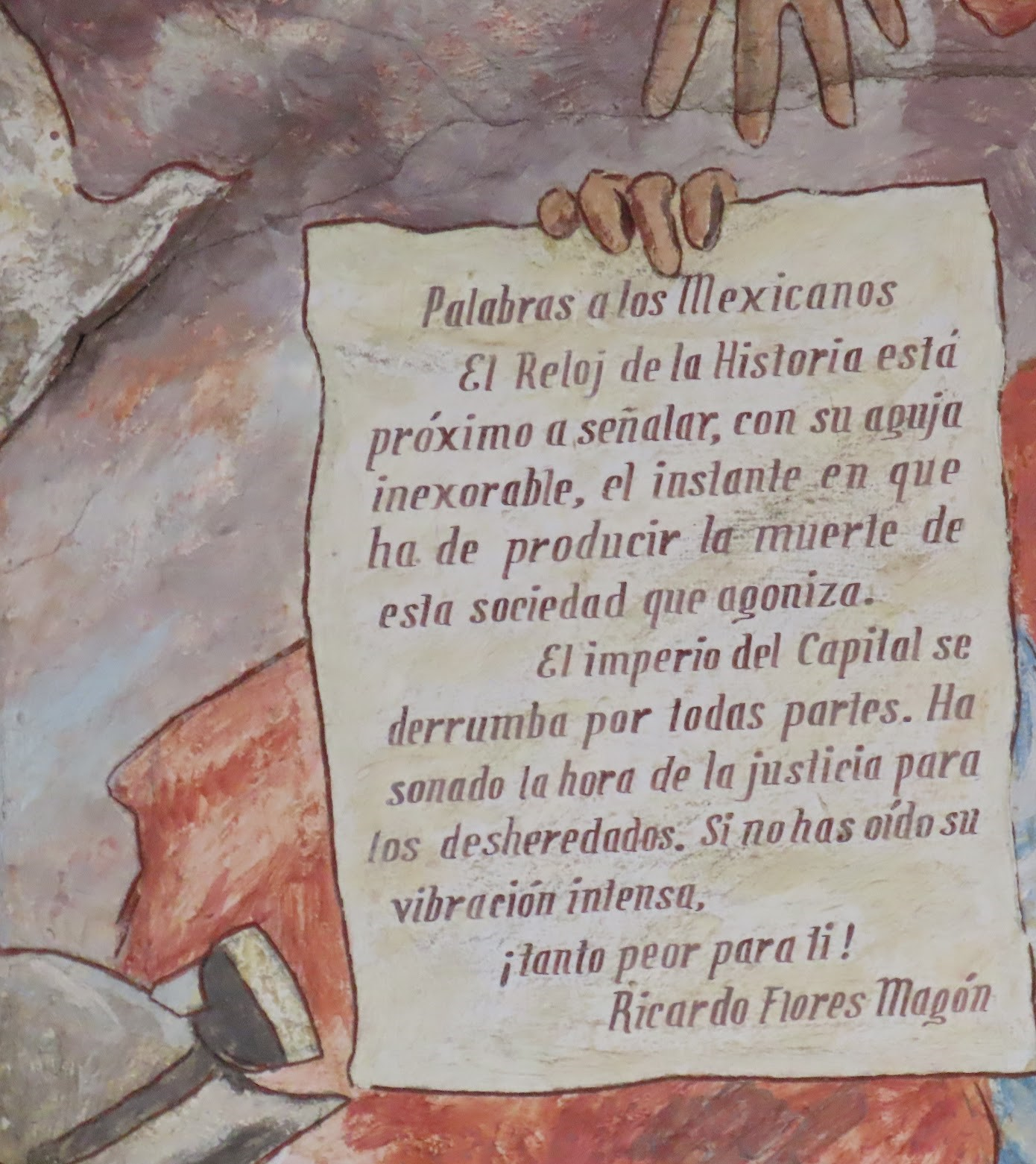
Words to Mexicans

The text says in Spanish:

Palabras a los Mexicanos

"El Reloj de la Historia está proximo a senalar, con su aguja inexorable, el instante en que de produicir la muerte de una sociedad agonize. El imperio del capital se derrumba por todos partes. Ha sonado la hora de la justicia para los desheredados. Si no has oído su vibración intensa, ¡Tanto peor para ti!"

Or in English:

Words to Mexicans

"The Clock of History is about to mark, with its inexorable needle, the moment in which it will bring about the death of a dying society. The empire of capital is collapsing everywhere. The hour of justice has struck. for the disinherited. If you have not heard its intense vibration, so much the worse for you!"

===== The Importance of Ricardo Flores Magón for Arturo García Bustos and others =====
Arturo García Bustos recognized that Ricardo Flores Magón was a major player in the history of Oaxaca and Mexico and he placed him at the higher level of importance on the mural, equivalent to as Benito Juárez, Margaret Maza and José Maria Morelos.

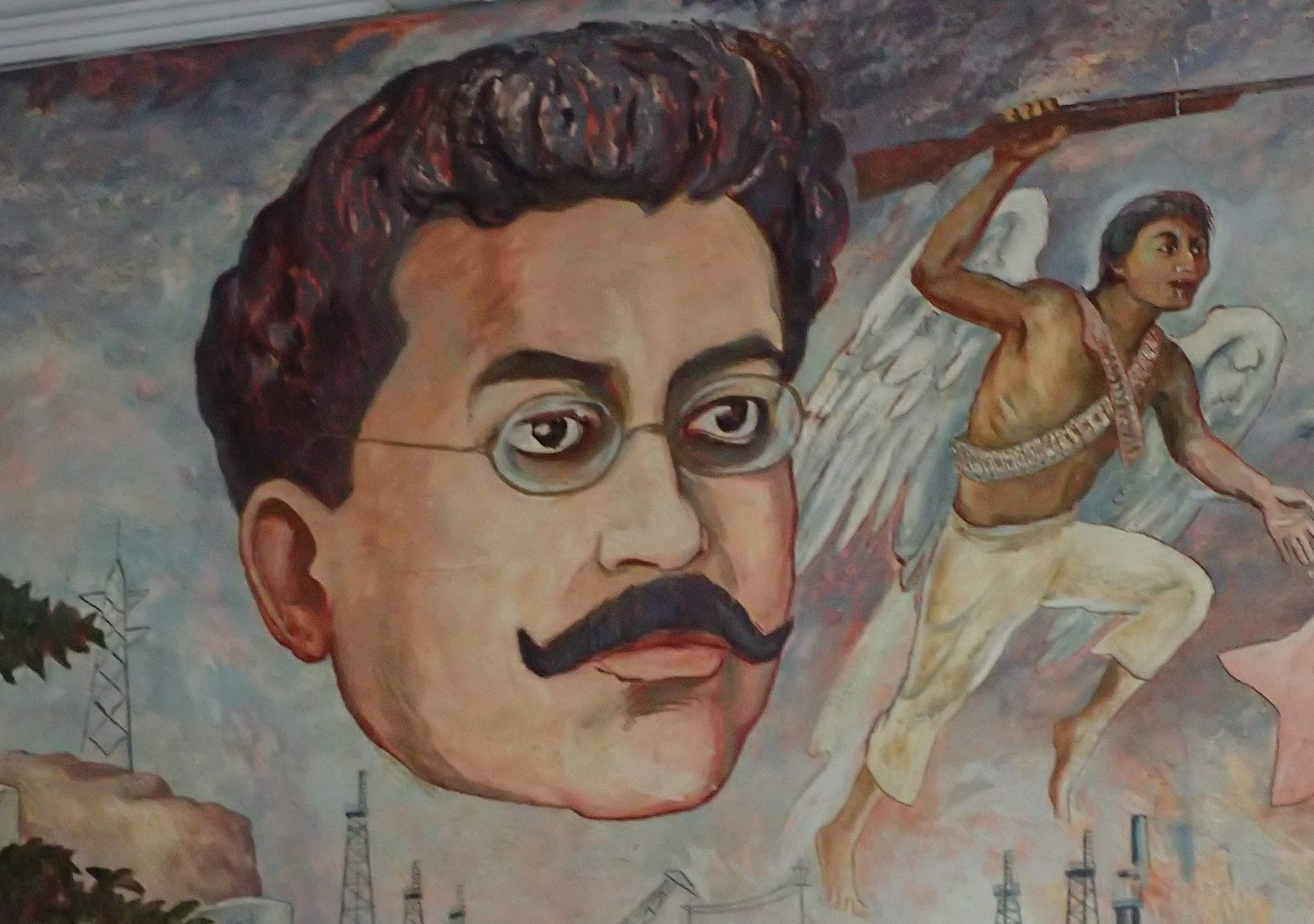
Ricardo Flores Magón

García Bustos was an active member of communist and socialist groups, especially those associated with artists such as the Taller de Gráfica Popular. His travels led him to Eastern Germany, Cuba and Guatemala where he learned about international socialist movements including the Russian sponsored World Peace Council. So understandably a Mexican communist thought leader, born in Oaxaca, was an important subject for García Bustos. Flores also appears prominently in the famous murals of Diego Rivera, David Alfaro Siqueiros and others. Over the years, various images of Flores Magón have been used to reflect the state version of moderate socialism, not the anarchist views of Flores Magón expressed in Palabras a los Mexicanos.

The goal of Regeneracíon was to promote all forms of justice: social, economic, political and legal, which in the opinion of the Magonistas had been undermined in the Porfiriato. The newspaper reached a broad international audience, including Canada, Europe, and the United States, where it was eventually published. Topics included anti-religious, anti-capitalist, and anti-authority. After Díaz was elected in a rigged election for the fifth time in 1901, Regeneracíon targeted his illegal and anti-democratic activities. The Mexican courts banned his writings in 1904, and Ricardo Magón fled to the United States, where he spent the rest of his life. With the outbreak of WWI, he voiced his opposition and was accused of organizing anti-war protests and engaging in espionage, such as transmitting information to the German government. US courts convicted Ricardo Magón in August 1918 under the US Espionage Act, marking the end of Regeneración. With his conviction and sentence of 15 years, Flores Magón was jailed in various US prisons. He spent his last years in Kentucky's notorious Leavenworth Penitentiary. There, he taught Spanish and made many friends with other prisoners.

He had diabetes and was losing his eyesight. During hospitalization, he was neglected and died. The request by the Mexico Congress in November 1922 for his remains to be returned was denied. In 1945, his remains were interred in Rotunda of Illustrious Persons, in Mexico City.

The circulation of Regeneración never exceeded 20,000 copies. Nevertheless, the publication earned a place in Mexican history and mythology. In 2022, I picked up a copy of a publication entitled Regeneracíon in a leftist cafe in Oaxaca. Today, Regeneración has an online presence for all sorts of causes in Mexico.

==== Francisco Ignacio Madero González (1873-1913) and José María Pino Suárez (1869-1913) ====
Madero and Suárez are located on the left side of the Independence, Reform, Revolution Panel. They were not born in Oaxaca and they have little direct association with the history of Oaxaca. However, Madero is an important figure in Mexican history because he challenged Porfirio Díaz in the 1910 election. Díaz declared himself victorious for an eighth term in what amounted to another rigged election. In 1911 Madero was elected in a landslide and sworn into office on 6 November 1911. Generals Félix Díaz (a Oaxacan nephew of Porfirio Díaz of Oaxaca), led a coup supported by United States ambassador Henry Lane Wilson. The captured Madero and assassinated him along with vice-president Pino Suárez in a series of events now called the Ten Tragic Days, The ensuing chaos impacted Oaxaca as we will see below.

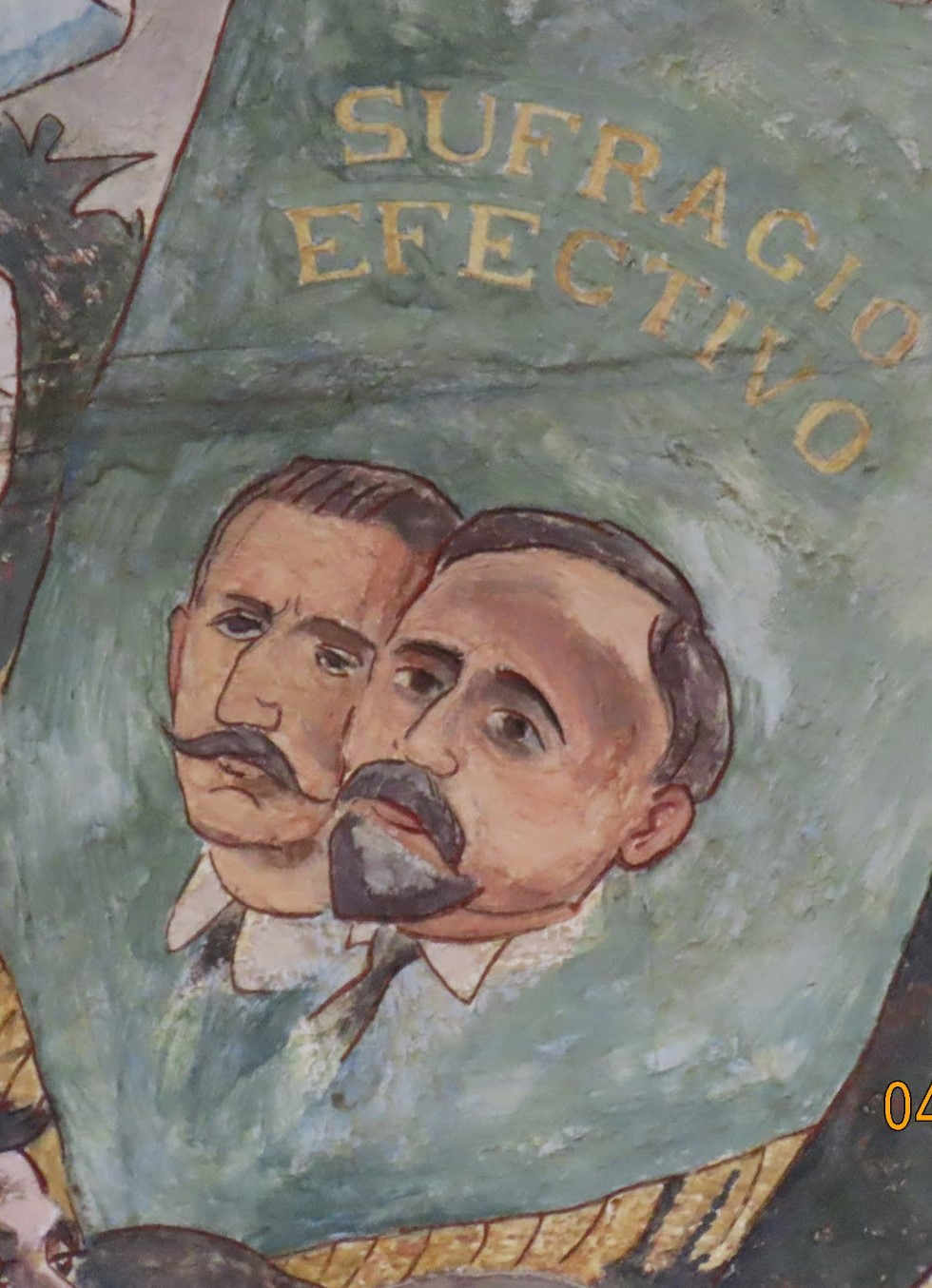
Madero and Pino Suárez

==== The Mexican Revolution in Oaxaca ====
Francisco Ignacio Madero visited Oaxaca in December 1909 to rally support for his bid at the presidency. In 1911, as President of Mexico, Madero gained support in Oaxaca from Governor Benito Juárez Maza, the son of Benito Juárez Garcia.

In Oaxaca, during the Mexican Revolution, especially initially, the battles and the chaos was in the political system. Between December 1910 and June 1915, the government of Oaxaca changed 33 times, with 16 different governors. There were many factions, including Maderistas, one of 14 factions. supporting Francisco Ignacio Madero González. Recent studies suggest that the Maderista movements in Oaxaca was not rural but middle class, seeking social mobility, and greater local autonomy. Evidence of at least one rural uprising in Oaxaca was in line with rebellions in other parts of Mexico. Maderistas from Guerrero, led Mixtec peasants of Pinotepa Nacional, Oaxaca, to revolt on 18 May 1911. They demanded the return of their ancient communal lands. The leaders of the unsuccessful revolt were executed. In 1915 after President Carranza suspended the constitution, the State of Oaxaca declared itself a free and sovereign state.

==== Oaxacan Leaders, post-revolutionary period ====
On the left side of the panel, beside the images of Madero and Suárez, the artist placed three Mexican leaders from Oaxacan, Nazario Chacon Pineda Andrés Henestrosa Morales, and José Vasconcelos Calderón. In the image below, Nazario Chacon is the less visible. Andres Henestrosa is in the middle and José Vasconcelos Calderón is in front. Each left his mark on Mexico in a different way.

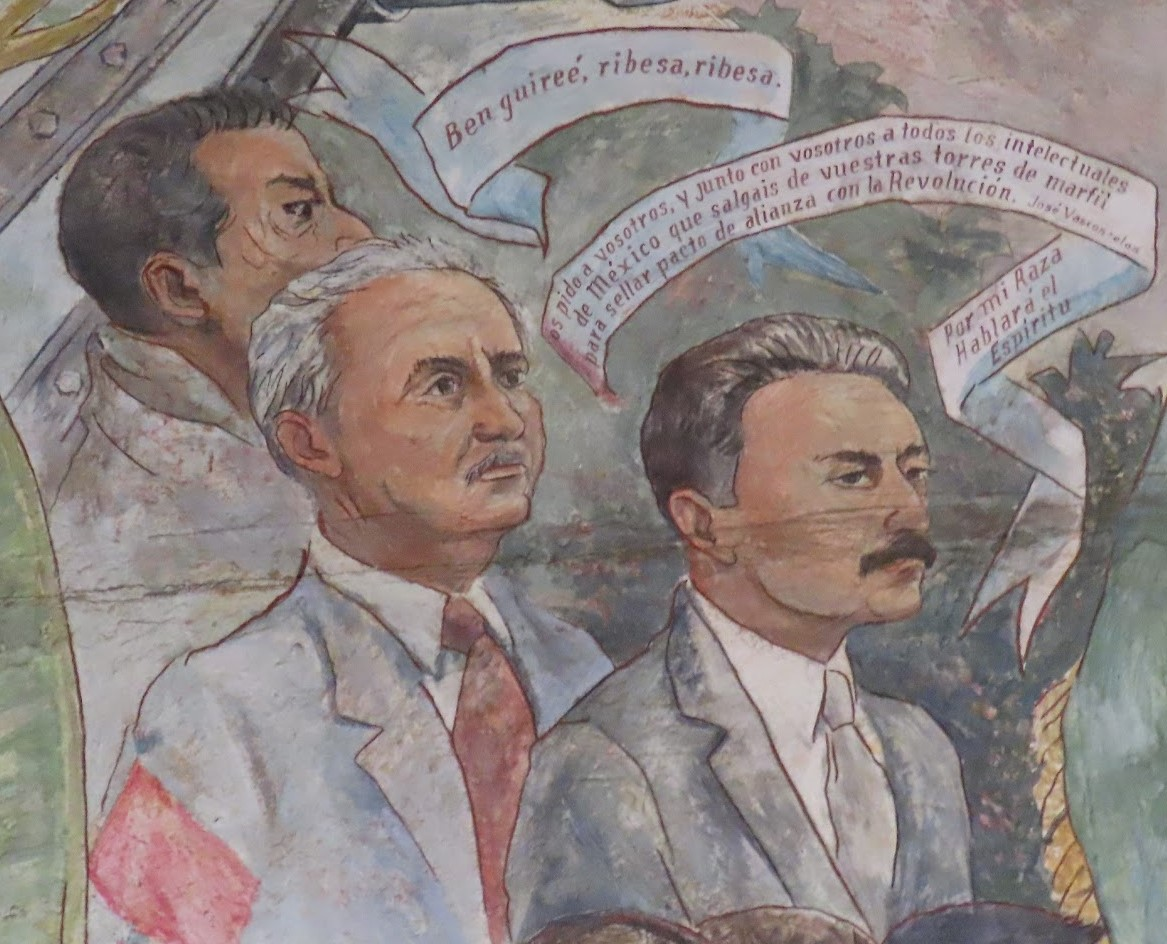
Nazario Chacon Pineda Andrés Henestrosa Morales, and José Vasconcelos Calderón

===== Nazario Chacon Pineda (1916–1994) =====
Nazario Chacon was a poet from Juchitán de Zaragoza, a city in the Istmo de Tehuantepec region of Oaxaca. Chacon Pineda wrote lyrical poetry in his regional version of Zapotec, which is a richly poetic language. Zapotec is the oldest written language in the Americas and there are 57 variations according to some linguists, and although the version spoken by Nazario Chacon is only spoken by some 100,000 people, it is considered a Mexican national treasure. Here is an example of his poetry in Spanish and English which, while it does not reflect the music of the Zapotec language, it does nevertheless illustrate the authors deep connection with nature.

Flor de los olivos

Si al acercar los oídos al caracol primitivo,

el viento propagara repetida, la queja

niña del amor de los orígenes, nacida

en la impalpable espina del martirio,

la ola agitaría el mar del sentimiento,

la minúscula barca del sentido;

presto al pulso y al latido inusitado,

semejante al anhelo y al delirio.

olive flower

If by bringing your ears closer to the primitive conch shell,

the wind will propagate repeated, the complaint

origins love girl, born

on the impalpable thorn of martyrdom,

the wave would shake the sea of feeling,

the tiny boat of meaning;

quick to the pulse and the unusual heartbeat,

akin to longing and delirium.

. . .

===== Andrés Henestrosa Morales (1906–2008) =====
Andrés Henestrosa Morales was born in Ixhuatán, Oaxaca. He was a leader in the realm of Mexican Literature and politician. In addition to his prose and poetry, Henestrosa was elected to the federal legislature, serving three terms in the Chamber of Deputies, as a senator representing the state of Oaxaca from 1982 to 1988.

===== José Vasconcelos Calderón (1882–1959) =====
We referred to José Vasconcelos at the beginning of this Wikipedia article under the background section because he was the government official who is credited with initiating the project to create public art like the murals of Diego Rivera.

In the image above, the text above the heads of the three men was authored by Vasconcelos. The text is a shortened version of the following:

"El cargo que ocupo me pone en el deber de hacerme intérprete de las aspiraciones populares, y en nombre de ese pueblo que me envía os pido a vosotros, y junto con vosotros a todos los intelectuales de México, que salgáis de vuestras torres de marfil para sellar pacto de alianza con la Revolución. Alianza para la obra de redimirnos mediante el trabajo, la virtud y el saber. El país ha menester de vosotros. La Revolución ya no quiere, como en sus días de extravío, cerrar las escuelas y perseguir a los sabios"

The above, translated, by machine, into English is:

"The position I occupy puts me in the duty of becoming an interpreter of popular aspirations, and on behalf of that people that sends me, I ask you, and together with you all the intellectuals of Mexico, to come out of your ivory towers. to seal an alliance pact with the Revolution. Alliance for the work of redeeming ourselves through work, virtue and knowledge. The country needs you. The Revolution no longer wants, as in its days of misguidance, to close the schools and persecute the wise."

José Vasconcelos was born in Oaxaca, Oaxaca. In his youth his family moved to Piedras Negras, Coahuila, a border town where he attended school in Eagle Pass, Texas. As a result, he became fluently bilingual in Spanish and English and moved freely, working and writing in the English-speaking world. He developed a theory that Mexicans could become a fifth "cosmic race", a new superior civilization built on the genes of existing civilizations flowing through the veins of Mexicans. In 1924 he ran for governor of Oaxaca and lost in a disputed election. He was an unsuccessful candidate in the 1929 Mexican presidential election, claimed the results were rigged and developed his call to insurrection in his "Plan de Guaymas". The historian Enrique Krauze, who is cited in several places in this article, claims that Vasconcelos would have won if the election had not been rigged in favour of Pascual Ortiz Rubio.

===== The Cristero War in Oaxaca (1926–29) =====
There do not seem to be any clear references on the mural to the Cristero Wars in Oaxaca. There was little confrontation between the government and the Church in Oaxaca during the Cristero Wars because of a gentleman's agreement between the local government and the Church designed to avoid bloodshed. However, there was some conflict. On 10 October 1928, the Catholic rebels liberators ambushed a party of soldiers, killing 21. On 18 December they kill another 12 soldiers.

Of the five civil wars reviewed here: War of Independence (1810–21), War of Reform (1857-60), the Second French Invasion, (1861–67) the Mexican Revolution, (1910-21), it was the Cristero War (1926–29) that had less impact on Oaxaca.

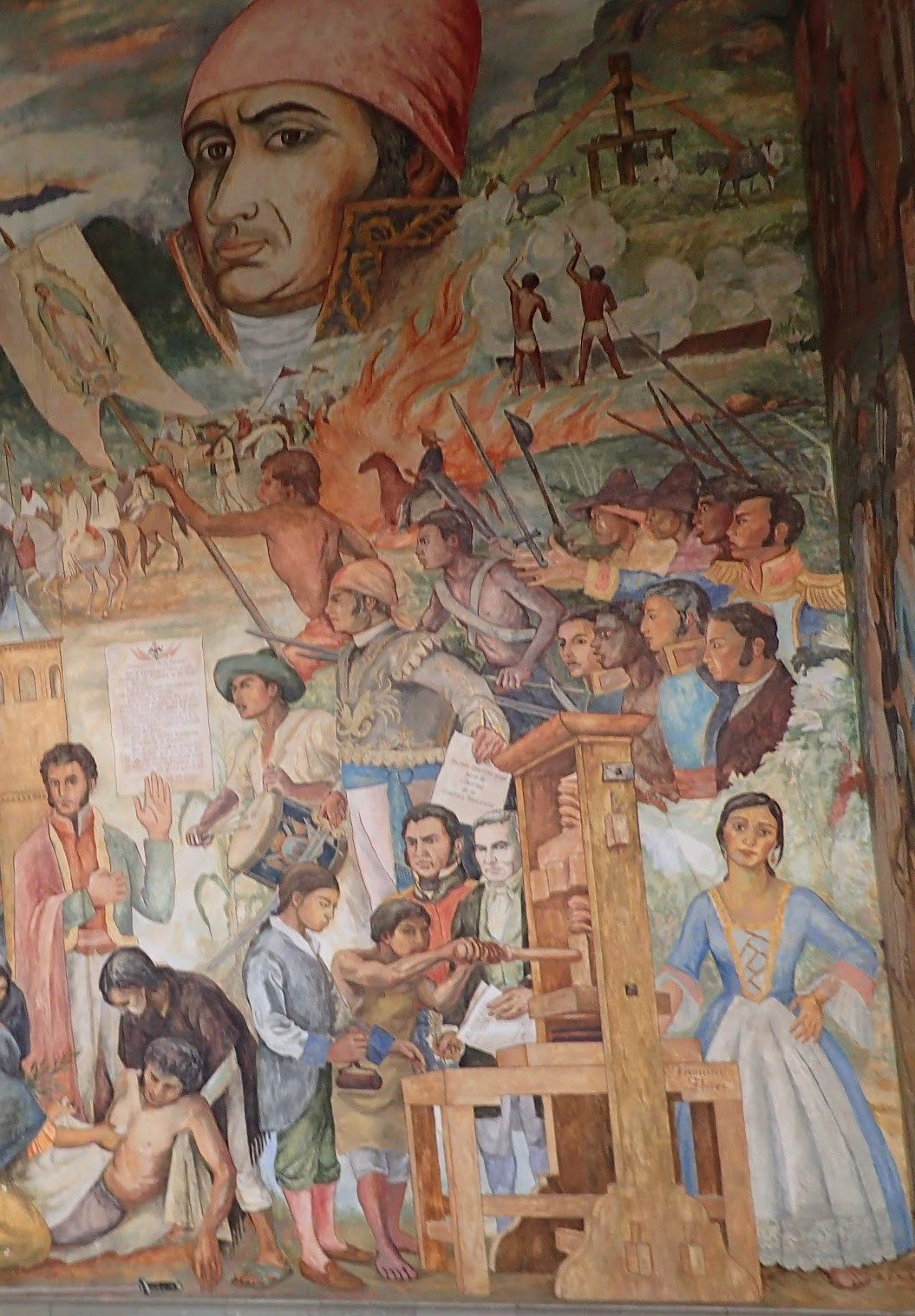
A representation of various civil wars in Oaxaca.

=== A jubilant parade ===
The artist depicts musical instruments on all three panels, as music is an important aspect of the culture of Oaxaca. The bottom left corner of the middle panel illustrates a parade with brass instruments, colorful Huipil blouses of the Isthmus of Tehuantepec, and a flute player. He wears purple, the color representing the conservative militia of the War of Independence (1810-1821).

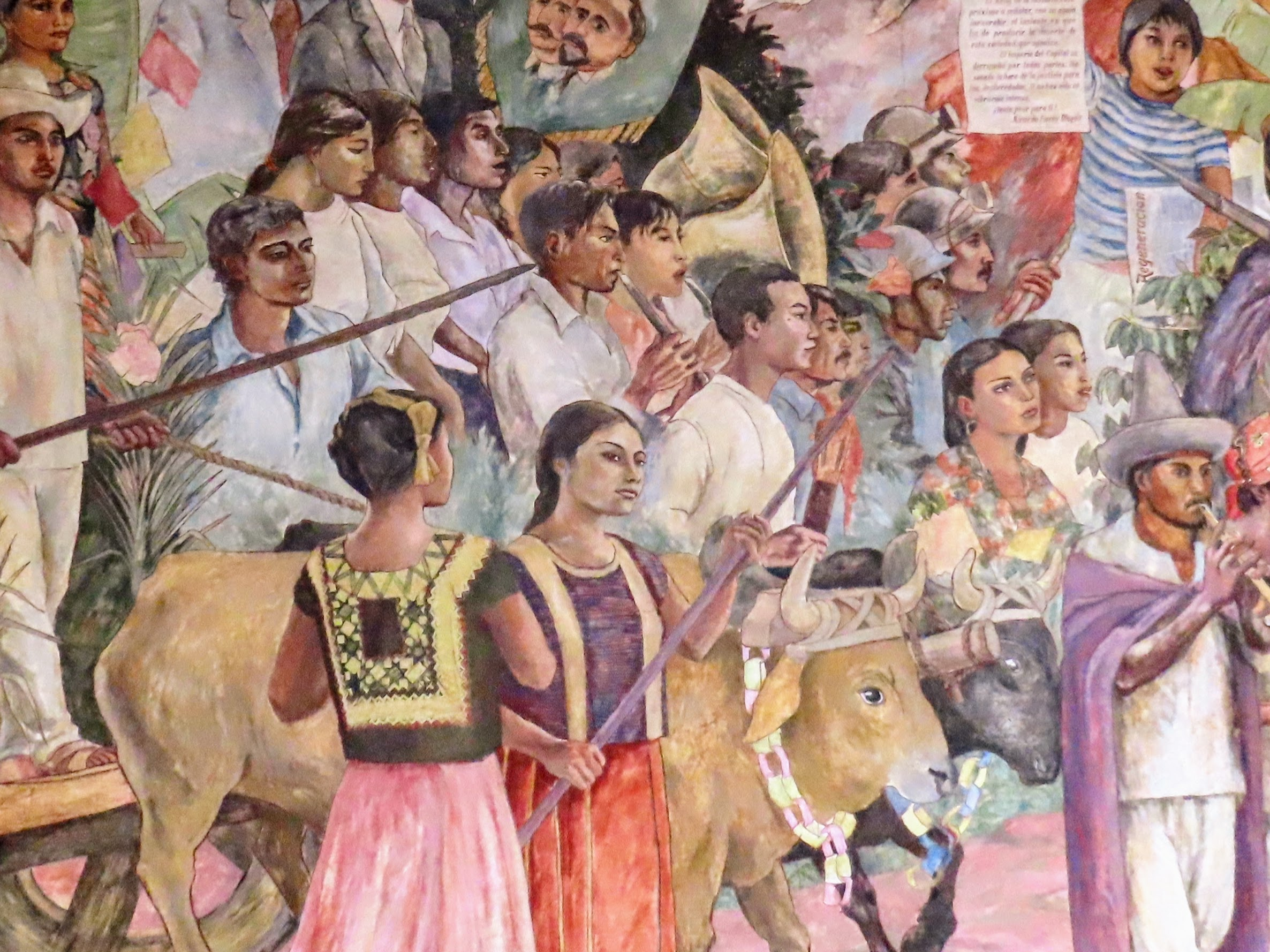
Isthmus parade

=== Conclusion ===
Oaxaca has a rich and varied history. Constant conflict between liberal and conservative values has frequently surfaced, contributing to five civil wars and sometimes chaotic politics. National leaders such as José Vasconcelos, Porfirio Díaz and Benito Juarez, all with Oaxacan roots provided leadership to the nation in times of turmoil. In the mural Garcia Bustos portrays the conflicts that have risen in Oaxaca, from a liberal perspective, for example focusing on the deeds of Benito Juárez rather than Porfirio Díaz.

The mural is a remarkable map of Oaxacan history, a herculean achievement by a skilled artist, well-versed in the history of Mexico and Oaxaca.
