= Constituent assembly =

Body of representatives convened to draft or adopt a new constitution

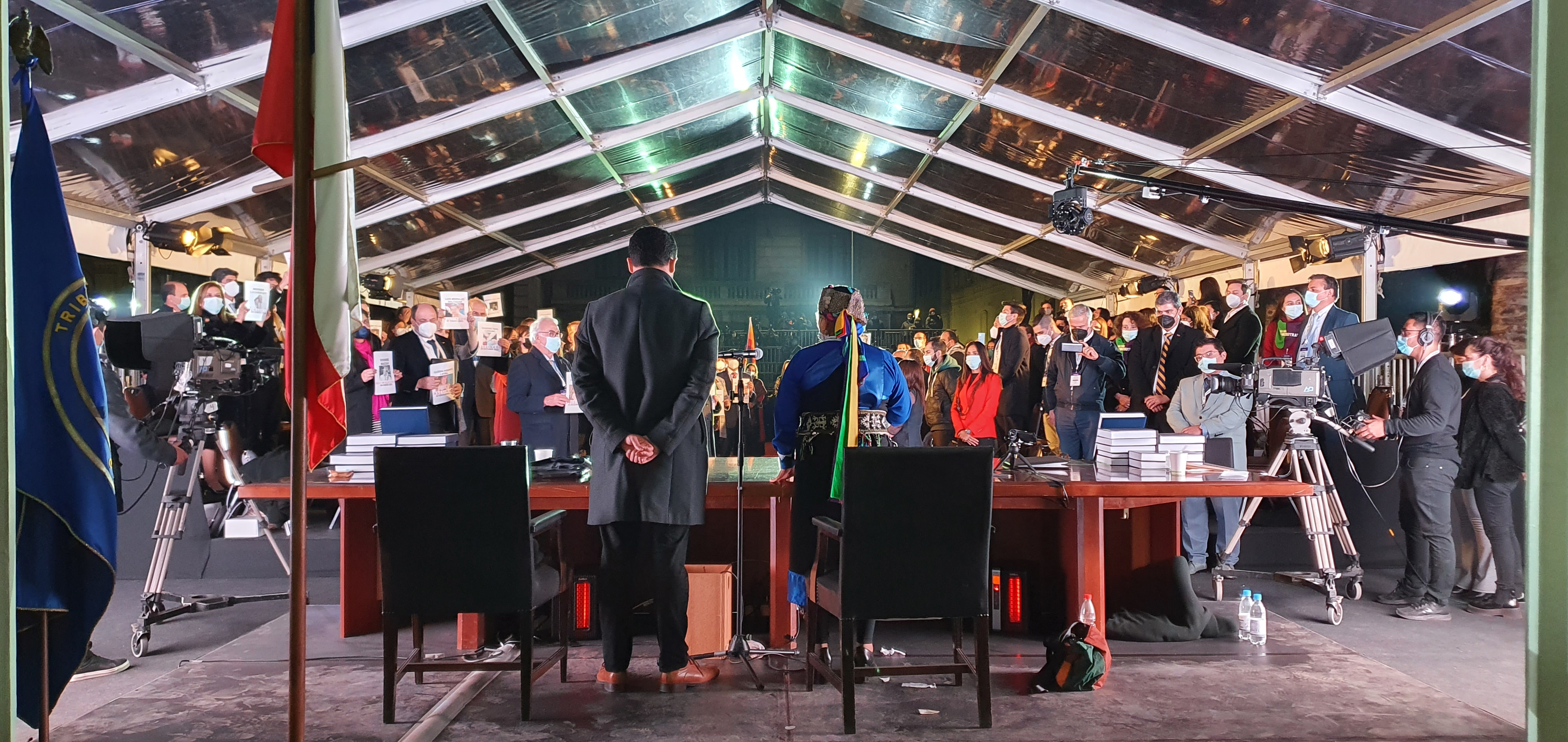
Opening session of the 2021 Chilean constitutional convention

A constituent assembly (also known as a constitutional convention, constitutional congress, or constitutional assembly) is a body assembled for the purpose of drafting or revising a constitution. Members of a constituent assembly may be elected by popular vote, drawn by sortition, appointed, or some combination of these methods. Assemblies are typically considered distinct from a regular legislature, although members of the legislature may compose a significant number or all of its members. As the fundamental document constituting a state, a constitution cannot normally be modified or amended by the state's normal legislative procedures in some jurisdictions; instead a constitutional convention or a constituent assembly, the rules for which are normally laid down in the constitution, must be set up. A constituent assembly is usually set up for its specific purpose, which it carries out in a relatively short time, after which the assembly is dissolved. A constituent assembly is a form of representative democracy.

Unlike forms of constitution-making in which a constitution is unilaterally imposed by a sovereign lawmaker, the constituent assembly creates a constitution through "internally imposed" actions, in that members of the constituent assembly are themselves citizens, but not necessarily the political leaders, of the country for which they are creating a constitution. As described by Columbia University Social Sciences Professor Jon Elster:

"Constitutions arise in a number of different ways. At the non-democratic extreme of the spectrum, we may imagine a sovereign lawgiver laying down the constitution for all later generations. At the democratic extreme, we may imagine a constituent assembly elected by universal suffrage for the sole task of writing a new constitution. And there are all sorts of intermediate arrangements."

== By country ==
=== Australia ===
Australia held four constitutional conventions, one each in 1891, 1897, 1973, and 1998.

=== Bangladesh ===
The Constituent Assembly of Bangladesh was the first and, to date, the only constitution-making body of Bangladesh, convened in 1972 by the government of Sheikh Mujibur Rahman following the country's independence. It comprised representatives elected in the national and provincial council elections of Pakistan held in 1970. As the assembly was formed with representatives elected under the Legal Framework Order, 1970, issued by Pakistan's then-military ruler and President Yahya Khan, several political parties and political leaders, including Maulana Abdul Hamid Khan Bhashani, Badruddin Umar, A.S.M. Abdur Rab, Farhad Mazhar, and others, have labeled this assembly as illegitimate. However, despite the controversies and opposition, Sheikh Mujib's uncompromising leadership enabled the Constituent Assembly to draft and enact the Constitution in less than a year. However, from the time of its drafting until today, the constitution has been often labelled as "fascist" and criticized for fostering autocracy and failing to adequately safeguard human rights.

In the aftermath of Non-cooperation movement (2024), the Interim government of Bangladesh is mulling over convening a new constituent assembly to draft a new inclusive democratic constitution, ensuring the inviolability of human dignity.

=== Chile ===
As of May 2021 Chile is the most recently elected constitutional assembly. The 155 members of this assembly were elected between 15 and 16 May 2021. The assembly has gender parity (50% females and 50% males) and has 17 seats reserved for people belonging to indigenous peoples. The assembly is granted 12 months to draft a new constitution, which has to be ratified by referendum once written, with compulsory voting.

=== Costa Rica ===
Immediately after the 1948 Costa Rican Civil War that overthrew the Rafael Angel Calderón Government, the leaders of the victorious side called for the election of a Constituent Assembly in the same year. The Assembly successfully drafted and approved the current Costa Rican Constitution.

=== Denmark ===
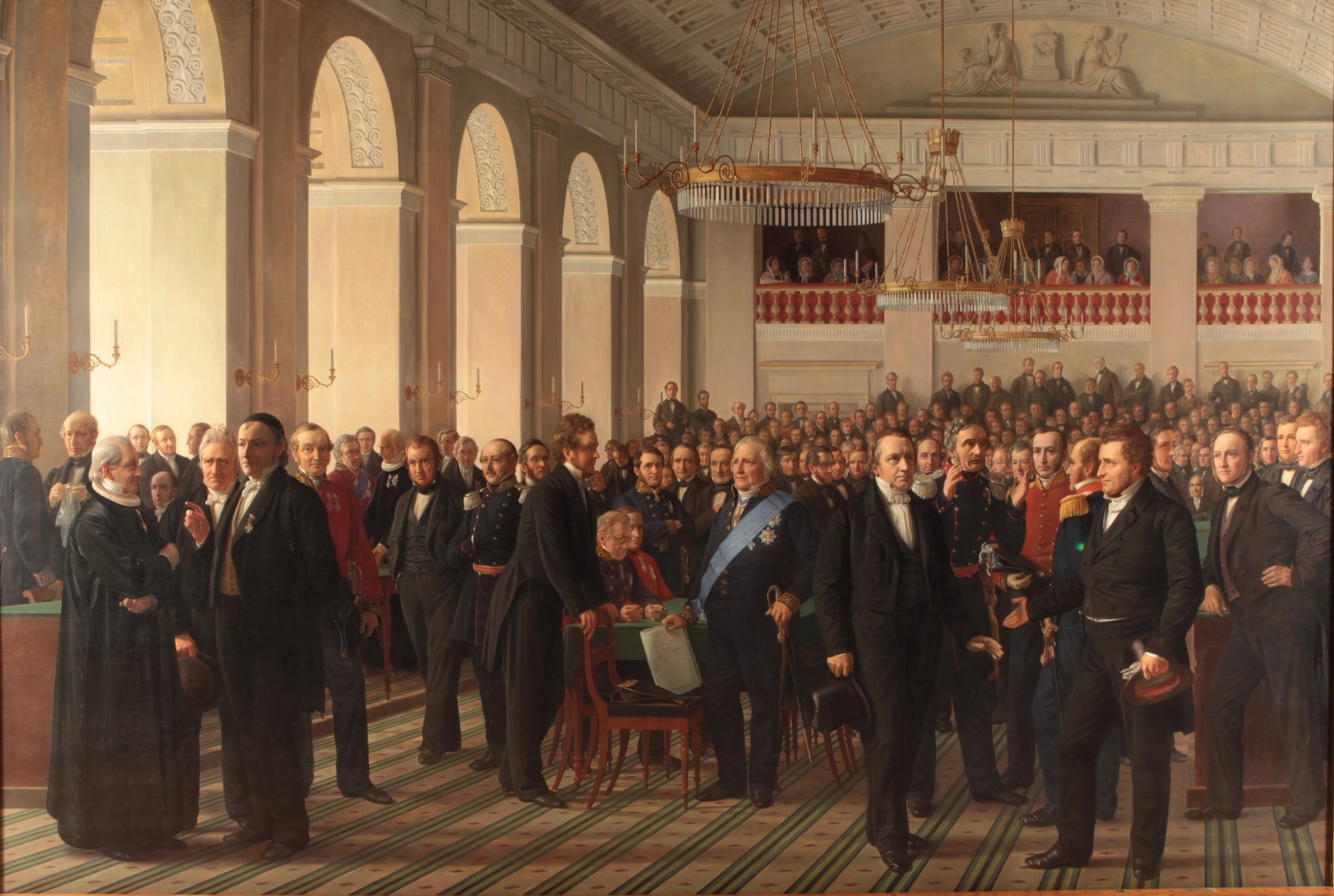
The Danish Constituent Assembly. Painting by Constantin Hansen (1864).

The Danish Constituent Assembly (Danish: Den Grundlovgivende Rigsforsamling; lit. The Constitution giving Assembly of the Realm) of 1848 established the Constitution of Denmark in 1849 (Danish: Danmarks Riges Grundlov; lit. The Constitutional Act of the Realm of Denmark) and formalized the transition from absolute monarchy to constitutional monarchy. The assembly consisted of members of which 114 were directly elected in October 1848, 38 were appointed by the king and the rest were government ministers. The constituent assembly met at Christiansborg Palace in Copenhagen and first met on 23 October 1848. The assembly was overall split in three different groupings: the National liberals, the Friends of Peasants, and the Conservatives. A key topic for discussion was the political system, and the rules governing elections. On 25 May 1849, the constituent assembly approved the new constitution, and on 5 June 1849 it was signed by King Frederick VII. For this reason, it is also known as the June constitution. Today, 5 June is known as Constitution Day in Denmark.

=== European Union ===
The European Convention (2001) drafted the Constitution for Europe for approval by the European Council and ratification by the member states. This constitution was abandoned after being rejected in French and Dutch referendums, and was replaced by the Treaty of Lisbon in 2007.

=== France ===
During the French Revolution (from July 1789 to September 1791) a National Constituent Assembly (Assemblée nationale constituante) was formed when representatives assembled at the only location available – a tennis court – and swore the Tennis Court Oath on June 20, 1789, promising that they would not adjourn until they had drafted a new constitution for France. Louis XVI recognized the validity of the National Constituent Assembly on June 27, 1789.

See also 1848 French Constituent Assembly election.

=== Germany ===
Parlamentarischer Rat (Parliamentary Council) (1948) – Drafted the Basic Law of the Federal Republic for ratification by the Länder. This council was not recognized as legitimate by Soviet-occupied East Germany, which drafted its own constitution in 1949 and would not accept the Basic Law until German reunification in 1990.

=== Iceland ===
On 27 November 2010, Iceland held an election for a constitutional assembly, with 522 people competing for 25 delegate seats. The assembly, in session for four months from early April until late July 2011, drafted a new constitution and passed it unanimously with 25 votes and no abstentions. On 20 October 2012 the parliament put the bill to a national referendum, in which 67% of the voters supported the bill. Further, 67% of the voters supported equal voting rights (one person, one vote) and 83% supported national ownership of natural resources, two key provisions of the bill. Parliament has failed to ratify the bill, however, inviting accusations that the political class is trying to thwart the will of the people by disrespecting the result of the 2012 constitutional referendum.

=== Ireland ===
In September 1922 the 3rd Dáil enacted the Irish Free State Constitution while "sitting as a Constituent Assembly in this Provisional Parliament". The Dáil had been elected in June 1922 as a provisional parliament to which the Provisional Government established in January 1922 was responsible. When the Free State Constitution came into force in December 1922, the 3rd Dáil continued as the lower house of the Free State Oireachtas (parliament). Whether the Oireachtas had unlimited power to amend the Constituent Assembly's enactment became a matter of legal and political controversy in the 1930s.

The 8th Dáil, elected in 1933, finalised the draft Constitution of Ireland in 1937, although the Dáil was seldom described in this context as a "constituent assembly". Éamon de Valera, the instigator of the 1937 Constitution, stated, "The only way in which you can get a Constitution is to get the people themselves to enact it or get them to elect a Constituent Assembly to enact it". In his view, "the people themselves" enacted the constitution when the Dáil's draft was approved by a plebiscite on 1 July 1937.

Other Irish constitutional conventions have met. The 2012–2014 Constitutional Convention was a quasi citizens' assembly which proposed various changes to law; of those involving amending the constitution, the then government accepted six, three of which were put to referendum, of which two passed.

=== India ===
The Constituent Assembly of India was elected to write the Constitution of India, and served as its first Parliament as an independent nation. It was set up as a result of negotiations between the leaders of the Indian independence movement and members of the British Cabinet Mission. The constituent assembly was elected indirectly by the members of the Provincial legislative assembly, which existed under the British Raj. It first met on December 9, 1946, in Delhi. On August 15, 1947, India became an independent nation, and the Constituent Assembly started functioning as India's Parliament. Dr. B.R. Ambedkar drafted the Constitution of India in conjunction with the requisite deliberations and debates in the Constituent Assembly. The Assembly approved the Constitution on November 26, 1949 (celebrated as Constitution Day), and it took effect on January 26, 1950 — a day now commemorated as Republic Day in India. Once the Constitution took effect, the Constituent Assembly became the Provisional Parliament of India.

=== Indonesia ===
The Constitutional Assembly of Indonesia was established to draw up a permanent constitution. Its membership was elected in November 1955, and it met for the first time in November 1956. After four sessions, it failed to agree on the fundamental basis for the state. It was dissolved in 1959, and the original constitution imposed by presidential decree.(OTP)

=== Italy ===
The Constituent Assembly of Italy was established in 1946 in the wake of Fascist Italy's defeat during World War II. It was elected with universal suffrage, simultaneously with a referendum about the adoption of Republic or the continuation of monarchy. Voters chose Republic, and the new assembly had the task to approve the new republic governments, as well as to write a new constitution. This was approved on 22 December 1947.

It was dissolved on 31 January 1948, to be replaced by the new Parliament of Italy.

=== Mexico ===
The Viceroyalty of New Spain sent deputies to the Cortes of Cadiz, which enacted the 1812 Constitution. By the time this Constitution was enacted, an insurgency fighting for independence from Spain was already established.

The first Constituent Congress of independent Mexico, known as the Congress of Anahuac, was first gathered in Chilpancingo whilst the war of independence was still ongoing. During the opening of Congress, José María Morelos outlined its program in a document called Sentimientos de la Nación (Feelings of the Nation), which was the first antecedent of the various Constitutions of Mexico. Being persecuted by royalist troops, the Congress fled Chilpancingo and gathered in Apatzingán.

On October 22, 1814, the Congress enacted the Constitutional Decree for the Liberty of Mexican America (Decreto Constitucional para la Libertad de la América Mexicana), known as the Constitution of Apatzingán. The 1814 Constitution entered into force in the territories dominated by the insurgents, but as the war continued and the first insurgent leaders (like Morelos) were defeated, it was largely forgotten.

After independence was consummated on September 27, 1821, and based on the Plan de Iguala and the Treaty of Córdoba, the Provisional Governing Junta was stablished. The Junta proclaimed the Act of Independence of the Mexican Empire and acted as a de facto legislative assembly until February 24, 1822, when the Constituent Congress was gathered. On May 19, 1822, the Constituent Congress proclaimed Agustín de Iturbide as Emperor. The relations between Emperor and Congress were always problematic, a situation that led to the dissolution of Congress by Iturbide on October 31, 1822, without a formal Constitution being enacted.

After the dissolution of Congress, Iturbide created the National Instituent Junta, which enacted the Provisional Political Bylaws of the Mexican Empire on December 18, 1822. The dissolution of Congress had resulted in an armed revolution under the Plan de Casa Mata, which called for the establishment of a Federal Republic and for the restoration of the Constituent Congress. Iturbide was forced to abdicate and he reinstalled the Constituent Congress.

The Congress then created a provisional government, called the Triumvirate, and enacted the Constituent Act of the Mexican Federation, by which the former Provinces of Mexico were transformed into free and sovereign States. After this, a Constituent Congress was formed with the participation of the States and it enacted the 1824 Constitution.

Many disputes aroused between federalists and centralists, which resulted in political instability and in 1836 the Siete Leyes (Seven Laws) were enacted. The Siete Leyes dissolved the federation and created a unitary republic, but that ended in 1846 when the Constitutive and Reforms Act was enacted and the 1824 Constitution, and thus the federation, was restored.

On October 16, 1854, President Juan Álvarez, under the Plan de Ayutla, decreed the formation of another Constituent Congress, which met in 1856. During the presidency of Ignacio Comonfort, the Constituent Congress enacted the 1857 Constitution, which was liberal in character. The Constitution was not well received by the church and Mexican conservatives, and the Plan de Tacubaya called for its derogation. This events led to the Reform War, which the liberals won, then restoring the 1857 Constitution and adding to it the Reform Laws.

After the Porfiriato, and whilst the Mexican Revolution was still being fought, President Venustiano Carranza formed a Constituent Congress, which met in Querétaro and enacted the still-current Political Constitution of the United Mexican States of 1917.

=== Nepal ===
Nepal had two Constituent assemblies, the last one being elected after its predecessor failed to deliver a constitution, despite multiple extensions. It also served as the country's parliament. Finally Nepal had made constitution with 89% majority. Nepal has adopted federalism since.

=== Poland ===
The Great Sejm (also known as Four-Year Sejm) was held between 1788 and 1792. Its principal aim became to restore sovereignty to, and reform, the federative Polish-Lithuanian Commonwealth politically and economically. These attempts were made by writing Constitution of 3 May 1791 that was designed to redress long-standing political defects of the Commonwealth and its system of Golden Liberties. The constitution lasted for merely a year because of the Polish-Russian War of 1792 and the Third Partition of Poland.

=== Philippines ===
The Philippines has had several conventions:

- 1898 – drafted the 1898 Malolos Constitution, the basic law of the First Philippine Republic, the first constitutional republic in Asia. The drafted constitution was written by Felipe Calderón y Roca and Felipe Buencamino as an alternative to a pair of proposals to the Malolos Congress by Apolinario Mabini and Pedro Paterno. After a lengthy debate in the latter part of 1898, it was enacted on 21 January 1899.
- 1935 – to draft a constitution to create the autonomous Commonwealth of the Philippines under the U.S. Tydings–McDuffie Act. The constitution was also used in the 3rd Republic (1946) until the passage of the 1973 constitution. Members were elected through the 1934 Philippine Constitutional Convention election
- 1971 – to draft a revised constitution to replace the old U.S. 1935 Philippine constitution. Members were elected through the 1970 Philippine Constitutional Convention election. The system of government changed from presidential to parliamentary to presidential-parliamentary (in 1984 amendment).
- 1986 – The ex-constitution lasted until the downfall of Ferdinand Marcos in 1986 and Corazon Aquino appointed members to draft the 1987 Constitution through the 1986 Commission.

=== Russia ===
The Russian Constituent Assembly was established in Russia in the wake of the October Revolution of 1917 to form a new constitution after the overthrow of the Russian Provisional Government.

=== Sri Lanka ===
The Sri Lankan Parliament approved the creation of a Sri Lanka Constitutional Assembly on March 9, 2016, proposed by Prime Minister Ranil Wickramasinghe. The assembly will draft a new constitution for Sri Lanka.

=== Turkey ===
Constituent Assembly of Turkey was established in 1961 after the 1960 Turkish coup d'état to prepare a democratic constitution. The constitution was prepared and approved by the voters in a referendum of 1961.

=== United States ===
==== Federal ====
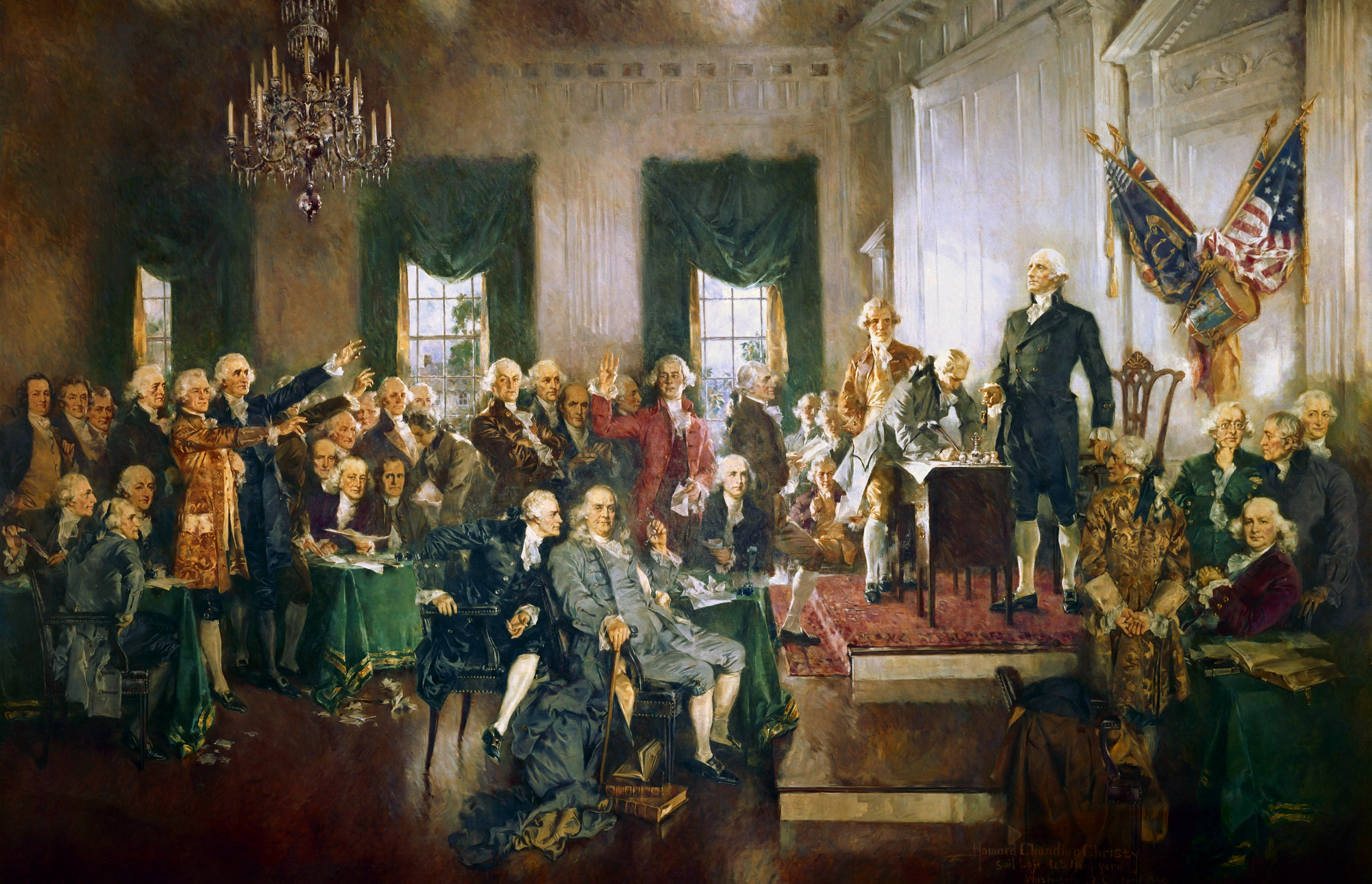
Scene at the Signing of the Constitution of the United States, by Howard Chandler Christy (1940)

The U.S. Constitutional Convention drafted the still-current United States Constitution in 1787. Its delegates were appointed by the states, not directly elected, and not all states sent delegates; moreover, the convention was originally charged with drafting amendments to the Articles of Confederation rather than a new constitution.

The US Constitution contains no provision for its own replacement (and because of the presence of entrenched clauses it cannot be revoked through an amendment). Article V of the Constitution does permit Congress to appoint a national constitutional convention to propose amendments but it has never done so. While Congress has the option to submit both its own proposals for amendments and those of a national convention to state conventions rather than the state legislatures for ratification; this process has been used only once (for the Twenty-first Amendment).

==== States ====
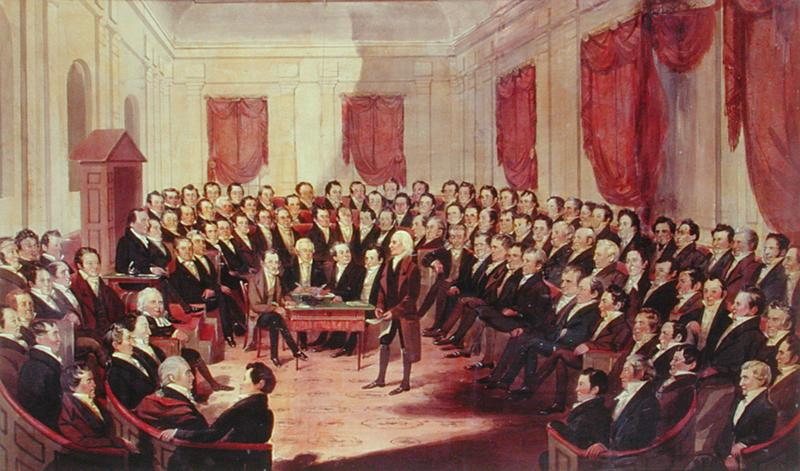
The Virginia Constitutional Convention, 1830 (George Catlin, c. 1830). Many state constituent assemblies, like the 1830 Virginia Constitutional Convention, were highly formalized but the legitimacy of the constitution they drafted depended on whether it was authorized by the people, not whether a particular procedure was followed.

A long tradition in the use of constituent assemblies exists at the state level of Constitutionalism. In fact, constituent assemblies met in the states before the formation of the Federal Constitution in 1787 as well as after its ratification. Since 1776 nearly 150 state constitutional conventions have met to draft or revise state constitutions.

These early state constitutional conventions frequently did not use procedural steps like popular ratification that became commonplace in the mid-19th century. Yet they were considered to be constituent assemblies that exercised their authority as that of the people. As American Sovereigns: The People and America's Constitutional Tradition Before the Civil War by Christian G. Fritz notes:.

"A legitimate constitution depended on whether the sovereign people authorized it, not whether a particular procedure was used or whether revolutionary conventions were free of other responsibilities, such as passing ordinary legislation. It was the people as the sovereign who authorized drafting those first [state] constitutions that gave them their legitimacy, not whether they used procedures that matched what was later understood to be necessary to create fundamental law."

American state constituent assemblies in the 19th and 20th centuries reflected many qualities of a citizen's movement. From the start of state American constitution-making, delegates to constitutional conventions studied earlier state models of constitutions. They often self-consciously "borrow[ed]" constitutional text and provisions from other states. They often used in their drafting and debates compact and pocket-sized compilations of all the existing American constitutions, so that the constituent's assembly could draw upon the latest in constitutional design. The powers of these state constituent assemblies were also highly contested, with some claiming that they had unlimited legal power and others claiming that they must operate within the pre-existing legal landscape. In the end, a common law of constituent power emerged which held that elected constituent assemblies had limited powers.

Several U.S. states have held multiple conventions over the years to change their particular state's constitutions.

- Missouri has held six, in 1820, 1845, 1865, 1875, 1922, and 1945.
- Michigan has held four, in 1835, 1850, 1908 and 1963.
- Massachusetts has held six, in 1778, 1779–80, 1820–21, 1853, 1917–18, and most recently 2016.
- The Constitution of New York has been amended, or re-established de novo, through nine Constitutional Conventions: in 1776–1777, 1801, 1821, 1846, 1867–1868, 1894, 1915, 1938, and 1967; a Constitutional Commission in 1872–1873; and a Judicial Convention in 1921.
- Vermont's first constitution was drafted by a convention that met in July 1777 and revised by a convention that met in 1786, both of these conventions occurring when Vermont was still independent of the United States. Vermont was admitted into the United States in 1791 and its government continued to function under the 1786 constitution. Two years later in 1793 held another convention to bring some provisions of its constitution into line with the Constitution of the United States.
- Virginia Conventions have included six unlimited meetings. Constitutions were promulgated by fiat in 1776, 1864 and 1901–02, and ratified by referendum in 1829–30, 1850, and 1868. Limited Conventions and Constitutional Commissions resulting in revisions were held in 1927, 1945, 1956 and 1968. Subsequently, the state legislature proposes amendments that are ratified in popular referendum.

==== State constitutional conventions ====
All 50 states have had at least one Constitutional Convention, numbering over 233. 11 were illegal and defeated by arms (Confederacy and Dorr's Rebellion). 12 were illegal and won through arms (Revolutionary War, Republic of Texas, and Vermont Republic). 37 were made in accordance with a Federal enabling law.

State	Constitutional conventions																
Alabama	1819	1861	1865	1867	1875	1901											
Alaska	1955–56																
Arizona	1910																
Arkansas	1836	1861	1864	1868	1874	1917–18	1969–70	1978–80									
California	1849	1878–79															
Colorado	1864	1865	1875–76														
Connecticut	1818	1902	1965														
Delaware	1776	1792	1831	1853	1897												
Florida	1838–39	1861	1865	1868	1885												
Georgia	1777	1788	1789	1789	1789	1795	1798	1833	1839	1861	1865	1868	1877				
Hawaii	1950	1968	1978														
Idaho	1889																
Illinois	1818	1847	1862	1869–70	1920–22	1969–70											
Indiana	1815	1850–51															
Iowa	1844	1846	1857														
Kansas	1855	1857	1858	1859													
Kentucky	1792	1799	1849–50	1890–91													
Louisiana	1812	1845	1852	1861	1864	1868	1879	1898	1913	1921	1973–74						
Maine	1819																
Maryland	1776	1850–51	1864	1867	1967–68												
Massachusetts	1779–80	1820	1853	1917–19													
Michigan	1835	1850	1867	1907–08	1961–62												
Minnesota	1857																
Mississippi	1817	1832	1851	1861	1865	1868	1890										
Missouri	1820	1845-6	1861–63	1865	1875	1922–23	1943–44										
Montana	1866	1884	1889	1971–72													
Nebraska	1871	1875	1919–20														
Nevada	1863	1864															
New Hampshire	1776	1778–79	1781–83	1791–92	1850–51	1876	1889	1902	1912	1918–23	1930	1938–41	1948	1956–59	1964	1974	1984
New Jersey	1844	1947	1966														
New Mexico	1848	1849	1850	1889–90	1907	1910	1969										
New York	1776–77	1801	1821	1846	1867	1894	1915	1938	1967								
North Carolina	1776	1835	1861–62	1865–66	1868	1875											
North Dakota	1889	1971–72															
Ohio	1802	1850–51	1873	1912													
Oklahoma	1906–07																
Oregon	1857																
Pennsylvania	1776	1789–90	1837–38	1872–73	1967–68												
Rhode Island	1841	1842	1944	1951	1955	1958	1964–69	1973	1986								
South Carolina	1790	1861	1865	1868	1895												
South Dakota	1883	1885	1889														
Tennessee	1796	1834	1870	1953	1959	1965	1971	1977									
Texas	1836	1845	1861	1866	1868–69	1876	1974										
Utah	1895																
Vermont	1777	1786	1793	1814	1822	1828	1836	1843	1850	1857	1870						
Virginia	1776	1829–30	1850–51	1861	1864	1867–68	1901–02	1945	1956								
Washington	1878	1889															
West Virginia	1861–63	1872															
Wisconsin	1846	1847–48															
Wyoming	1889																

==== Legislative restrictions surpassed ====
State legislatures put restrictions on conventions that were not followed in these cases.

- Georgia 1789 proposed alternatives instead of accepting or rejecting a constitution.
- Illinois 1862 and 1869 disregarded a requirement for an oath.
- New York 1867 worked past its deadline and submitted its work later.
- Pennsylvania 1872 against restriction altered the Bill of Rights.
- Alabama 1901 increase delegate pay above limit.
- Michigan 1908 submitted its work in November not April.

== Countries without an entrenched constitution ==
A few countries do not have an entrenched constitution, which can thus be amended by normal legislative procedures; the United Kingdom, New Zealand and Israel are examples. In these countries there is no need to call constituent assemblies, and no provision to do so, as the legislature can effectively modify the constitution.

Although it lacks a written constitution, the United Kingdom has had several conventions at the subnational level including:

- Northern Ireland Constitutional Convention (1975–1976) – a failed attempt to find a solution to the status of Northern Ireland.
- Scottish Constitutional Convention (1989) – produced a plan for Scottish devolution.

The constitution of New Zealand consists of a collection of statutes (Acts of Parliament), Treaties, Orders-in-Council, Letters Patent, decisions of the Courts and unwritten constitutional conventions. Because it is not supreme law, the constitution is comparatively easy to reform, requiring only a majority of Members of Parliament to amend it.

The constitutional law of Israel is determined by the Knesset which, since 1949, serves as the country's ongoing constituent assembly. The Knesset has the power to create Basic Laws of Israel, laws which are entrenched legislation and will become part of a "future" constitution of Israel, as well as "regular" statutory legislation.

== See also ==
- List of constituent assemblies
- Constitutional Commission
- Convention parliament
- Constituent Cortes
- National Constituent Assembly (disambiguation)
- 3rd Dáil, also called the Constituent Assembly
