= Vicente Guerrero =

President of Mexico in 1829

The Most Excellent Vicente Guerrero General de División del Ejército Mexicano
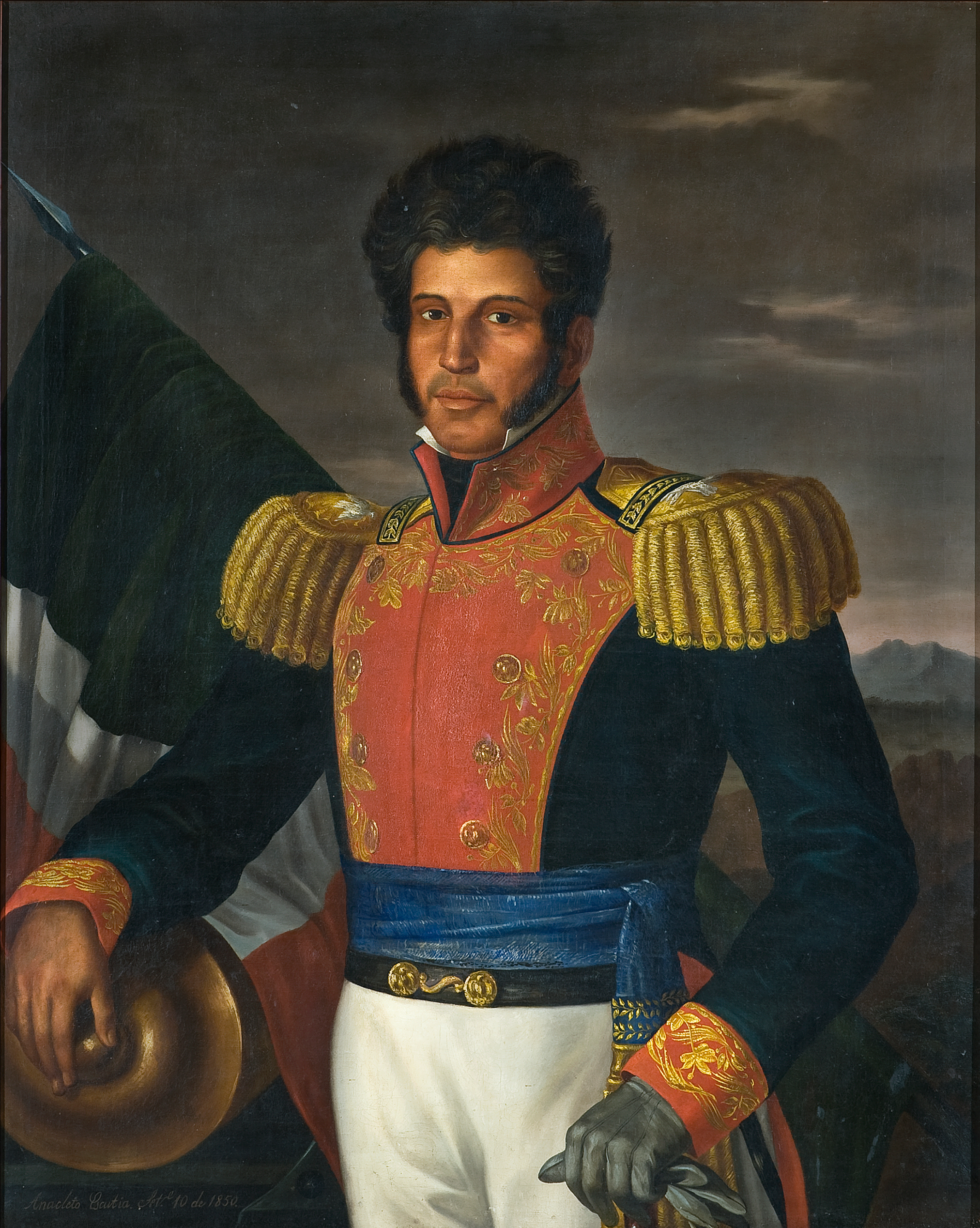
- A half-length, posthumous portrait by Anacleto Escutia (1850), Museo Nacional de Historia. An inscription on the reverse side of the painting claims it is a "copy of an original which belongs to the Excellent Ayuntamiento of Mexico."

2nd President of Mexico
- In office 1 April – 17 December 1829
- Vice President: Anastasio Bustamante
- Preceded by: Guadalupe Victoria
- Succeeded by: José María Bocanegra

Minister of War and Navy
- In office 8 – 25 December 1828
- President: Guadalupe Victoria
- Preceded by: José Castro
- Succeeded by: Francisco Moctezuma

Member of the Supreme Executive Power
- In office 1 April 1823 – 10 October 1824
- Preceded by: Constitutional Monarchy; Agustín I
- Succeeded by: Federal Republic; Guadalupe Victoria

Commander-in-chief of the Insurgent Forces
- In office 1820–1821
- Appointed by: Junta Subalterna
- Succeeded by: Command merged into the Army of the Three Guarantees

Personal details
- Born: Vicente Ramón Guerrero; 10 August 1782 (baptism date) Tixtla, Kingdom of Mexico, Viceroyalty of New Spain
- Died: 14 February 1831 (aged 48) Cuilapan, Oaxaca, Mexico
- Cause of death: Execution by firing squad
- Resting place: Column of Independence
- Party: Liberal
- Spouse: María Guadalupe Hernández
- Children: 2
- Relatives: Vicente Riva Palacio (grandson)
- Occupation: Military officer; politician

Military service
- Allegiance: Mexican Insurgent Army; Army of the Three Guarantees; Mexico
- Branch/service: Mexican Army
- Years of service: 1810–1831
- Rank: Division general
- Battles/wars: Mexican War of Independence; Battle of El Veladero; Siege of Cuautla; Battle of Izúcar; Siege of Huajuapan de León; Battle of Zitlala; Capture of Oaxaca; Siege of Acapulco; Battle of Cañada de Los Naranjos; Battle of El Tamo; Battle of Barrabás Hill; Battle of Agua Zarca; Battle of Zapotepec; Casa Mata Plan Revolution; Battle of Almolonga; Nicolas Bravo's rebellion; Battle of Tulancingo; Spanish attempts to reconquer Mexico; Southern War

Vicente Ramón Guerrero Saldaña (Spanish: [biˈsente raˈmoŋ ɡeˈreɾo]; baptized 10 August 1782 – 14 February 1831) was a Mexican military officer, guerrilla commander, and statesman who played a central role in the Mexican War of Independence and served as the nation's second president in 1829. Later official memory has also styled him a consummator of independence and a founder of the First Mexican Republic.

Born in Tixtla to a family of modest means, he worked as an arriero before joining the insurgent army of José María Morelos in late 1810. Assigned to deal with local Indigenous communities, he used Spanish and Indigenous languages to recruit and hold support in Morelos's southern campaign. After Morelos's capture and execution in December 1815, Guerrero became one of the last major insurgent commanders still in the field and, from 1816 to 1821, kept the war alive by guerrilla warfare in the Tierra Caliente, refusing viceregal offers of pardon. In early 1821, with the restored Constitution of Cádiz unsettling New Spain and with royalist columns unable to finish him, Guerrero and Agustín de Iturbide opened talks. Guerrero’s terms were total independence and citizenship without caste distinction; Iturbide issued those terms, with a Catholic establishment and a constitutional monarchy, in the Plan of Iguala of 24 February 1821. Their combined troops formed the Ejército Trigarante and entered Mexico City on 27 September 1821, consummating independence.

Guerrero accepted the First Mexican Empire, but when Iturbide dissolved Congress, he joined the republican rising that forced the latter's abdication and later served on the provisional Supreme Executive Power. In the 1828 presidential election the state legislatures chose the moderate Manuel Gómez Pedraza and revolts in favor of Guerrero soon followed including by Antonio López de Santa Anna in Veracruz. As unrest and sacking continued in the capital Gómez Pedraza resigned and fled the country. Congress annulled the vote and named Guerrero president, with Anastasio Bustamante as vice president; the term began on 1 April 1829.

Facing a Spanish reconquest landing, Congress granted him facultades extraordinarias. He used them, among other acts, to abolish slavery on 15 September 1829. On 4 December 1829 Bustamante's reserve army pronounced the Plan of Jalapa. Guerrero was deposed on 17 December, retreated to his Independence War stronghold in the south, and waged the Guerra del Sur with allies including Juan Álvarez. Betrayed and seized at Acapulco in January 1831, he was condemned by a summary court-martial and shot at Cuilapan, Oaxaca, on 14 February 1831. Liberals denounced the execution as judicial murder; the main southern rebellion collapsed with him.

== Early life ==
Vicente Guerrero was born in Tixtla, a town approximately 100 kilometers inland from the port of Acapulco, in the Sierra Madre del Sur. He was the son of María Guadalupe Rodríguez Saldaña, and Juan Pedro Guerrero. His father's family included landowners, affluent farmers, traders with broad business connections in Southern Mexico, members of the Spanish militia, gunsmiths, and cannon manufacturers. During his youth, Guerrero worked for his father's prosperous mule-driven freight business, which provided him the opportunity to travel across Mexico. His travels exposed him to emerging ideas of independence and dissent against Spanish rule.

Guerrero's ethnic origins have been a subject of debate, with some historians suggesting he was of mixed African heritage. However, no portraits of him were made during his lifetime and those made posthumously may not be reliable. Fellow insurgent José María Morelos described Guerrero as a "young man with bronzed or tanned skin (broncineo in Spanish), tall and strong, with an aquiline nose, bright, light-colored eyes, and prominent sideburns". He was often supported by the indigenous people throughout the Revolution.

Vicente's father, Juan Pedro Guerrero, was a supporter of the Spanish rule, while his uncle, Diego Guerrero, held a prominent position in the Spanish militia. As an adult, Vicente was opposed to the Spanish colonial government. In December 1810, Guerrero enlisted in José María Morelos's insurgent army in southern Mexico, beginning his career as a revolutionary leader. He was married to María Guadalupe Hernández, and they had a daughter, María Dolores Guerrero Hernández. María Dolores married Mariano Riva Palacio, who was the defense lawyer for Maximilian I of Mexico in Querétaro, and was the mother of the late nineteenth-century intellectual Vicente Riva Palacio.

== Insurgent ==
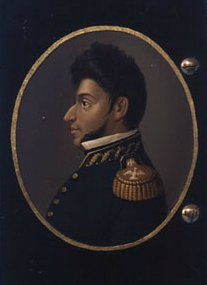
Profile portrait of Vicente Guerrero on an early 19th-century snuffbox (enamelled brass on lacquered wood)

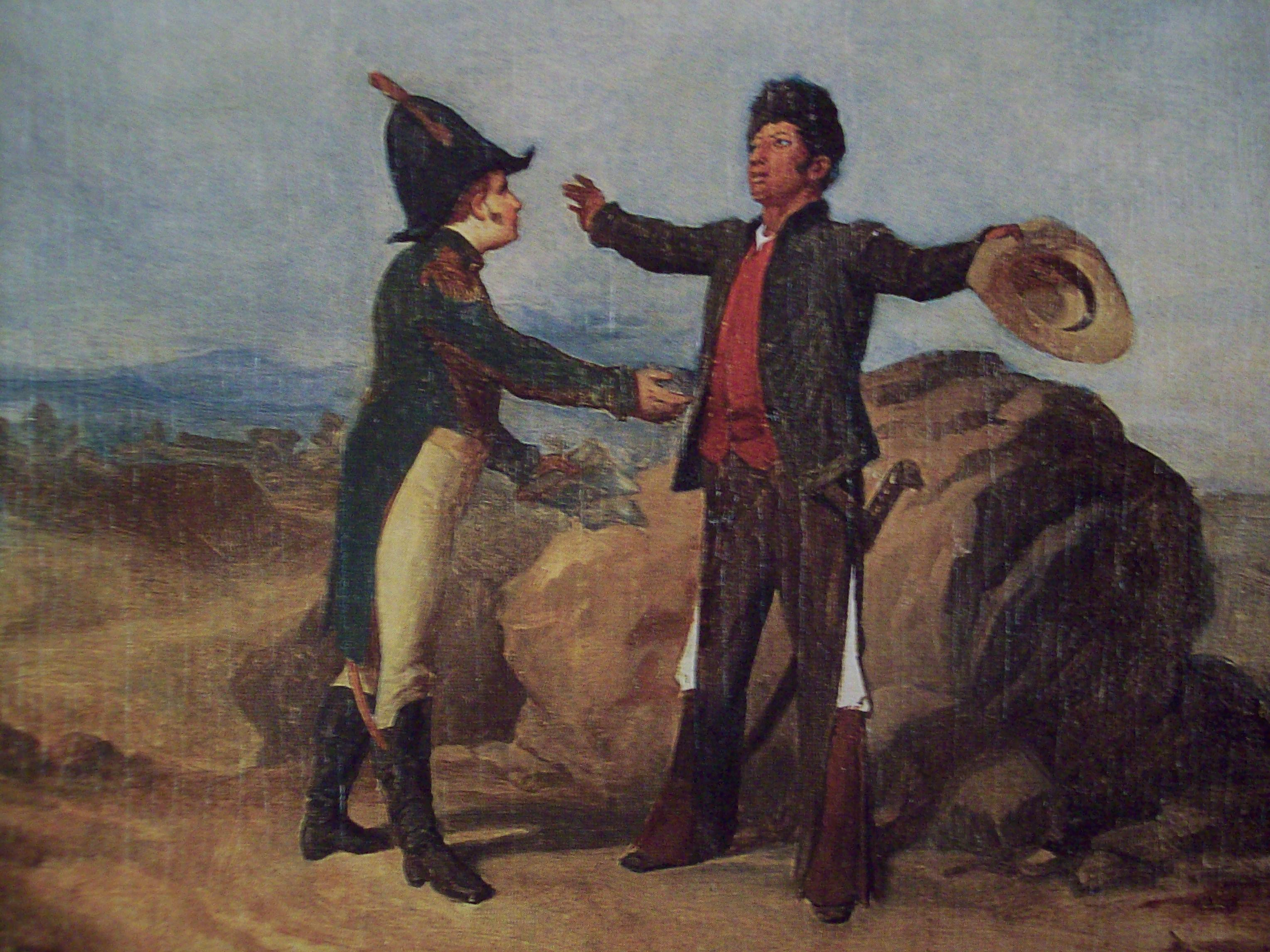
Abrazo of Acatempan, between Guerrero and Iturbide, Ramón Sagredo, 1870, oil on canvas

In 1810, Guerrero joined in the early revolt against Spain, first fighting in the forces of secular priest José María Morelos. When the Mexican War of Independence began, Guerrero was working as a muleteer and in an armory, in Tixtla, when the revolution started. He joined the rebellion in November 1810 and enlisted in a division that independence leader Morelos had organized to fight in southern Mexico.

Guerrero gained expertise in military strategy in the Battle of Zitlala. At the Battle of Tixtla, on 26 May 1811, Morelos asked Guerrero for his advice on the military strategy to be used on the town of Tixtla because Guerrero was from Tixtla. After the battle, Guerrero was told by Morelos to speak to the indigenous people of Tixtla since Guerrero was able to speak Nahuatl, the native language in Tixtla, because he had grown up in Tixtla. Morelos told Guerrero to inform the natives of their freedom from the Spanish. Historian William Sprague argued Guerrero was largely supported by the Native Americans throughout the Revolution due to his ability to speak and interact with the natives. By November 1811, Vicente Guerrero, alongside José María Morelos, took control of the highlands of the Mesa Del Sur, further building Guerrero's experience as an insurgent.

Guerrero distinguished himself in the Battle of Izúcar, in February 1812, and had achieved the rank of lieutenant colonel when Oaxaca was claimed by rebels in November 1812. In a speech given to the indigenous people in Tlapa in 1815, Guerrero argued for citizenship to be extended to indigenous people to establish a larger free society for those originally not recognized by the Spanish. Initial victories by Morelos's forces faltered, and Morelos himself was captured and executed in December 1815.

Historian Mario S. Guerrero argued Guerrero's guerrilla tactics and successes were just as significant to winning the War of Independence as notable battles. After the death of Morelos, in March 1816, Vicente Guerrero pledged his allegiance to the itinerant insurgent government left by the Congress of Anáhuac, the Junta Subalterna Gubernativa Provisional, often called the Junta de Jaujilla after the lake fortress where it sat in 1816–18. With the Spanish in pursuit, Guerrero used guerilla tactics he learned in his early military experience with Morelos. Guerrero fought in skirmishes with the Spanish in Piaxtla and Xonacatlán. Near Xonacatlán, Guerrero ambushed royalist Captain Jose Vicente Robles's force of 150 troops, which led to a victory and a smaller force in pursuit of Guerrero.

In March 1816, According to the Historian William Sprague, Vicente Guerrero, after the death of Morelos and Juan Nepomuceno Rosains had quit the revolution taking a Spanish pardon, Guerrero had no commander; therefore, Guadalupe Victoria and Isidoro Montes de Oca gave him the position of "Commander in Chief" of the rebel troops. In 1816, the royal government under Viceroy Apodaca sought to end the insurgency, offering amnesty. Guerrero's father carried an appeal for his son to surrender, but Guerrero refused. He remained the only major rebel leader still at large and kept the rebellion going through an extensive campaign of guerrilla warfare. He won victories at Ajuchitán, Santa Fe, Tetela del Río, Huetamo, Tlalchapa, and Cuautlotitlán, regions of southern Mexico that were very familiar to him. In late 1820, as the remnant of the Junta de Jaujilla broke up, it deposited its remaining authority in Guerrero and left him commander-in-chief of the insurgent forces still in arms.

On 16 November 1820, after being appointed commander of the royal forces in southern Mexico, Agustín de Iturbide was sent against Guerrero's forces. Guerrero was victorious against Iturbide, who realized that there was a military stalemate. Guerrero appealed to Iturbide to abandon his royalist loyalty and to join the fight for independence. Events in Spain had changed in 1820, with Spanish liberals ousting Ferdinand VII and imposing the liberal constitution of 1812 that the king had repudiated. Conservatives in Mexico, including the Catholic hierarchy, began to conclude that continued allegiance to Spain would undermine their position and opted for independence to maintain their control. Guerrero's appeal to join the forces for independence was successful. Guerrero and Iturbide allied under the Plan de Iguala and their forces merged as the Army of the Three Guarantees.

The Plan of Iguala proclaimed independence, called for a constitutional monarchy and the continued place of the Roman Catholic Church, and abolished the formal casta system of racial classification. While Iturbide, in writing the Plan of Iguala, did not include mulattos and blacks in receiving rights, Guerrero advocated for all people in Mexico to receive equal protections under the law without regards to race and refused to agree to any alternative. Clause 12 was incorporated into the plan: "All inhabitants... without distinction of their European, African or Indian origins are citizens... with full freedom to pursue their livelihoods according to their merits and virtues." The Army of the Three Guarantees marched triumphantly into Mexico City on 27 September 1821.

Iturbide was proclaimed Emperor of Mexico by Congress. In January 1823, Guerrero, along with Nicolás Bravo, rebelled against Iturbide, returning to southern Mexico to raise rebellion, according to some assessments because their careers had been blocked by the emperor. Their stated objectives were to restore the Constituent Congress. Guerrero and Bravo were defeated by Iturbide's forces at Almolongo, now in the state of Guerrero, less than a month later. When Iturbide's imperial government collapsed in 1823, Guerrero was named one of Constituent Congress's ruling triumvirate.

== 1828 presidential election ==
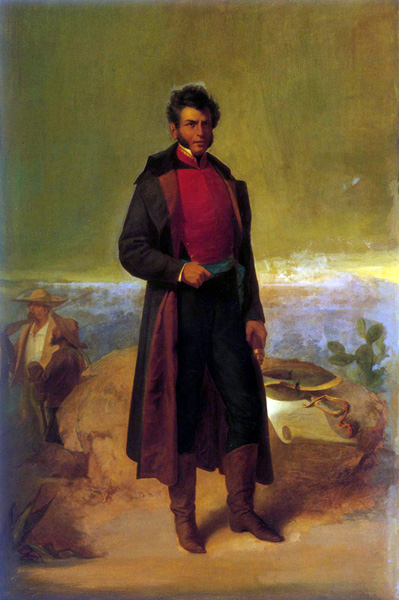
Oil painting of Vicente Guerrero, by Ramón Sagredo (1865).

Guerrero was a liberal by conviction, and active in the York Rite Masons, established in Mexico after independence by Joel Roberts Poinsett, the U.S. diplomatic representative to the newly independent Mexico. The Scottish Rite Masons had been established before independence. Following independence the Yorkinos appealed to a broad range of Mexico's populace, as opposed to the Scottish Rite Masons, who were a bulwark of conservatism, and in the absence of established political parties, rival groups of Masons functioned as political organizations. Guerrero had a large following among urban Yorkinos, who were mobilized during the 1828 election campaign and afterwards, in the ouster of the president-elect, Manuel Gómez Pedraza.

In 1828, the four-year term of the first president of the republic, Guadalupe Victoria, came to an end. Unlike the first presidential election and the president serving his full term, the election of 1828 was highly partisan. Guerrero's supporters included federalist liberals, members of the radical wing of the York Rite Freemasons. During Guerrero's campaign he advocated for political opportunities for all regardless of their race and wealth through universal suffrage in Mexico. General Manuel Gómez Pedraza won the September 1828 election to succeed Guadalupe Victoria, with Guerrero coming in second and Anastasio Bustamante, third through indirect election of Mexico's state legislatures. Gómez Pedraza was the candidate of the "Impartials", composed of Yorkinos concerned about the radicalism of Guerrero and Scottish Rite Masons (Escocés), who sought a new political party. Among those who were Impartials were distinguished federalist Yorkinos Valentín Gómez Farías and Miguel Ramos Arizpe. The U.S. diplomatic representative in Mexico, Joel Roberts Poinsett, was enthusiastic about Guerrero's candidacy, writing

"....A man who is held up as ostensible head of the party, and who will be their candidate for the next presidency, is General Guerrero, one of the most distinguished chiefs of the revolution. Guerrero is uneducated, but possesses excellent natural talents, combined with great decision of character and undaunted courage. His violent temper renders him difficult to control, and therefore I consider Zavala's presence here indispensably necessary, as he possesses great influence over the general."

— Joel R. Poinsett, US minister for Mexico (i.e. Ambassador), about the character of Vicente Guerrero

Guerrero himself did not leave an abundant written record, but some of his speeches survive.

"A free state protects the arts, industry, science and trade; and the only prizes virtue and merit: if we want to acquire the latter, let's do it cultivating the fields, the sciences, and all that can facilitate the sustenance and entertainment of men: let's do this in such a way that we will not be a burden for the nation, just the opposite, in a way that we will satisfy her needs, helping her to support her charge and giving relief to the distraught of humanity: with this we will also achieve abundant wealth for the nation, making her prosper in all aspects."

— Vicente Ramón Guerrero Saldaña, Speech to his compatriots

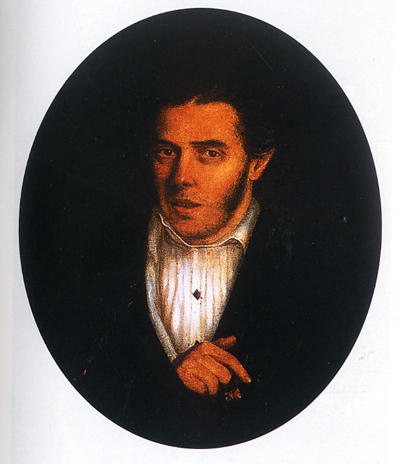
Portrait of Vicente Guerrero in civilian clothes, 19th century

Two weeks after the September election, Antonio López de Santa Anna rose in rebellion in support of Guerrero. As governor of the strategic state of Veracruz and former general in the war of independence, Santa Anna was a powerful figure in the early republic, but he was unable to persuade the state legislature to support Guerrero in the indirect elections. Santa Anna resigned the governorship and led 800 troops loyal to him in capturing the fortress of Perote, near Xalapa. He issued a political plan there calling for the nullification of Gómez Pedraza's election and the declaration of Guerrero as president.

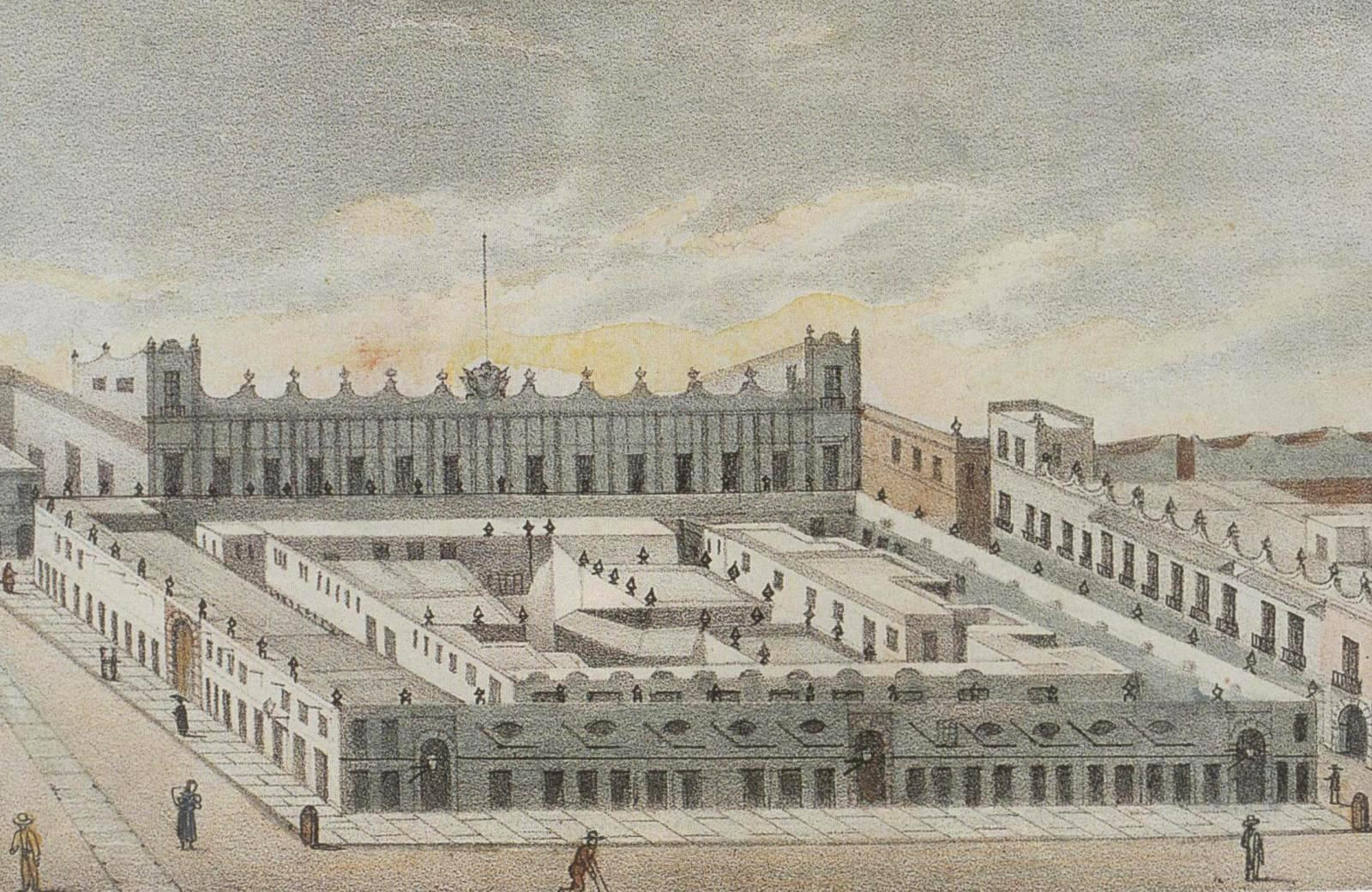
El Parián market in the zócalo, lithograph, early 19th century.

In November 1828 in Mexico City, Guerrero supporters took control of the Accordada, a former prison transformed into an armory, and days of fighting occurred in the capital. President-elect Gómez Pedraza had not yet taken office and at this juncture he resigned and soon went into exile in England. With the resignation of the president-elect and the ineffective rule of the sitting president, civil order dissolved. On 4 December 1828, a riot broke out in the Zócalo and the Parián market, where luxury goods were sold, was looted. Order was restored within a day, but elites in the capital were alarmed at the violence of the popular classes and the huge property losses. With the resignation of Gómez Pedraza, and Guerreros's cause backed by Santa Anna's forces and the powerful liberal politician Lorenzo de Zavala, Guerrero became president. Guerrero took office as president, with Bustamante, a conservative, becoming vice president. One scholar sums up Guerrero's situation, "Guerrero owed the presidency to a mutiny and a failure of will on the part of [President] Guadalupe Victoria...Guerrero was to rule as president with only a thin layer of support."

== Presidency ==

Government of Vicente Guerrero
| Office | Name | Term |
| Foreign Affairs | José María Bocanegra | 1 Apr. 1829–2 Nov. 1829 |
| Agustín Viesca | 3 Nov. 1829–18 Dec. 1829 |
| Justice | Joaquín de Iturbide | 1 Apr. 1829–7 Apr. 1829 |
| José Manuel de Herrera | 8 Apr. 1829–18 Dec. 1829 |
| Finance | Bernardo González Angulo | 1 Apr. 1829–13 Apr. 1829 |
| Francisco Moctezuma | 14 Apr. 1829–17 Apr. 1829 |
| Lorenzo de Zavala | 18 Apr. 1829–2 Nov. 1829 |
| José María Bocanegra | 3 Nov. 1829–17 Dec. 1829 |
| War | Francisco Moctezuma | 1 Apr. 1829–18 Dec. 1829 |

A liberal folk hero of the independence insurgency, Guerrero became president on 1 April 1829, with conservative Anastasio Bustamante as his vice president. For some of Guerrero's supporters, a visibly mixed-race man from Mexico's periphery becoming president of Mexico was a step toward what one 1829 pamphleteer called "the reconquest of this land by its legitimate owners" and called Guerrero "that immortal hero, favorite son of Nezahualcoyotzin", the famous ruler of pre-Hispanic Texcoco. Some creole elites (American-born whites of Spanish heritage) were alarmed by Guerrero as president, a group that liberal Lorenzo de Zavala disparagingly called "the new Mexican aristocracy".

Guerrero set about creating a cabinet of liberals, but his government already encountered serious problems, including its very legitimacy, since president-elect Gómez Pedraza had resigned under pressure. Some traditional federalists leaders, who might have supported Guerrero, did not do so because of the electoral irregularities. The national treasury was empty and future revenues were already liened. Spain continued to deny Mexico's independence and threatened reconquest.

A key achievement of his presidency was the abolition of slavery in most of Mexico. The slave trade had already been banned by the Spanish authorities in 1818, a ban that had been reconfirmed by the nascent Mexican government in 1824. A few Mexican states had also already abolished the practice of slavery, but it was not until 16 September 1829 that abolition across almost all of the nation was proclaimed by the Guerrero administration. Slavery at this point barely existed throughout Mexico, and only the state of Coahuila y Tejas was significantly affected, due to the immigration of slave owners from the United States. In response to pressure from Texan settlers, Guerrero exempted Texas from the decree on 2 December 1829.

Guerrero called for public schools, land title reforms, industry and trade development, and other programs of a liberal nature. As president, Guerrero championed the causes of the racially oppressed and economically oppressed. Initially, the leader of the colonization of Texas, Stephen F. Austin, proved enthusiastic towards the Mexican government.

"This is the most liberal and munificent Government on earth to emigrants – after being here one year you will oppose a change even to Uncle Sam"

— Stephen Fuller Austin, 1829, letter to his sister describing Guerrero's Government of Mexico (and Texas)

During Guerrero's presidency, the Spanish tried to reconquer Mexico but were defeated at the Battle of Tampico.

== Fall and execution ==
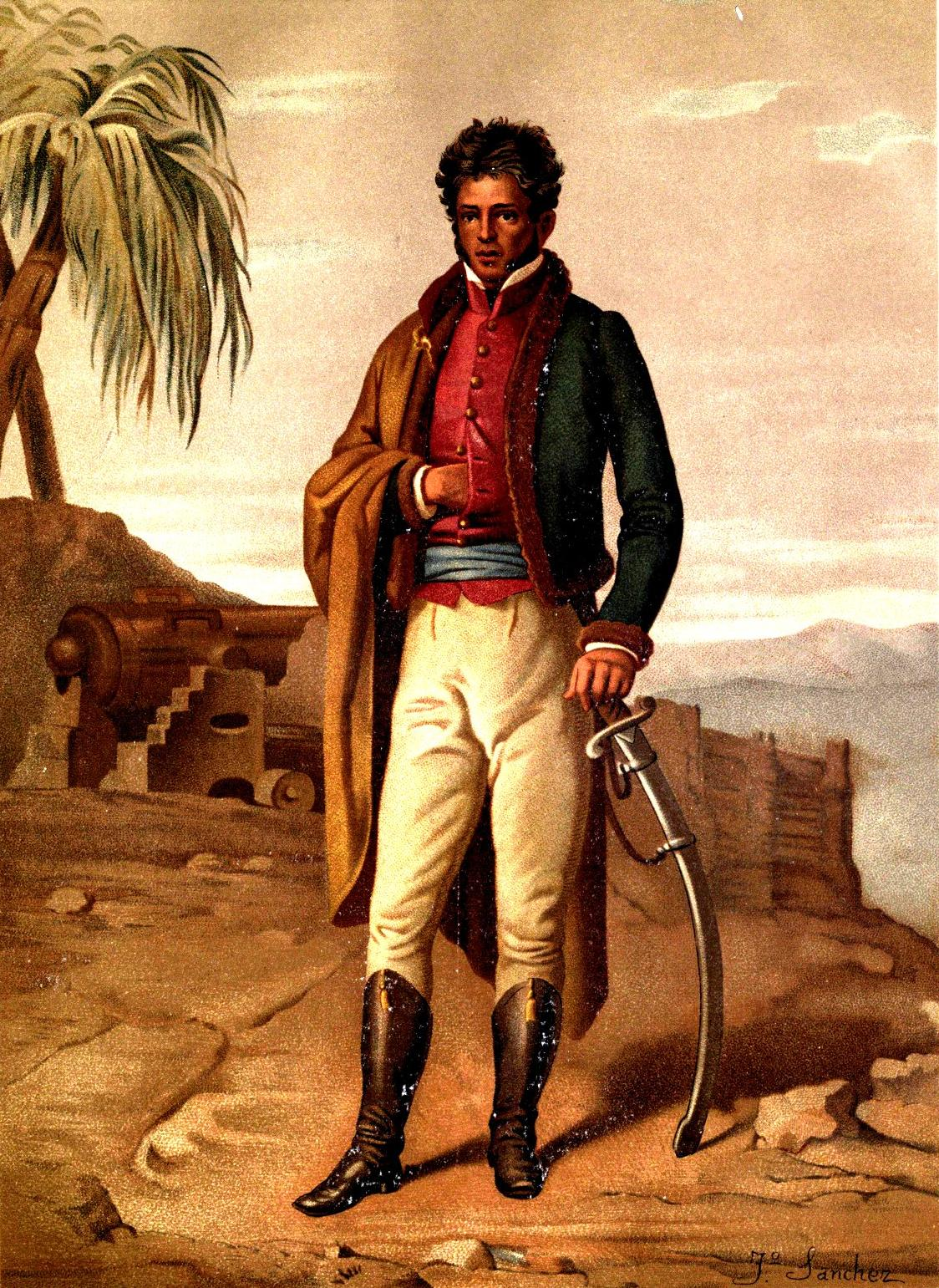
Image extracted from the book of Vicente Riva Palacio, Julio Zárate (1880).

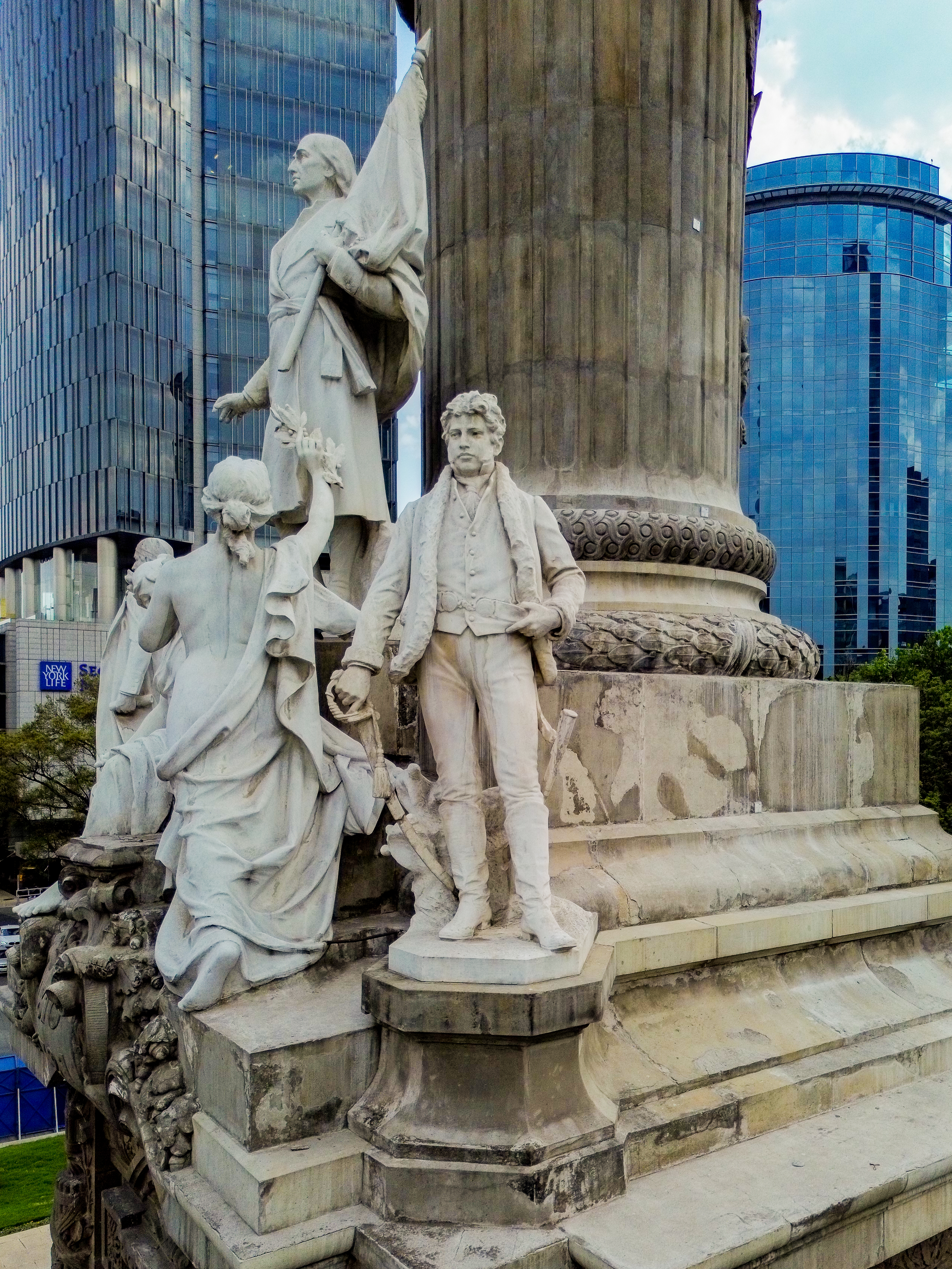
Vicente Guerrero depicted at the Angel of Independence by Enrique Alciati, Mexico City.

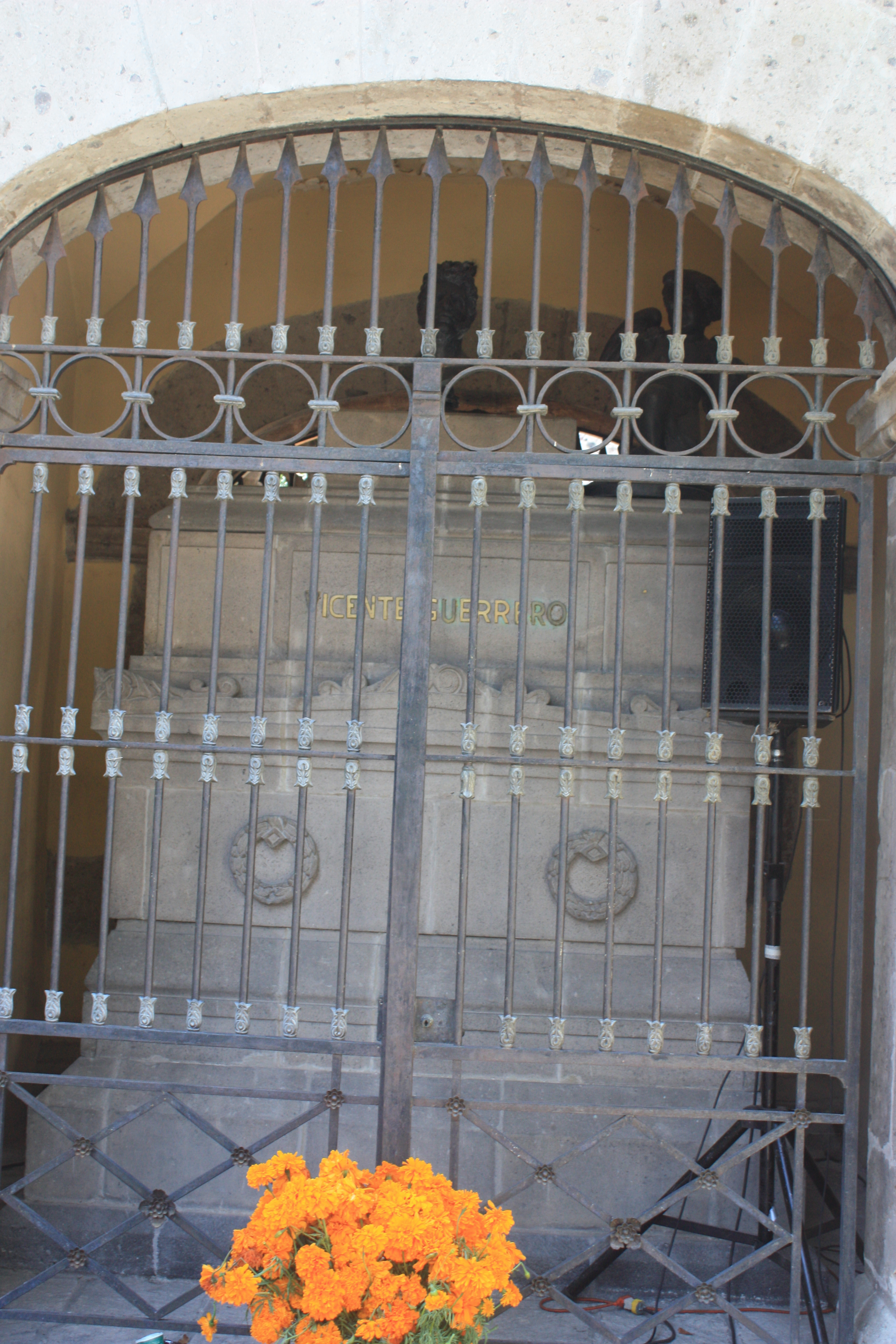
Empty tomb of Vicente Guerrero in the San Fernando Pantheon Museum in Mexico City, where his daughter and son-in-law are also located.

Guerrero was deposed in a rebellion under Vice President Anastasio Bustamante that began on 4 December 1829. Guerrero left the capital to fight in the south, but was deposed by the Mexico City garrison in his absence on 17 December 1829. Guerrero had returned to the region of southern Mexico where he had fought during the war of independence.

Open warfare between Guerrero and his opponent in the region Nicolás Bravo was fierce. Bravo and Guerrero had been comrades in the insurgency during the War of Independence. Bravo controlled the highlands of the region, including the town of Guerrero's birth, Tixtla. Guerrero had strength in the hot coastal regions of the Costa Grande and Tierra Caliente, with mixed race populations that had been mobilized during the insurgency for independence. Bravo's area had a mixed population, but politically was dominated by whites. The conflict in the south occurred for all of 1830, as conservatives consolidated power in Mexico City.

The war in the south might have continued even longer, but ended in what one historian has called "the most shocking single event in the history of the first republic: the capture of Guerrero in Acapulco through an act of betrayal and his execution a month later." Guerrero controlled Mexico's principal Pacific coast port of Acapulco. An Italian merchant ship captain, Francisco Picaluga, approached the conservative government in Mexico City with a proposal to lure Guerrero onto his ship and take him prisoner for the price of 50,000 pesos, a fortune at the time. Picaluga invited Guerrero on board for a meal on 14 January 1831. Guerrero and a few aides were taken captive and Picaluga sailed to the port of Huatulco, where Guerrero was turned over to federal troops. Guerrero was taken to the city of Oaxaca and summarily tried by a court-martial.

His capture was welcomed by conservatives and some state legislatures, but the legislatures of Zacatecas and Jalisco tried to prevent Guerrero's execution. The government's 50,000 peso payment to Picaluga was exposed in the liberal press. Despite pleas for his life, Guerrero was executed by firing squad in Cuilapam on 14 February 1831. His death did mark the dissolution of the rebellion in southern Mexico, but those politicians involved in his execution paid a lasting price to their reputations.

Many Mexicans saw Guerrero as the "martyr of Cuilapam" and his execution was deemed by the liberal newspaper El Federalista Mexicano "judicial murder". The two conservative cabinet members considered most culpable for Guerrero's execution, Lucas Alamán and Secretary of War José Antonio Facio, "spent the rest of their lives defending themselves from the charge that they were responsible for the ultimate betrayal in the history of the first republic, that is, that they had arranged not just for the service of Picaluga's ship but specifically for his capture of Guerrero."

Historian Jan Bazant speculates as to why Guerrero was executed rather than sent into exile, as Iturbide had been, as well as Antonio López de Santa Anna, and long-time dictator of late-nineteenth century Mexico, Porfirio Díaz. "The clue is provided by Zavala who, writing several years later, noted that Guerrero was of mixed blood and that the opposition to his presidency came from the great landowners, generals, clerics and Spaniards resident in Mexico...Guerrero's execution was perhaps a warning to men considered as socially and ethnically inferior not to dare to dream of becoming president."

Honors were conferred on surviving members of Guerrero's family, and a pension was paid to his widow. In 1842, Vicente Guerrero's remains were exhumed and returned to Mexico City for reinterment. He is known for his political discourse promoting equal civil rights for all Mexican citizens. He has been described as the "greatest man of color" to ever live.

== Legacy ==
Guerrero is a Mexican national hero. The state of Guerrero is named in his honour. Several towns in Mexico are named in honor of this famous general, including Vicente Guerrero in Durango, Vicente Guerrero in Baja California and the Colonia Guerrero in Mexico City.

According to historian Theodore G. Vincent, In 1831 after Vicente Guerrero's death, Vicente Guerrero's wife, Guadalupe, daughter, Dolores, and former supporters of Guerrero formed a political thought group. Vincent titled these supporters as, "Guerreroistas." As a Guerreroistas, historian Vincent argues that they believed in similar ideals of equal rights for all races.

Vicente Guerrero by his Guerreroistas is often mentioned as it pertains to race and lineage using his legacy of the revolution to support their actions. According to Theodore G. Vincent, Guerrero's grandson, Vicente Riva Palacio, influenced by his family of Guerreroistas received the opportunity, from Guerrero's "puro" political party in 1861, to investigate the Spanish Inquisition in Mexico and published over 38,000 pieces of evidence of Spanish abuse and Mexican opposition to it. Vicente Riva Palacio, according to Vincent, attributed his beliefs and political actions to his mother Dolores and connects Riva Palacio directly to Guerrero beliefs and Guerreroistas. According to historian Theodore Vincent, in 1986, Senator Antonio Riva Palacio referenced his lineage being connected to Vicente Guerrero and his motivation to continue Vicente Guerrero's legacy of equality and equity for all Mexicans no matter their racial background.

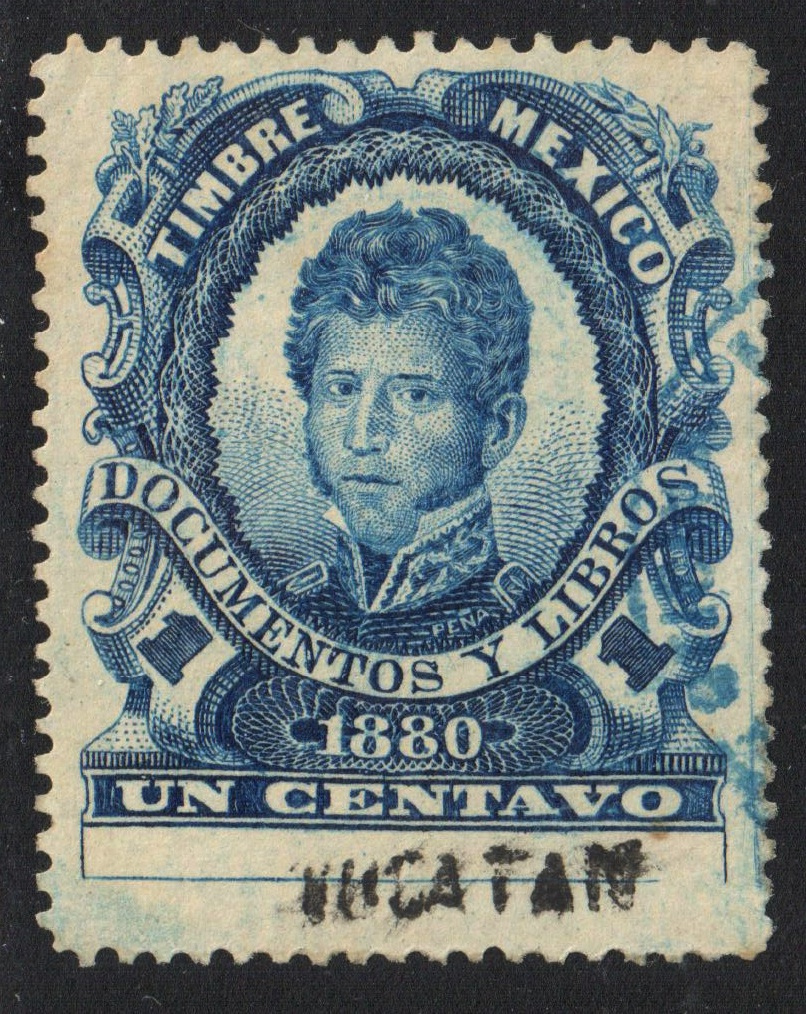
Stamp with portrait of Vicente Guerrero

According to the historian and politician Lorenzo de Zavala, who published in his book, Ensayo Histórico de las Revoluciones de México, Desde 1808 hasta 1830, Vicente Guerrero had an encounter with his father in 1817. According to Zavala, Vicente Guerrero was approached by his father to lay down his arms and take a Spanish pardon and Vicente replied, "Companions, you see this respectable old man, he is my father. He comes to offer me money and position in the name of the Spaniards. I have always had respect for my father, but my country comes first." These words contribute to mythology surrounding Guerrero that historian Theodore Vincent argues makes up Mexican culture. According to the Center of Documentation and Analysis, in 2007, Guerrero's words, "La Patria es Primero," were placed in gold writing inside the Chamber of Deputies in honor of Guerrero to represent his legacy and its effect on Mexican government and culture.

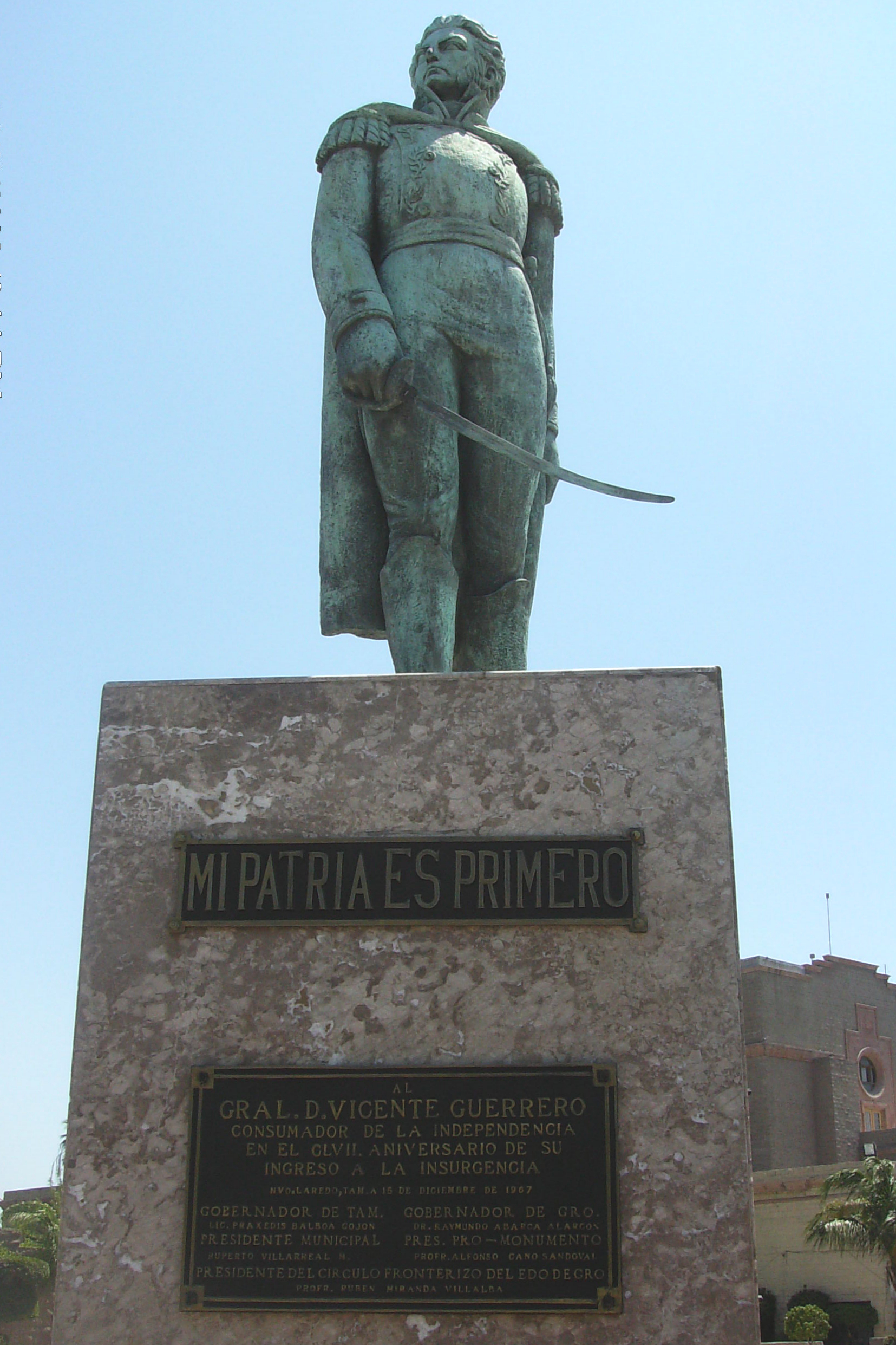
Statue in honor of Vicente Guerrero in Nuevo Laredo.

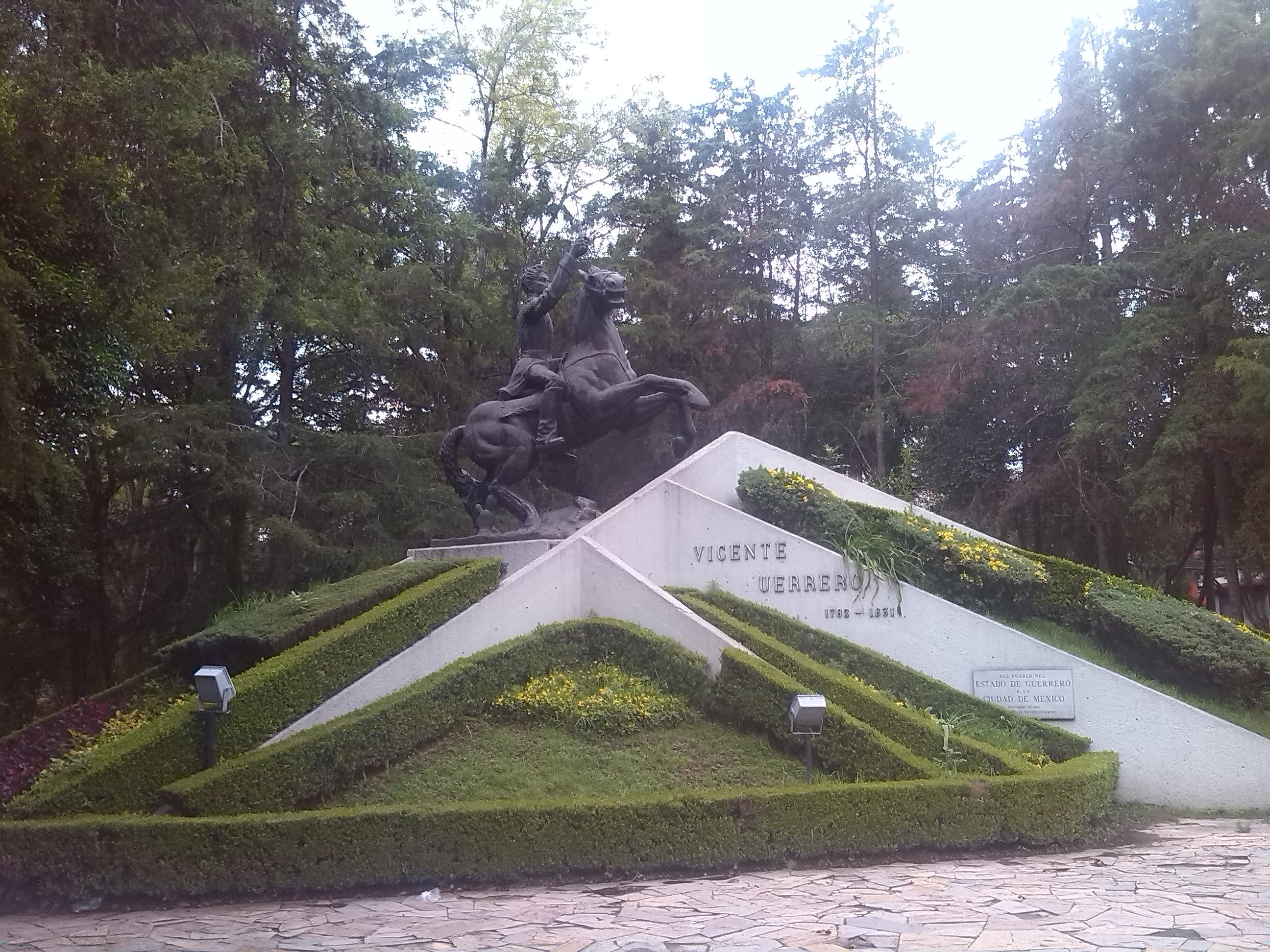
Monument to Vicente Guerrero in Mexico City (Parque Hundido).

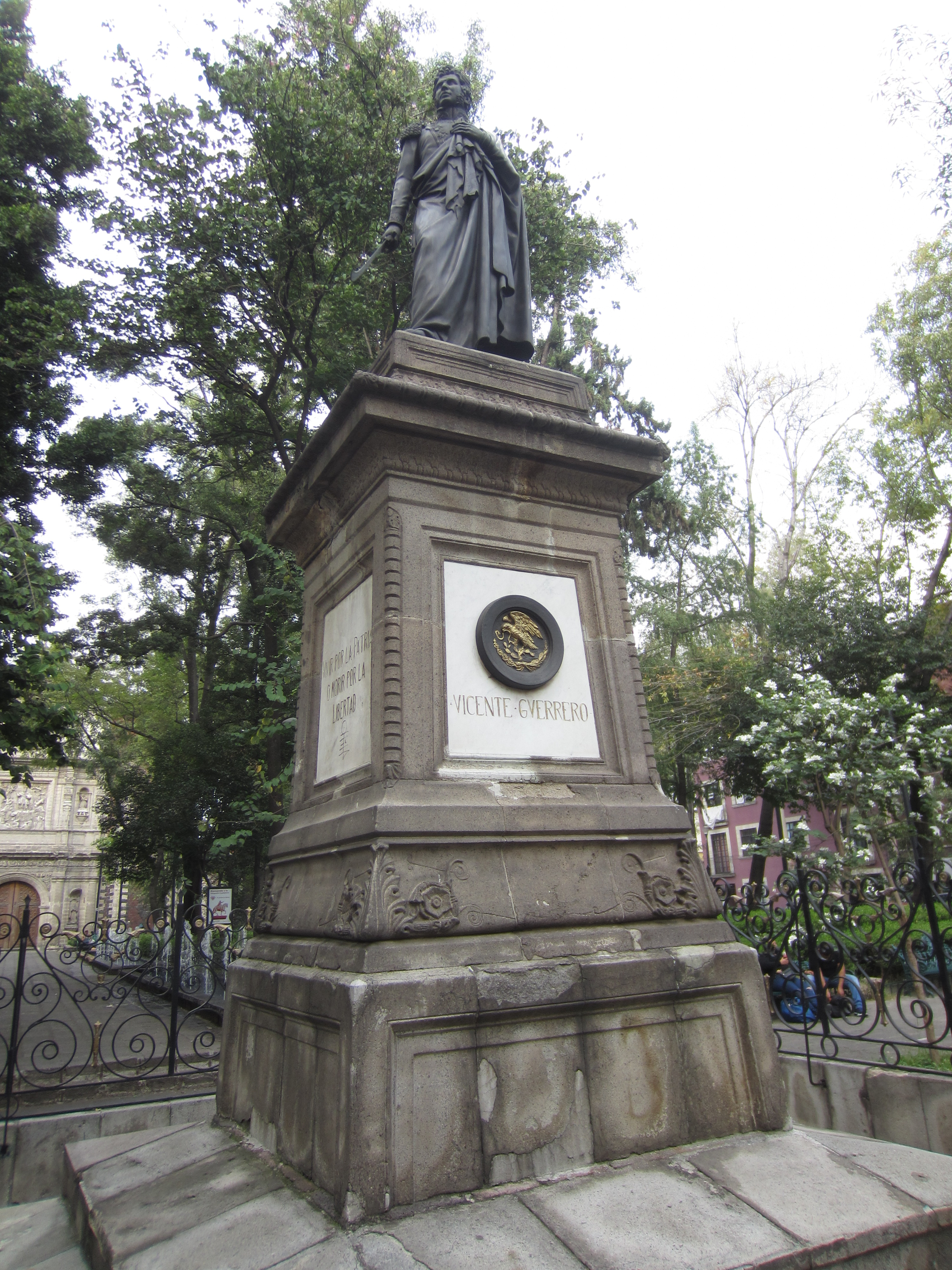
Monument in the Colonia Guerrero.

== See also ==
- Filipino immigration to Mexico
- Gaspar Yanga
- History of Mexico
- José María Larios
- Liberalism in Mexico
- List of presidents of Mexico
- List of wars involving Mexico
- Mexican War of Independence
- Embrace of Acatempan
- First Mexican Empire

Political offices
| Preceded by Guadalupe Victoria | President of Mexico; 1 April – 17 December 1829 | Succeeded by José María Bocanegra |
