= Sagredo =

Sagredo is a surname. It may refer to:

- Boris Sagredo (born 1989), Chilean footballer
- Caterina Sagredo Barbarigo (1715–1772), Italian noble and salon holder
- Gerard Sagredo (980–1046), Italian Benedictine monk
- Giovanni Francesco Sagredo (1571–1620), Italian mathematician; friend of Galileo Galilei
- Nicolò Sagredo (1606–1676), Italian Doge (Venice)
- Ramón Sagredo (1834–1873), Mexican painter and photographer
