= National Constituent Assembly =

National Constituent Assembly may refer to:

- Constituent assembly, a body of representatives assembled to draft or adopt a constitution

== Specific assemblies ==
(alphabetical by country or state)

=== A – C ===
- 1972 Bahraini Constituent Assembly election
- Constituent Assembly of Bangladesh (1971–1973)
- Bolivian Constituent Assembly (various, from 1825 to 1967)
- Bolivian Constituent Assembly of 2006–07
- Brazilian Constituent Assembly (1823)
- Brazilian Constituent Assembly (1933–1934)
- Brazilian Constituent Assembly (1988)
- Cambodia Constituent Assembly (1993)
- Constituent Assembly of Colombia (1991)
- Constituent Assembly of Costa Rica (1949)

=== D – I ===
- Ecuadorian Constituent Assembly (2007–2008)
- National Assembly (Eritrea) (1997)
- 1919 Estonian Constituent Assembly election
- National Constituent Assembly (France) (1789–1791)
- Constituent Assembly of Georgia (1919–1921)
- Constituent Assembly of India (1946–1950)
- Constituent Assembly of Italy (1946–1948)

=== J – P ===
- Constituent Assembly of Jammu and Kashmir (1951–1957)
- Constituent Assembly of Lithuania (1920–1922)
- Constituent Assembly of Luxembourg (1848)
- Constituent Assembly of Pakistan (1947)
- Constituent Assembly (Philippines), a provision of the 1987 Constitution
- National Constituent Assembly (Portugal) (1911)
- Constituent Assembly of Portugal (1975–1976)

=== R – Z ===
- National Constituent Assembly (Republic of China) (1946)
- Russian Constituent Assembly (1917–1918)
- Constituent Assembly of Tunisia (2011–2014)
- Ukrainian Constituent Assembly (1917–1918)
- 1999 Constituent National Assembly, Venezuela
- 2017 Constituent National Assembly, Venezuela
