= List of Irish constitutional conventions =

Several constitutional conventions have considered or proposed constitutions for the island of Ireland or for one of its two jurisdictions, Northern Ireland and the Republic of Ireland.

Body	Members	Authority	When met	Territory	Result
Irish Convention	Appointed, nominated	British government	1917–18	Whole island	Failed to agree on a replacement for the Government of Ireland Act 1914.
First Dáil	Elected	Self-appointed	1919–1921	Whole island	Produced a brief Dáil Constitution and aspirational Democratic Programme for its self-proclaimed Irish Republic
3rd Dáil sitting as a constituent assembly	Elected	Anglo-Irish Treaty	1922 (Note: After enacting the constitution, the 3rd Dáil continued as a provisional parliament and then as the first Free State Dáil until the 1923 election.)	Irish Free State (Note: The state's territory was technically the whole island till the Parliament of Northern Ireland formally opted out. The Provisional Parliament's members represented only the territory of Southern Ireland.)	Enacted the Constitution of the Irish Free State, which had been drafted by a committee appointed by the Provisional Government, and which was then re-enacted at Westminster via the Irish Free State Constitution Act 1922
8th Dáil	Elected	Irish Free State (Note: See also legality of the enactment of the Constitution of Ireland)	1937 (Note: The 8th Dáil was elected in 1933, but the Constitution was not considered by it till March 1937)	State of Ireland (Note: Article 2 of the new constitution claimed the whole island as the national territory (though not the state jurisdiction) until a 1999 amendment)	Passed the Constitution of Ireland, which had been drafted by a committee appointed by the Taoiseach, and which was then adopted by plebiscite
Northern Ireland Constitutional Convention	Elected	British government	1975–76	Northern Ireland	An elected consultative body envisaged as a prelude to devolution, which was dissolved after nationalist and unionist members failed to reach any agreement.
New Ireland Forum	Appointed (Chair), nominated	Irish government	1983–84	Whole island	Established by the Dublin government to consider possible constitutional arrangements in view of the Troubles in Northern Ireland.
Northern Ireland Forum	Elected	British government	1996–98	Northern Ireland	Played a subsidiary role in the Northern Ireland peace process, as Sinn Féin boycotted the Forum but not the talks that led to the Good Friday Agreement
Constitutional Convention	Appointed (Chair), nominated (33), randomly selected (66)	Irish government	2012–14	State of Ireland	To consider specified proposed amendments to the existing Constitution.

== See also ==
- Irish question
- Partition of Ireland
- The Troubles and Northern Ireland peace process
