= Provisional Political Bylaws of the Mexican Empire =

Provisional Political Regulation of the Mexican Empire
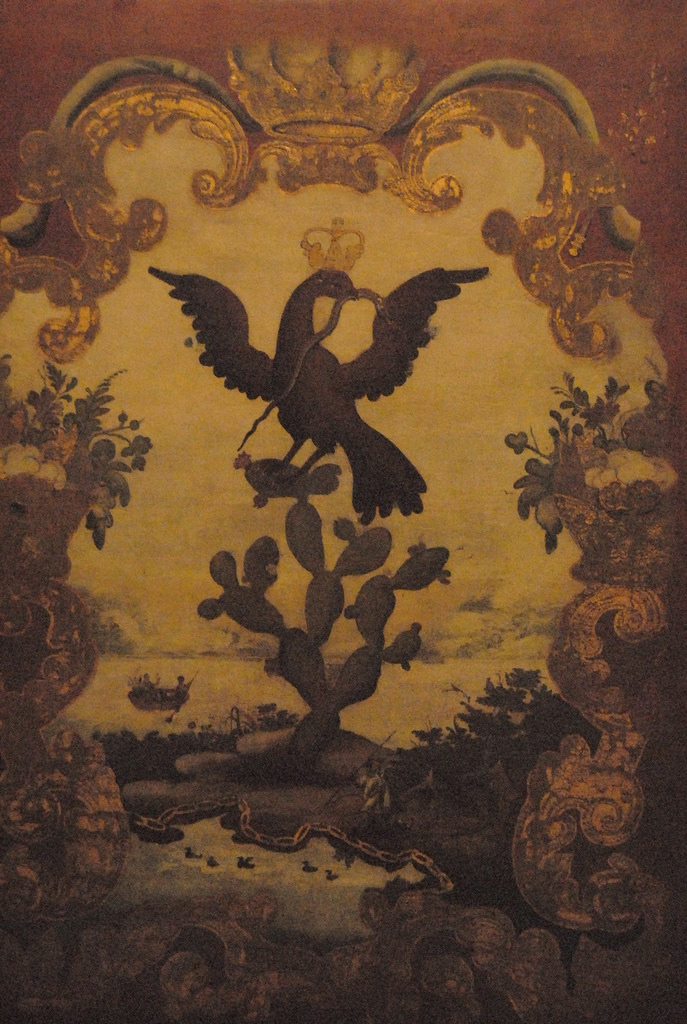
- Magna Charta of the Mexican Empire
- Created: December 18, 1822
- Ratified: January 10, 1823
- Author: National Institutional Junta
- Signatories: Secretaries: Toribio González (Deputy for Guadalajara), Antonio José Valdés (Supply deputy) y Ramón Martínez de los Ríos (Deputy for Potosí)
- Purpose: Repeal the Constitution of Cádiz of 1812

The Provisional Political Regulation of the Mexican Empire were political regulations that governed the early days of the nation of Mexican Empire. It granted effect to the laws, orders and regulations promulgated until February 24, 1821, with the Plan of Iguala; as well as the laws, orders and decrees issued in consequence of the Independence of Mexico with the triumphant entry of the Army of the Three Guarantees in Mexico City.

The Regulation consisted of a preamble and an article divided into eight sections, which in turn were divided into chapters and further into articles, with the exception of article 25, which hosted the 15 bases contained in the imperial decree of November 2, 1822.

== Territorial organization ==
At the time of the promulgation of the Provisional Regulation in 1822, the nation of New Spain was composed of 12 municipalities (Arizpe, San Luis Potosi, Durango, Zacatecas, Guadalajara, Guanajuato, Veracruz, Valladolid, Mexico, Puebla, Antequera of Oaxaca and Mérida of Yucatán) and 4 governments (Nueva California, Vieja California, Nuevo México and Tlaxcala), so after the proclamation of the Mexican Empire, the Captaincy General of Guatemala was annexed to the national geography, leaving finally 26 provinces.

Nueva California; Vieja California; Mexico; Nuevo México; Texas; Nueva Vizcaya; Coahuila; New Kingdom of León; New Santander; Nueva Navarra; Zacatecas; Potosí; Guanajuato	Tlaxcala; Querétaro; Puebla; Guadalajara; Oaxaca; Yucatán; Valladolid; Veracruz; Guatemala; San Salvador; Honduras; Nicaragua; Costa Rica
