= Battle of Zitlala =

1812 battle of the Mexican War of Independence

- Part of the Mexican War of Independence
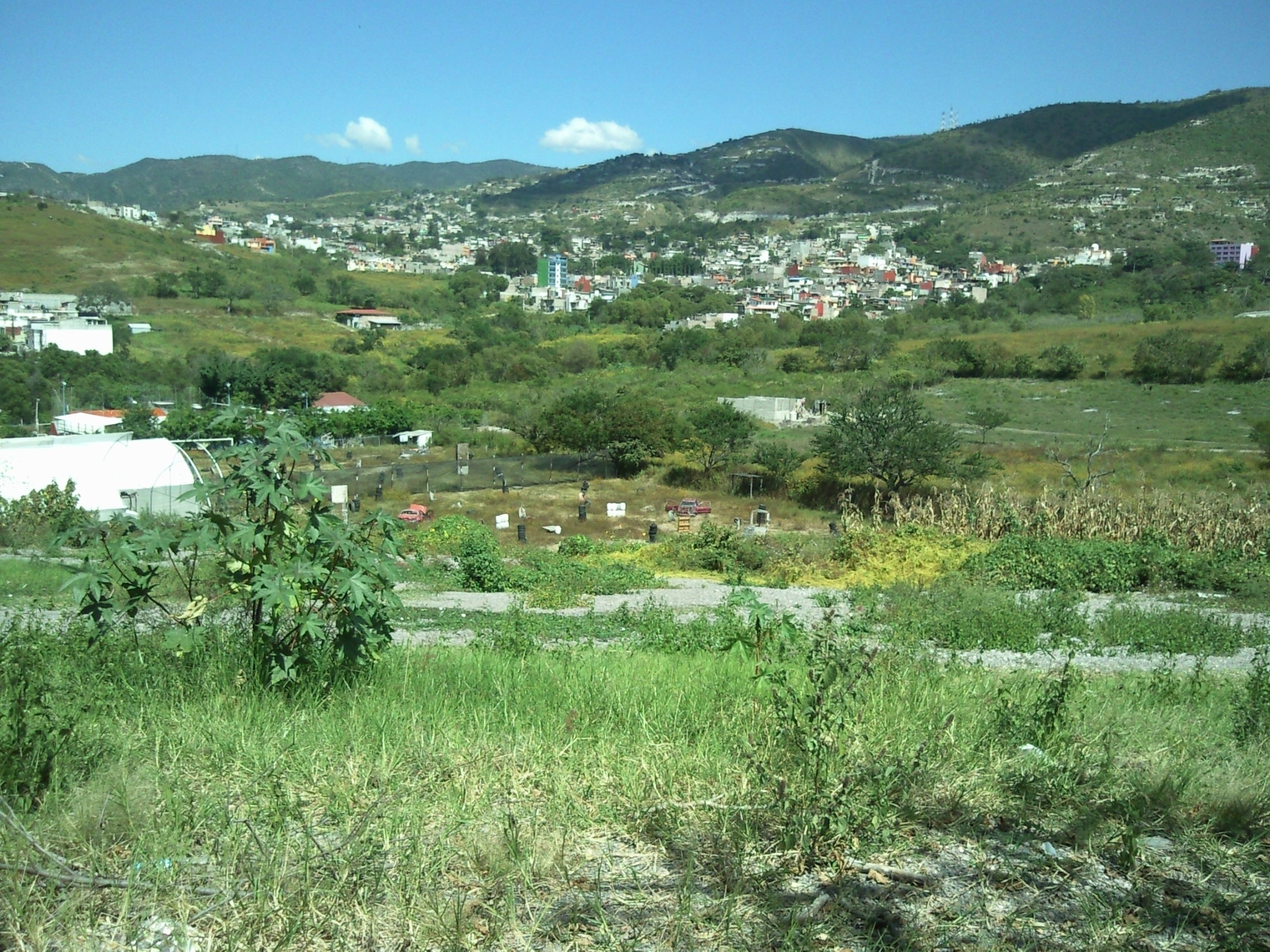
- The town of Chilpancingo, from where the Mexican insurgent soldiers that participated in the action marched.
Date	4 July 1812
Location	Zitlala, Guerrero, Mexico
Result	Mexican rebel victory

Belligerents
Mexican Rebels	Spanish Empire

Commanders and leaders
José María Morelos; Hermenegildo Galeana	José María Añorve de Salas

Strength
Unknown	50

The Battle of Zitlala took place during the War of Mexican Independence on 4 July 1812 in the outskirts of Zitlala, Guerrero. The battle was fought between the royalist forces loyal to the Spanish crown, and the Mexican rebels fighting for independence from the Spanish Empire. The battle resulted in a victory for the Mexican rebels.

== Context ==
When José María Morelos was advancing on the capital of Oaxaca, he routed a Spanish loyalist force at Zitlala, Guerrero. After his escape from the 72-day siege at Cuautla, Morelos joined his army together with 800 men under the command of Hermenegildo Galeana and Miguel Bravo at Chiautla. He then moved to march against the loyalist commander General José María Añorve de Salas at Chilapa de Álvarez followed by General Cerro at Tixtla de Guerrero. The regional Mexican commander, Juan Francisco París, did not move to further defend these towns as his army was occupied defending Ayutla de los Libres.

General Cerro, knowing that es:Máximo BravoMáximo Bravo was marching with soldiers from Chilpancingo de los Bravo, decided to attack him at Tixtla de Guerrero and informed Añorve de Salas of his plans to that end. As Bravo marched towards Chilpancingo, he received news that Morelos was in the area around the Tlacesoutitlan River and that royalist forces under the command of Julián Ayala Larrazábal were marching towards Petaquillas.

== The battle ==
After being informed of these developments, Añorve de Salas ordered Cerro to join his forces, however, a party of 50 men who apparently did not receive the orders or who had not yet begun their maneuvers to join the main Spanish force, were in the town of Zitlala when an insurgent force under the command of Hermenegildo Galeana arrived and gave battle. The insurgents advanced on the town in two sections and eventually were successful in obliging the loyalist forces, who were on horseback, to retreat. The retreating Spanish forces left behind weapons and prisoners which were then taken to Zacatula.

== See also ==
- Mexican War of Independence
