= Georgia Constitutional Convention of 1861 =

The Georgia Constitutional Convention of 1861 was held for the purpose of constructing a constitution to respond to the newly formed Confederate States of America. It prohibited the legislature from making any law that would free slaves (Article II, Section VII).

The convention enshrined the concept that the state should be sovereign in many matters. It met sporadically from January 16 to March 23, 1861, in Milledgeville. It voted to secede from the Union. It created the first new constitution since 1798. Secession helped precipitate the Civil War thus significantly altering the history of the state. Constitutional conventions in Georgia were held after the Civil War in 1865 and 1867–1868.
