= National Institutional Junta =

Year-long legislative assembly of the First Mexican Empire

National Institutional Junta Junta Nacional Instituyente
- First Mexican Empire

Type
- Type: Unicameral

History
- Founded: 2 November 1822
- Disbanded: 4 March 1823
- Preceded by: Constituent Congress
- Succeeded by: Constituent Congress (reinstallment)

Leadership
- President: Juan Francisco de Castañiza
- Seats: 48

Meeting place
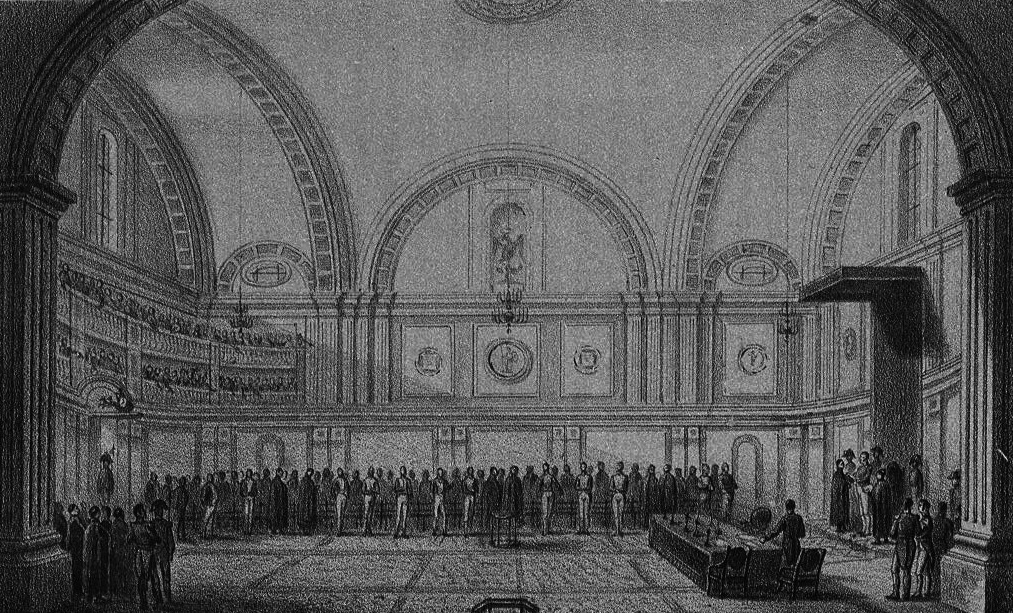
- San Pedro and San Pablo College, Mexico City

The National Institutional Junta (Spanish: Junta Nacional Instituyente) was a legislative assembly established on 2 November 1822 by order of Emperor Agustín de Iturbide with the purpose of replacing the congress which he had dissolved. Iturbide declared that until a new congress could be convened, popular representation would reside within this Junta.

Its first session was held on 2 November 1822 in the San Pedro and San Pablo College, where Juan Francisco de Castañiza y González, Marquis of Castañiza, was named president of the same. Then, this Junta was in charge of several matters of immediate need and prepared a project for convening a new congress. The Junta ceased its work at the beginning of March 1823, when Agustín de Iturbide reinstated the first congress again.

== List of deputies of the National Institutional Junta ==
Province	Deputies
Mexico	Joaquín Román; José de Sardaneta
Puebla	Luis Mendizábal; Francisco Puig
Durango	Juan Francisco de Castañiza; Francisco Velasco
Querétaro	Juan Nepomuceno Mier y Altamirano
Tlaxcala	Miguel Guridi y Alcocer
Valladolid	Francisco Argandar; Antonio Aguilar
Oaxaca	Antonio Morales de Ibáñez; Pedro Labayru
Guanajuato	Francisco Uraga; Antonio de Mier y Villagomez
Veracruz	José María Becerra; José Ignacio Esteva
Guadalajara	Toribio González; Mariano Mendiola
Potosí	Ramón Esteban Martínez de los Ríos; Pascual de Aranda
Zacatecas	Agustín de Iriarte; José María Bocanegra
Sonora y Sinaloa	Carlos Espinosa de los Monteros; Antonio Iriarte
Yucatán	Manuel Lorenzo de Zavala; Santiago Calderón Helguera, Count of Miraflores
Nuevo Mexico	Francisco Pérez Serrano
Nuevo Reyno de León	Juan Bautista Arizpe
Nuevo Santander	José Antonio Gutiérrez de Lara
Coahuila	Antonio Elozua
Texas	Refugio de la Garza
Antigua California	Manuel Ortíz
Nueva California	Ambrosio Martínez de Vea
Deputies for Chiapas, Guatemala, Nicaragua, Honduras, San Salvador, and Costa Rica	1. Pedro Celís; 2. Pedro Arroyabe; 3. Isidro Montúfar; 4. Luciano Figueroa; 5. Manuel Ignacio Gutiérrez; 6. Bonifacio Fernández; 7. Miguel Larreynaga; 8. Tomás Beltranena; 9. José Vicente Orantes; 10. Juan José Quiñones; 11. Manuel López de la Plata; 12. José Francisco Peralta; 13. Jacinto Rubí
Deputies Substitutes	1. Antonio José Valdés; 2. José María Covarrubias; 3. Manuel Flores; 4. Martín Inclán; 5. José María Abarca; 6. Mariano Aranda; 7. Simón Elías González; 8. Manuel Álvarez

== See also ==
- Provisional Political Bylaws of the Mexican Empire
