= First Mexican Empire =

Mexican government from 1821 to 1823

Mexican Empire Imperio Mexicano (Spanish) Imperium Mexicanum (Latin)
- 1821–1823
- Flag Imperial coat of arms
- Motto: Independencia, Unión, Religión "Independence, Union, Religion"
- The First Mexican Empire in 1822 including modern day Guatemala, El Salvador, Honduras, Nicaragua, Costa Rica, Texas, New Mexico, Utah, Nevada, Arizona, and California
- Capital: Mexico City
- Common languages: Spanish
- Religion: Catholicism (official)
- Government: Provisional government (1821–1822); Unitary constitutional monarchy (1822–1823)
- President of the Regency
  - 1821–1822: Agustín de Iturbide
- Emperor
  - 1822–1823: Agustín I
- Legislature: Provisional Government Junta (1821–1822); Constituent Congress (1822); National Institutional Junta (1822–1823)
- History
  - Plan of Iguala: 24 February 1821
  - Independence of Mexico: 27 September 1821
  - Abdication of Agustín I: 19 March 1823

Area
- 1821: 4,429,000 km^{2} (1,710,000 sq mi)

Population
  - 1821: 6,500,000
- Currency: Mexican real
Preceded by
New Spain
Succeeded by
Provisional Government of Mexico
United Provinces of Central America
British Honduras
Mosquito Coast

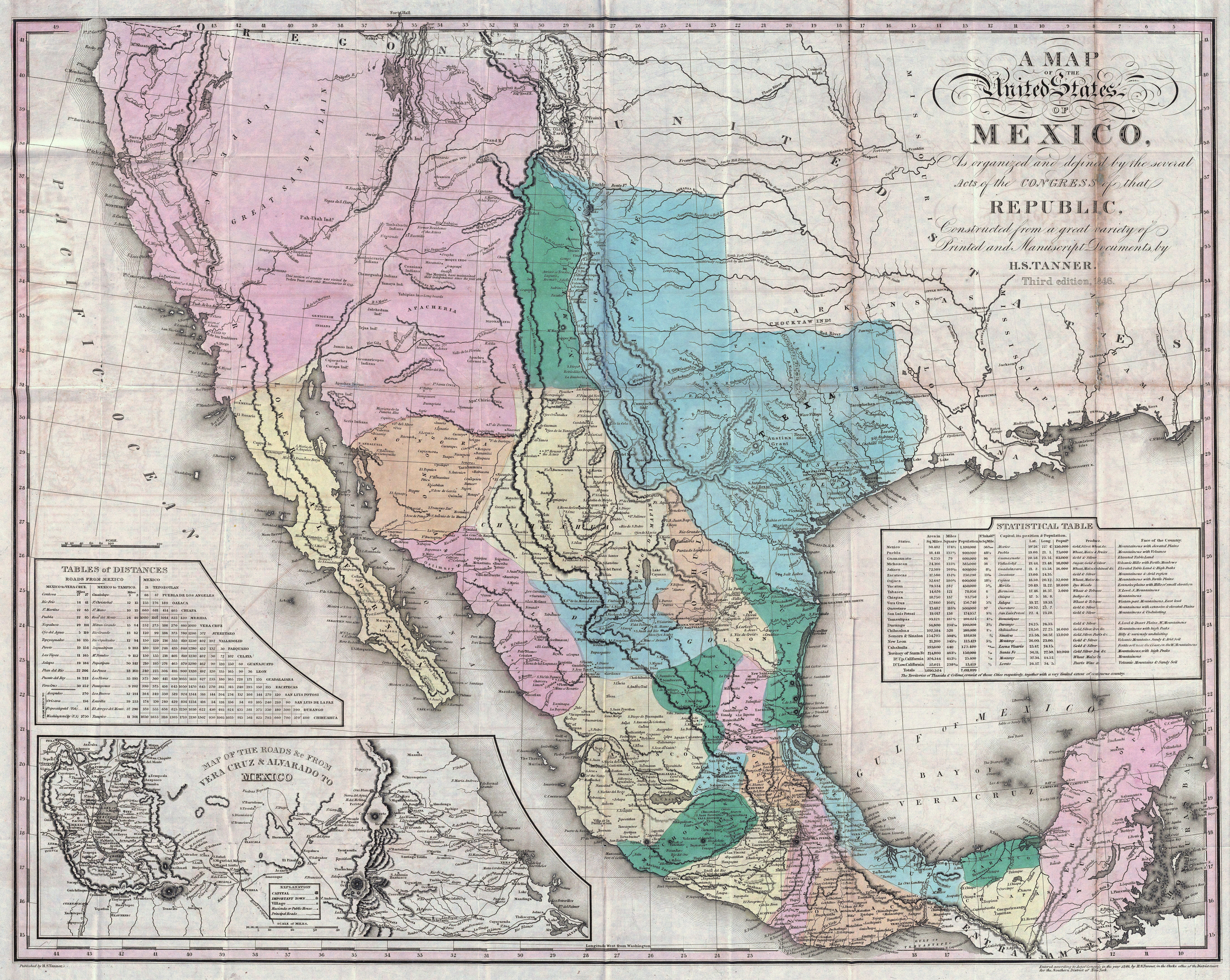
Map of Mexico from 1821 to 1848

The Mexican Empire (Spanish: Imperio Mexicano, pronounced [imˈpeɾjo mexiˈkano]) was a constitutional monarchy and the first independent government of Mexico. It was also the only former viceroyalty of the Spanish Empire to establish a monarchy after gaining independence. The empire existed from 1821 to 1823, making it one of the few modern-era independent monarchies in the Americas. To distinguish it from the later Second Mexican Empire (1864–1867) under Emperor Maximilian, this historical period is commonly referred to as the First Mexican Empire. The empire was led by former Royal Spanish military officer Agustín de Iturbide, who ruled as Agustín I.

The establishment of a monarchy was the initial goal for an independent Mexico, as outlined in the Plan of Iguala, a political document drafted by Iturbide that unified the forces fighting for independence from Spain. Following the signing of the Treaty of Córdoba by the last Spanish viceroy in September 1821, the plan for a Mexican monarchy advanced. Iturbide's popularity reached its peak on May 18, 1822, when public demonstrations called for him to become emperor in the absence of a European royal willing to assume the throne. The Mexican Congress approved the proposal, and Iturbide was crowned in July 1822.

The empire's brief existence was marked by challenges, including disputes over its legitimacy, conflicts between the Congress and the emperor, and a bankrupt national treasury. In October 1822, Iturbide dissolved Congress and replaced it with the National Institutional Junta, composed of his supporters. However, by December of the same year, he began to lose the support of the Mexican Army, which rebelled in favor of restoring the Congress and its democratic powers. Unable to suppress the revolt, Iturbide reconvened the Congress in March 1823 and offered his abdication. Power was then transferred to a republican provisional government of 1823-1824, which abolished the monarchy and established the First Mexican Republic.

== Background ==
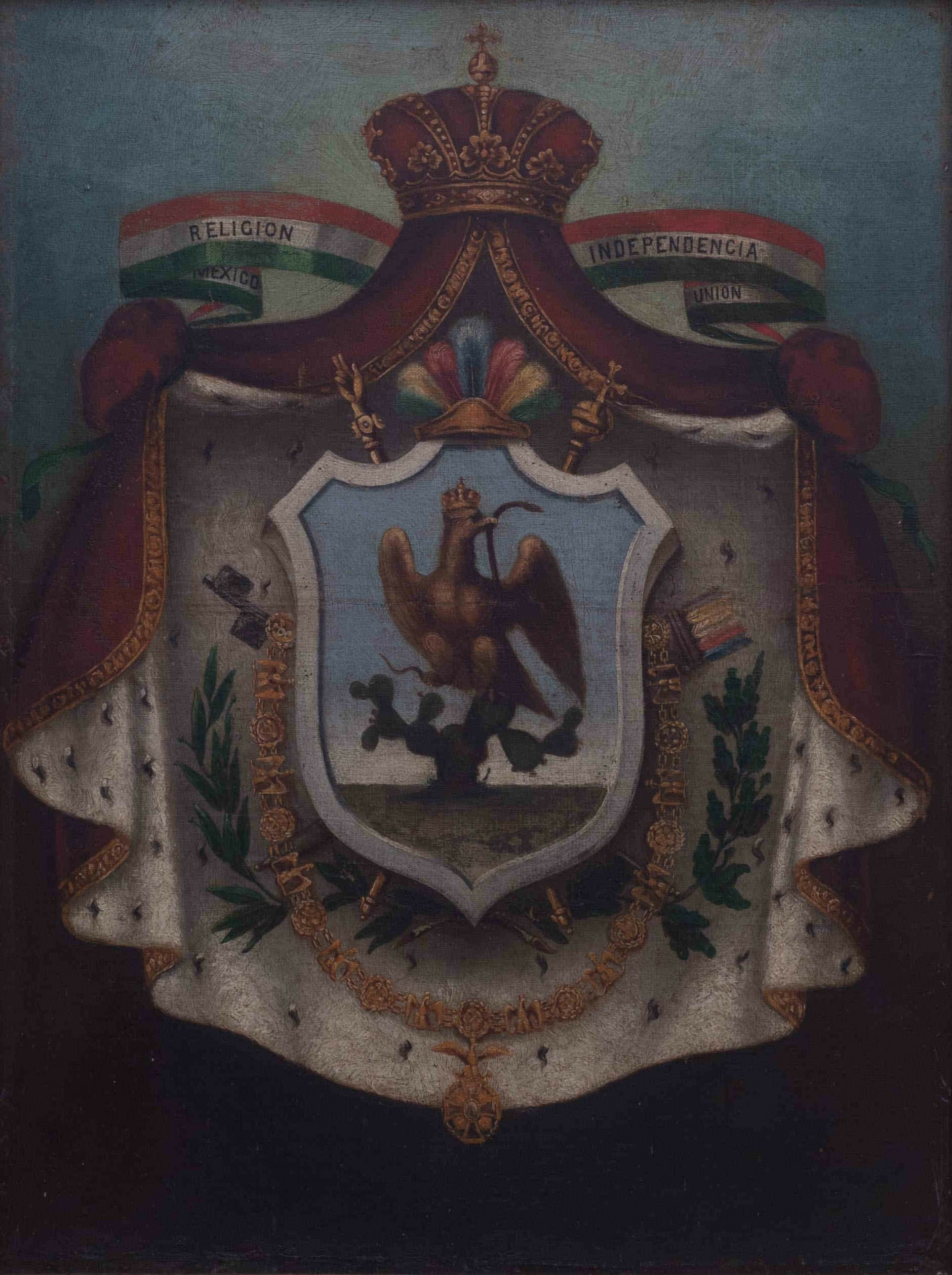
Coat of arms of the First Mexican Empire.

The Spanish Empire disintegrated in the wake of Napoleon's invasion of Spain and the overthrow of the Spanish Bourbons in 1808. Throughout Spain and its viceroyalties there was a widespread refusal to recognize Napoleon's brother Joseph I as the new French-backed king of Spain. In New Spain cleric Miguel Hidalgo y Costilla, who had long been part of a circle of intellectuals who sought to reform the colonial system, triggered the Mexican War of Independence in 1810, a decade of warfare between insurgents for independence from Spain and royalists seeking to maintain the existing colonial order. The insurgency was initially led by Hidalgo, who was captured and executed in 1811, then succeeded by Father José María Morelos, who was likewise captured and executed in 1815. Remaining insurgents, including Vicente Guerrero, waged guerrilla warfare in the countryside of southern Mexico. Agustín de Iturbide was a Mexican officer in the Spanish army, a member of the Mexican elite loyal to Spain. When Liberals in Spain seized power in 1820, re-established the Spanish Constitution of 1812, forcing limits on the power of Ferdinand VII of Spain and curtailing privileges of established elites and institutions, Mexican elites saw their interests threatened. In view of this, Iturbide sought an alliance with Mexican insurgents, drawing up the Plan of Iguala and gaining the support of insurgent leader Vicente Guerrero and others. They created the Army of the Three Guarantees, which brought about Mexican independence from Spain in September 1821.

The newly constituted movement involved three principles, or "guarantees": that Mexico would be an independent constitutional monarchy governed by a Spanish prince; that Americanos, that is all Mexicans regardless of ethnic category and those born in Spain would henceforth enjoy equal rights and privileges; and that the Roman Catholic Church would retain its privileges and position as the official and exclusive religion of the land. These Three Guarantees formed the core of the Plan of Iguala, the blueprint which, by combining the goal of independence and a constitution with the preservation of Catholic monarchy and Roman Catholicism, brought together all Mexican factions. Under the 24 February 1821 Plan of Iguala, to which most of the provinces subscribed, the Mexican Congress established a regency council which was headed by Iturbide.

Viceroy Juan O'Donojú acceded to the Mexican insurgents' demands, having no other option because he lacked independent resources. He signed the Treaty of Córdoba on 24 August 1821. The Mexican Congress intended to establish a personal union, similar to the arrangement now found among the Commonwealth realms; Ferdinand would remain King of Spain and separately take the throne of a new Mexican kingdom, independent of Spain but sharing a monarch. If the Spanish king refused the position, the plan provided for another member of the House of Bourbon to accede to the Mexican throne. Commissioners from Mexico were sent to Spain to offer the Mexican throne to a Spanish royal, but the Spanish state refused to recognize Mexico's independence and would not allow any other Spanish prince to accept the throne.

== Election of the Emperor ==
With Ferdinand VII having rejected the Treaty of Cordoba, Iturbide's supporters saw an opportunity to place their candidate on the throne. On the night of 18 May, the 1st infantry regiment, stationed at the ex Convent of San Hipólito, and led by sergeant Pio Marcha began a public demonstration in favor of Iturbide being made emperor. The demonstration was joined by other barracks and many civilians as well. When the public demonstration reached his home, Iturbide himself was able to address the demonstrators from his balcony. He consulted with members of the regency on what course to follow, and eventually acquiesced to the demonstrators' demands, agreeing that he should be made emperor. The crowd celebrated the rest of the night with fireworks and celebratory gunfire.

An extraordinary session of congress was held the following morning to deal with the subject of Iturbide's coronation. At the opening of the session, the military addressed a manifesto to congress, endorsing Iturbide to be emperor. The deliberations then started with a few deputies expressing concern that congress was not entirely free in the present circumstances to proceed on the matter. A pro-Iturbide crowd outside of the hall was making so much noise that it was interfering with the deliberations, and congress asked Iturbide to show up in an unsuccessful attempt to calm the crowds. The opposition brought up concerns that a popular demonstration in the capital was not enough of a basis upon which to elect Iturbide and that the provinces ought to be consulted first. A proposal was made to gain the consent of two thirds of the provinces, and this succeeding then to appoint a commission to write a provisional constitution in order to avoid constitutional crises.

Deputy Valentín Gómez Farías, future president of Mexico, stood up for the legality of congress to elect an emperor. He praised Iturbide's services to the nation, and argued that as Spain had rejected the Treaty of Córdoba, Congress was now authorized by that very treaty to hold an election to decide who the emperor was to be. The vote then proceeded. In the final results, sixty-seven deputies voted in favor of making Iturbide Emperor, while fifteen voted against. The vote however was short of a legal quorum of one hundred and two deputies. Congress, nonetheless resigned itself to the situation, and a plan to establish a constitutional monarchy united both conservatives and liberals at a time when it was uncertain which form of government would be best for independent Mexico.

== Coronation ==
Congress published an oath binding the emperor to obey the constitution, which Iturbide subsequently took, and Congress also declared the Mexican monarchy to be hereditary, granting titles of nobility to Iturbide's family. His son and heir became Prince Imperial of Mexico. The 19th of May was made a national holiday, and a royal household was organized. 21 July 1822 was set as the date of the official coronation.

Iturbide's court was being set up to be more luxurious than that of the former Spanish Viceroy, a situation which provoked opposition in a new nation that was essentially bankrupt. To remedy the financial difficulties, the Mexican government prohibited the exportation of money, and exacted a forced loan of 600,000 pesos in Mexico City, Puebla, Guadalajara, and Veracruz. During this time, a council of state was also formed, being made up of thirteen members selected by the Emperor from a list of thirty one nominees submitted by congress.

The coronation took place on 21 July. The capital was decked out in floral arrangements, banners, streamers, and flags. The government could not afford to forge a crown, and therefore jewels and gems had to be borrowed, but ultimately a signet ring, a scepter and crowns were produced. Costumes were made based on drawings of Napoleon's coronation. Congress met on the morning of the coronation, and then divided itself into two deputations to escort the emperor and the empress to the National Cathedral. In the cathedral, the emperor and the empress were to be seated on thrones next to the newly ennobled Mexican princes and princesses. Upon reaching the cathedral, the emperor and empress were escorted to their thrones, and the imperial regalia were placed on the altar. The regalia were blessed and Iturbide was crowned by the president of the congress.

== Government ==

Ministries of the Mexican Empire
Office	Name	Term
Foreign and Interior Relations	José Manuel de Herrera	19 May 1822 – 10 August 1822
Andrés Quintana Roo	11 August 1822 – 22 February 1823
José Cecilio del Valle	23 February 1823 – 31 March 1823
Justice and Ecclesiastical Affairs	José Dominguez Manzo	19 May 1822 – 10 February 1823
Juan Gómez Navarrete	11 February 1823 – 29 March 1823
Treasury	Rafael Pérez Maldonado	19 May 1822 – 30 June 1822
Antonio de Medina	1 July 1822 – 31 March 1823
War and Marine	Antonio de Medina	19 May 1822 – 30 June 1822
Manuel de la Sota Riva	1 July 1822 – 23 March 1823
Francisco de Arrillaga	24 March 1823 – 31 March 1823

Congress and the Emperor immediately began to clash, in large part because their respective legal powers had not at this point been clearly delineated. By mid 1822 the three major issues were whether Iturbide had a right to appoint members to a Supreme Court, whether he had the right to veto legislation as the Spanish King had under the Spanish Constitution of 1812, and his wish to establish rural military tribunals. The latter measure was in response to the lapse in law and order that was spreading throughout the country. Iturbide wished to establish in provincial capitals special courts made up of two military officers assisted by a lawyer. They were to keep track of seditious plots, but also in cases of murder, robbery or injury, and with the permission of the district captain general, the courts would be allowed to disregard statutes that would interfere with quickly carrying out judicial processes. Congress however, was opposed to the project. All the while, work on a constitution for the Empire was being neglected. Iturbide's greatest enemy in congress was deputy Servando Teresa de Mier, a staunch republican, who would often ridicule the Emperor and his pageantry.

=== Arrest of the Deputies ===
In August 1822, a conspiracy to overthrow the Emperor was discovered. The conspirators, claiming that Iturbide's election was illegal, plotted to rise up in the capital, move the congress to Texcoco and declare the establishment of a Republic. On 26 and 27 August, fifteen deputies suspected of being involved with the plot, including Mier, Carlos María de Bustamante, Francisco Tagle, José del Valle, and José Joaquín de Herrera were arrested. Congress was shocked by the arrests, which had included some of its most prominent deputies, and on the morning of 27 August, the legislature sent a letter to the military upholding the immunity of congress, and accusing the arresting authorities of acting in an extra-legal fashion. Secretary of Interior Relations, Andrés Quintana Roo replied that by virtue of the Spanish Constitution of 1812, the government had the authority to arrest deputies suspected of being involved in a treasonous conspiracy, and that congress would remain informed on the results of the ongoing investigation. Congress preferred to try the suspected deputies itself, but the matter was rejected. The prosecution against the accused did not get very far and a few were liberated around Christmas, 1822. One of the arrested, José del Valle would actually go on to be appointed foreign minister by Iturbide a few months later.

=== Dissolution of Congress ===
Afterwards followed controversies over reconstituting Congress. The convocation that had established congress had also directed it to divide itself into two chambers, which had not been done. The body remained united on the pretext of drafting a new constitution and it considered itself a sovereign constitutional congress. It did not view itself bound in any way by the 1812 Spanish Constitution which remained the de facto constitution of Mexico. At this point no consistent relationship had been established between population and the number of deputies, and the congress as it stood was starting to become a burdensome expense. Deputy Lorenzo de Zavala brought up these concerns and proposed to reduce the number of deputies and also to divide the body into two chambers, a proposal which the emperor found very agreeable. On October 16, Iturbide gathered several deputies and generals at his home, and began to discuss the measure of dissolving congress under the pretext that it did not as it stood, proportionally represent the provinces.

The following day, members of the council of state, the generals based in Mexico City, and more than forty deputies gathered at Iturbide's home for a conference regarding the problems with congress. He addressed them and accused congress of not having taken a single step in eight months towards writing a constitution, of not passing a single law regarding finances or the military, and of rather focusing their time on attacking the emperor. Various deputies added to the discussion, and brought forth the point that if congress needed to be reformed, the proposal ought to come from congress itself. The ultimate result of this conference was a proposal to reduce congress to seventy deputies. On October 17, 1822, the latter proposal was presented to congress. Congress rejected the measure, but a compromise was reached by which the legislature agreed to abide by the Spanish Constitution of 1812 as a provisional constitution, allowing Iturbide a veto over legislation, and the right to select members of the supreme court.

Iturbide however then sought for more concessions, arguing that his veto ought to extend to any article of any new constitution that congress would draft, and also continued to insist on reducing the number of deputies in congress. These grabs for power alienated even conservatives, and Iturbide's proposals were rejected, which Iturbide then responded to by dissolving congress on 31 October 1822. Brigadier Luis Cortazar was placed in charge of dissolving the congress, and the deputies dispersed without protest or violence. Iturbide's pretext was that congress had accomplished nothing in the eight months it had been in session, work on a constitution had not begun despite that being the main purpose for its convocation, and that the matters of justice and finance had been completely neglected.

=== Financial Problems ===
To replace congress, Iturbide established a National Institutional Junta made up of forty five members, chosen from among friendly deputies. The junta was installed officially on 2 November 1822, and vested with the legislative power, until a new congress could be formed. Iturbide entrusted the body with writing up regulations for producing a new congress, but also began to focus on the grave financial issues that the Empire was facing. On 5 November 1822, the junta authorized a forced loan of over two million pesos, and the seizure of more than one million pesos waiting for exportation out of the country in the port of Veracruz.

Iturbide also began to issue paper currency, and on 20 December, the government authorized the printing of four million pesos worth of banknotes, in denominations of one, two, and ten. These were issued to all financial offices of the Empire, where they were to be used in a ratio of 1:2 with silver coin in payment of all government of obligations. Anyone who owed money to the government was allowed to make one third of the payment in notes and two thirds in coin.

== Revolt against the Emperor ==
The last Spanish stronghold in Mexico, was Fort of San Juan de Ulúa on a small island off the coast of Veracruz. There had been a change in command at the fort during this time, and general Antonio López de Santa Anna, stationed in Veracruz planned a scheme of taking possession of it by feigning the surrender of Veracruz to its new commander. When Echevarri, the captain-general of the local provinces, arrived in Veracruz, he approved of the plan, and agreed to join in on it, positioning his troops in Veracruz to ambush the landing Spaniards, having been promised support by Santa Anna. On 26 October 1822, as the Spaniards landed however, Santa Anna's troops failed to arrive, and Echevarri barely defeated the landing party, and the Spanish ultimately kept control of the fort. Echevarri expressed his suspicion to Iturbide that it had all been a scheme by Santa Anna to get Echeverri killed as revenge for Santa Anna not having been appointed Captain-General himself. Iturbide himself went to Veracruz to dismiss Santa Anna from his command, not overtly however but rather under the pretext of simply moving him to a different post in Mexico City. However, Santa Anna suspecting his ruin, instead took command of his troops and in December, 1822 started a rebellion in favour of a republican form of government.

Vicente Guerrero and Nicolás Bravo, defected from the ranks of the imperialists, and proceeded to Chilapa on 5 January 1823 to join the revolution, but experienced a disastrous defeat at Almolonga. The insurrection was mostly being suppressed at this time, Victoria being held in check at Puente del Rey, and Santa Anna still confined at Veracruz.

Echevarri was sent to take care of the rebellion in Veracruz, with more than three thousand well supplied troops, but ended up defecting. At this point, the opposition to the government began to negotiate with the military. On 1 February 1823 a junta including many military chiefs, and the liberal diplomat Miguel Santa María met in Veracruz to proclaim the Plan of Casa Mata. The army pledged itself to restore Congress while disavowing any intention of harming the person of the Emperor, or of overthrowing the Mexican monarchy. On 14 February, Puebla proclaimed for the plan, followed by San Luis Potosí, and Guadalajara. By March, most of Mexico had proclaimed in favour of the plan. A military junta was formed in Jalapa, to represent the Plan of Casa Mata.

== Iturbide's abdication ==
On 4 March 1823, Iturbide issued a decree reconvening Congress, and the deputies met on 7 March. Iturbide addressed the session, hoping to reach a negotiation and avoid conflict, but the deputies listened coldly. The military junta refused to recognize the Congress until its liberty was guaranteed. On 19 March, Iturbide fearing his imminent overthrowal, summoned congress to an extraordinary session and presented his abdication. Congress proposed that the military junta meet with Iturbide about the matter, but the junta refused, instead proposing that Iturbide remove himself from the capital, and await the decision of Congress. On 26 March, an agreement was reached by which the junta would recognize Iturbide on whatever terms Congress would grant him. Iturbide also agreed to remove himself from the capital, and the command of the capital was handed over to the revolutionary troops and power passed over to the Provisional Government of Mexico.

== Territory ==
Provinces of the Empire. Treaty of Córdoba Acquisitions (1822–1823)

The territory of the Mexican Empire corresponded to the borders of Viceroyalty of New Spain, excluding the Captaincies General of Cuba, Santo Domingo and the Philippines. The Central American lands of the former Captaincy General of Guatemala were annexed to the Empire shortly after its establishment.

Under the First Empire, Mexico reached its greatest territorial extent, stretching from northern California to the provinces of Central America (excluding Panama, which was then part of Colombia), which had not initially approved becoming part of the Mexican Empire but joined the Empire shortly after their independence.

After the emperor abdicated, on March 29 the departing Mexican general Vicente Filísola called for a new Central American Congress to convene and on July 1, 1823 the Central American provinces formed the Federal Republic of Central America, with only the province of Chiapas choosing to remain a part of Mexico as a state. Subsequent territorial evolution of Mexico over the next several decades (principally cessions to the United States) would eventually reduce Mexico to less than half its maximum extent.

=== Political subdivisions ===
The First Mexican empire was divided into the following intendances:

- Las Californias
- México
- Nuevo México
- Texas
- Nueva Vizcaya
- Coahuila
- Nuevo Reino de León
- Nuevo Santander
- Estado de Occidente
- Zacatecas
- San Luis de Potosí
- Guanajuato
- Querétaro
- Puebla
- Guadalajara
- Oaxaca
- Mérida de Yucatán
- Valladolid
- Veracruz
- Guatemala
- Honduras
- El Salvador
- Nicaragua
- Costa Rica

== See also ==
- Central America under Mexican rule
- Federal Republic of Central America
- History of Mexico
- Monarchism in Mexico
- Imperial Crown of Mexico
- List of Emperors of Mexico
- Mexican Imperial Orders
- Second Mexican Empire
- Mexican War of Independence
