= Ramón Sagredo =

Mexican painter and photographer

- Born: 1834; Real del Monte, Hidalgo, Mexico
- Died: 1870 (aged 35–36); Mexico City
- Education: San Carlos Academy
- Known for: Painting, photography
- Patrons: Maximilian I of Mexico

Ramón Sagredo (1834–1870) was a Mexican painter and photographer who worked under the patronage of Emperor Maximilian and decorated the former cupola of "La Profesa" with the Catalan master Pelegrí Clavé.

Trained at San Carlos Academy from 1854 to 1859, he received praise for his Jesus on the road to Emmaus (including a positive review by Cuba's national poet José Martí). Under sponsorship of Maximilian of Mexico, he went on to decorate Iturbide Hall at the Imperial Palace (current Ambassador's Hall at the National Palace) with a full-length, posthumous portrait of Vicente Guerrero. He also worked with Clavé on the former cupola of La Profesa (ravaged by a fire in January 1914) and at San Carlos' galleries.

By the end of the Reform War, his personal finances were dwindling. Following the example of many of his contemporaries, he ventured into photography by painting over photographic enlargements for a fraction of the cost of paintings. According to an 1862 newspaper article quoted by Oliver Debroise:

[Ramón Sagredo and other artists] sacrificed their best years and resources to a most beautiful art that is, unfortunately, little appreciated [...] Consequently, they have abandoned those studies that cost them so dearly [...] Today they contribute their talents and the fruit of their long vigils to the profit of photographers who, employing them in the coloring of photographic portraits for the paltry stipend of one-third of their value, take advantage of the labor of these former students of the Academy.

Later on, as a photographer, he formed short-lived associations with Luis Veraza (1864), for whom he started coloring at Espíritu Santo 17 ½; and the Valleto brothers (Sagredo, Valleto y Ca.,1865) at Vergara 7, before setting up his own studio in the Mexican capital.

He committed suicide on June 2, 1870, as a result of his passion for Maura Ogazón and Rubio, sister of Governor Pedro Ogazón Rubio.

== Selected works ==
- Jesús en el camino a Emaús (Jesus on the road to Emmaus) shown at the gallery of the Palace of Fine Arts in Mexico City.
- La muerte de Sócrates (The Death of Socrates), exhibited at the National Museum of San Carlos.
- Ismael abandonado en el desierto (Ishmael Abandoned in the Desert), exhibited at the Querétaro Museum of Art.
Gallery

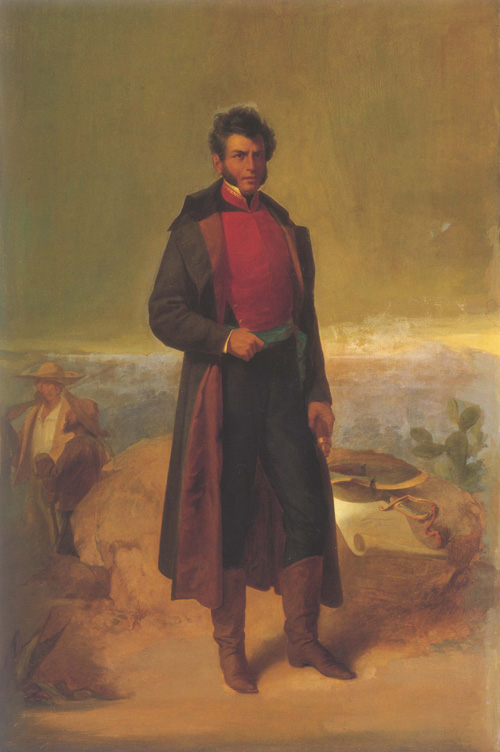
Vicente Guerrero (circa 1865), a full-length, posthumous portrait of the Mexican liberator exhibited at Ambassador's Hall (National Palace).

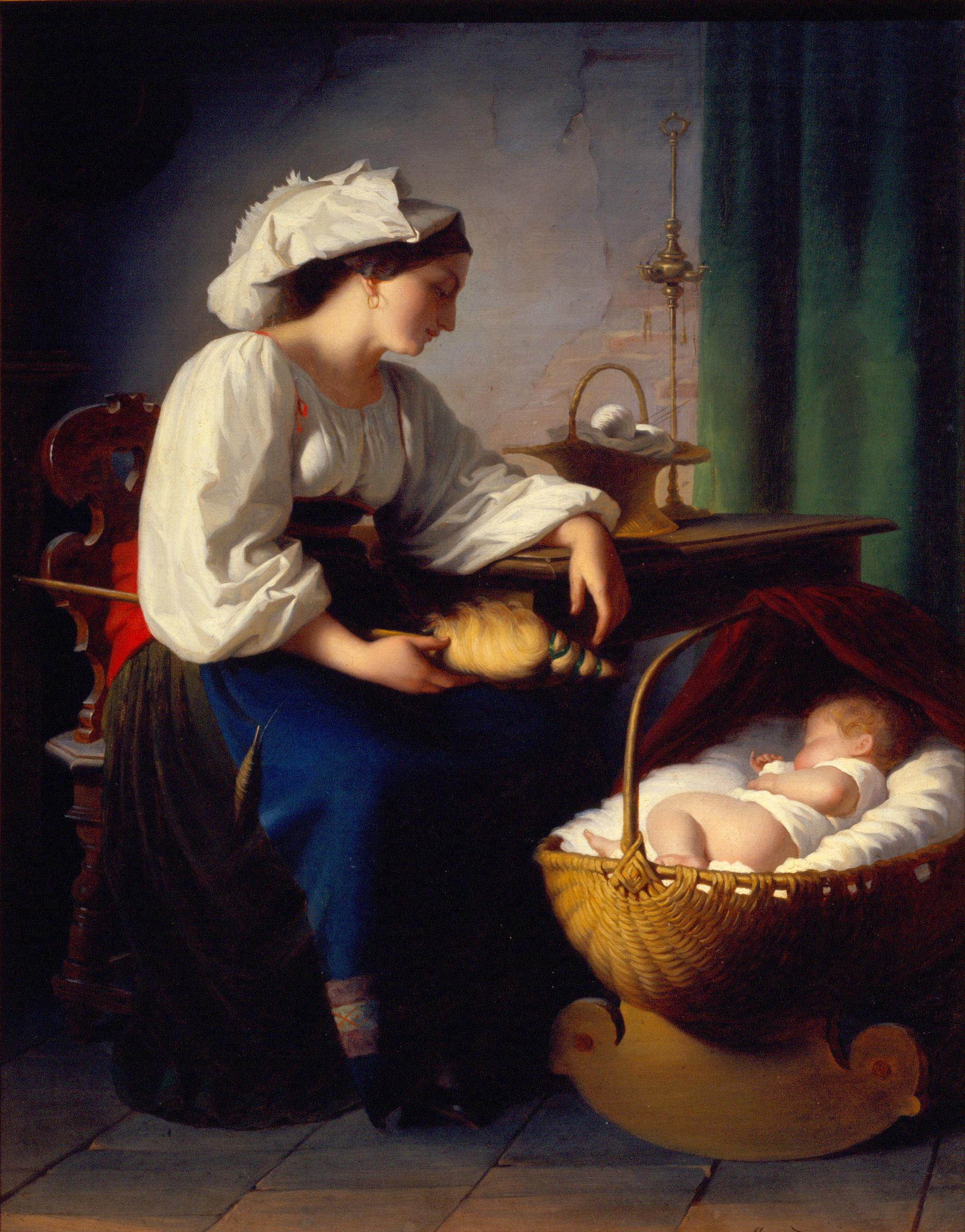
Motherly love (1857)
