= 1829 in Mexico =

- Decades: 1800s; 1810s; 1820s; 1830s; 1840s
- See also: History of Mexico; List of years in Mexico; Timeline of Mexican history

Events in the year 1829 in Mexico.

== Incumbents ==
- Guadalupe Victoria – President of Mexico until April 1
- Vicente Guerrero – interim President of Mexico, April 1 until December 17
- José María Bocanegra – interim President of Mexico, December 18 until December 23
- Pedro Vélez, Lucas Alamán, and Luis de Quintanar – Executive Triumvirate, December 23 until December 31

=== Governors ===
- Chiapas: José Diego Lara
- Chihuahua: José Antonio Arce Hinojos
- Coahuila: José María Viesca
- Durango:
- Guanajuato:
- Jalisco: José Justo Corro/José Ignacio Cañedo y Arróniz
- State of Mexico:
- Michoacán: José Trinidad Salgado
- Nuevo León: Manuel Gómez Castro/Joaquín García
- Oaxaca:
- Puebla:
- Querétaro:
- San Luis Potosí:
- Sonora:
- Tabasco:
- Tamaulipas: Lucas Fernandez/José Antonio Fernández Izaguirre/Francisco Vital Fernandez
- Veracruz: Antonio López de Santa Anna/Sebastián Camacho Castilla
- Yucatán:
- Zacatecas:

== Events ==
- April 1 – Vicente Guerrero is sworn as President of Mexico.
- September 16 - President Guerrero formally abolished slavery in Mexico, except in the Isthmus of Tehuantepec in the south of the country
- December 4 – the Plan of Jalapa is formed in Xalapa demanding the removal of Vicente Guerrero as president

== Notable births ==
- March 24 – Ignacio Zaragoza, General of the Mexican Army best known for his 1862 victory against the French forces during the Battle of Puebla on May 5.
- July 5 – Ignacio Mariscal, distinguished lawyer, diplomat and Liberal member.

== Notable deaths ==
- March 2 – Josefa Ortiz de Domínguez, conspirator and supporter of the Mexican War of Independence.
