= 1831 in Mexico =

- Decades: 1810s; 1820s; 1830s; 1840s; 1850s
- See also: History of Mexico; List of years in Mexico; Timeline of Mexican history

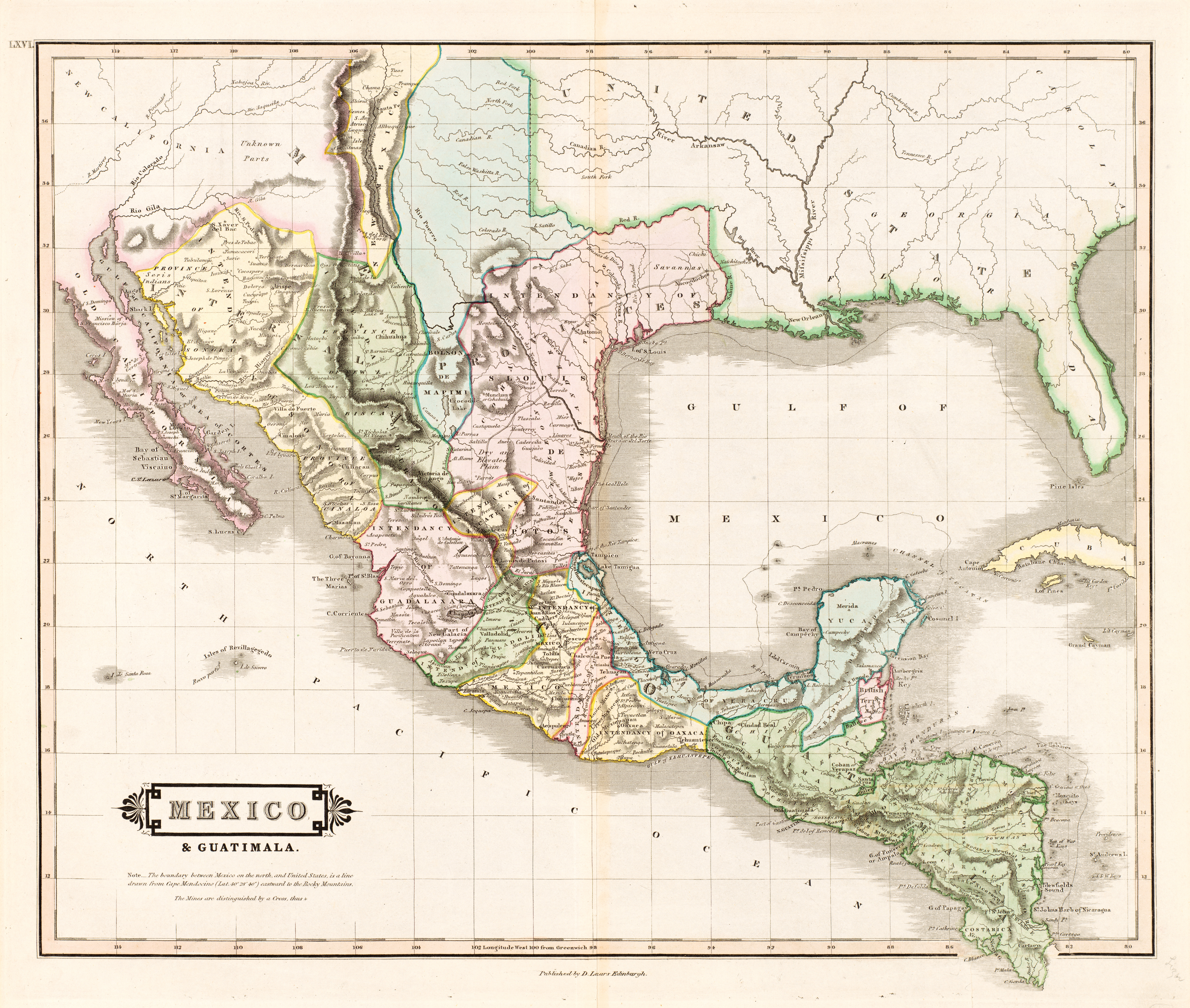
Map of Mexico in 1831

Events in the year 1831 in Mexico.

== Incumbents ==
- Anastasio Bustamante – President of Mexico
- Pedro José de Fonte y Hernández Miravete – Archbishop of Mexico

=== Governors ===
- Chiapas: José Ignacio Gutiérrez
- Chihuahua:
- Coahuila: Ramón Músquiz/José María Viesca/José María de Letona/Ramón Músquiz
- Durango:
- Guanajuato:
- Guerrero:
- Jalisco: José Ignacio Herrera y Cairo/José Ignacio Cañedo y Arróniz
- State of Mexico:
- Michoacán:
- Nuevo León: Joaquín García
- Oaxaca:
- Puebla:
- Querétaro: Manuel López de Ecala
- San Luis Potosí:
- Sinaloa:
- Sonora:
- Tabasco:
- Tamaulipas: Juan Guerra/Francisco Vital Fernandez
- Veracruz:
- Yucatán:
- Zacatecas:

== Events ==
As a result of a rebellion that Vicente Guerrero led against Anastasio Bustamante, Guerrero was captured and executed in Oaxaca, Mexico on 14 February.

Benito Juarez, who later served as the president of Mexico from 1858 to 1872, first entered politics as a liberal.

== Popular culture ==
=== Literature ===
- José Joaquín Fernández de Lizardi's El Periquillo Sarniento is published.

== Notable births ==
- 12 September – Macedonio Alcalá in Oaxaca, Oaxaca (died 1869)

== Notable deaths ==
- 31 January – Juan Francisco Azcárate y Ledesma died in Mexico City (born 1767)
- 14 February – Vicente Guerrero, leader of Mexican War of Independence and 2nd President of Mexico, assassinated (b. 1782)
