= 1830 in Mexico =

- Decades: 1810s; 1820s; 1830s; 1840s; 1850s
- See also: History of Mexico; List of years in Mexico; Timeline of Mexican history

Events in the year 1830 in Mexico.

== Incumbents ==
- Anastasio Bustamante – President of Mexico during all of 1830

=== Governors ===
- Chiapas: Joaquín Miguel Gutiérrez/José Ignacio Gutiérrez
- Chihuahua: José Antonio Arce Hinojos/José Andrés Luján del Castillo/José Antonio Arce Hinojos/José Isidro Madero
- Coahuila: José María Viesca/Ramón Músquiz
- Durango:
- Guanajuato:
- Guerrero:
- Jalisco: José Ignacio Cañedo y Arróniz/José Ignacio Herrera y Cairo/Ramón Navarro/Juan Nepomuceno Cumplido/José Ignacio Cañedo y Arróniz/José Ignacio Herrera y Cairo
- State of Mexico:
- Michoacán: José Trinidad Salgado/Diego Moreno Jasso
- Nuevo León: Joaquín García
- Oaxaca:
- Puebla:
- Querétaro: Ramón Covarrubias/Manuel López de Ecala
- San Luis Potosí:
- Sinaloa:
- Sonora:
- Tabasco:
- Tamaulipas: Francisco Vital Fernandez/Enrique Camilo Suarez/Jose Manuel Zozaya/Enrique Camilo Suarez/Jose Manuel Zozaya/Juan Guerra
- Veracruz: Sebastián Camacho Castilla/Antonio López de Santa Anna
- Yucatán:
- Zacatecas:

== Events ==
- April 6 – The Law of April 6, 1830 was passed encouraging Mexican settlement and forbidding American settlement within Coahuila y Tejas

== Notable births ==
- September 15 – Porfirio Díaz, 29th President of Mexico (d. 1915 in France)

== Notable deaths ==
- March 27 – Luis Antonio Argüello former governor of Alta California died in San Francisco
- April 8 – José María Estudillo an early settler and leader of San Diego
- April 22 – Miguel Domínguez former head of the Supreme Executive Power transitional government died in Mexico City

=== Unknown dates ===
- Magin Catalá – Franciscan missionary in Santa Clara, California
