= 1787 =

1787 in various calendars
- Gregorian calendar: 1787; MDCCLXXXVII
- Ab urbe condita: 2540
- Armenian calendar: 1236; ԹՎ ՌՄԼԶ
- Assyrian calendar: 6537
- Balinese saka calendar: 1708–1709
- Bengali calendar: 1193–1194
- Berber calendar: 2737
- British Regnal year: 27 Geo. 3 – 28 Geo. 3
- Buddhist calendar: 2331
- Burmese calendar: 1149
- Byzantine calendar: 7295–7296
- Chinese calendar: 丙午年 (Fire Horse); 4484 or 4277 — to — 丁未年 (Fire Goat); 4485 or 4278
- Coptic calendar: 1503–1504
- Discordian calendar: 2953
- Ethiopian calendar: 1779–1780
- Hebrew calendar: 5547–5548
- Hindu calendars
- Vikram Samvat: 1843–1844
- Shaka Samvat: 1708–1709
- Kali Yuga: 4887–4888
- Holocene calendar: 11787
- Igbo calendar: 787–788
- Iranian calendar: 1165–1166
- Islamic calendar: 1201–1202
- Japanese calendar: Tenmei 7 (天明７年)
- Javanese calendar: 1713–1714
- Julian calendar: Gregorian minus 11 days
- Korean calendar: 4120
- Minguo calendar: 125 before ROC 民前125年
- Nanakshahi calendar: 319
- Thai solar calendar: 2329–2330
- Tibetan calendar: མེ་ཕོ་རྟ་ལོ་ (male Fire-Horse); 1913 or 1532 or 760 — to — མེ་མོ་ལུག་ལོ་ (female Fire-Sheep); 1914 or 1533 or 761

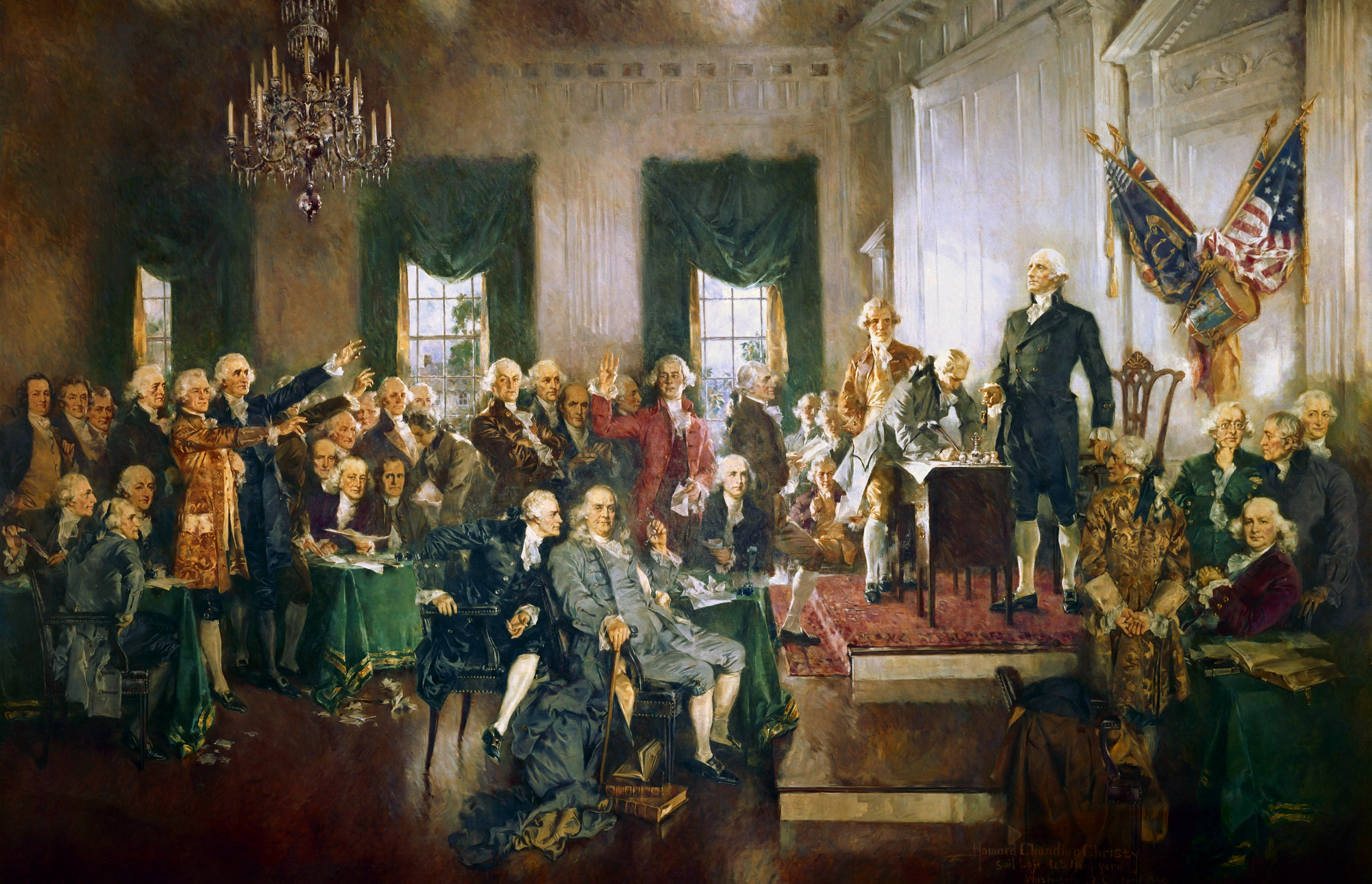
September 17: The United States Constitution is signed by delegates of the 13 member states in Philadelphia.

1787 (MDCCLXXXVII) was a common year starting on Monday of the Gregorian calendar and a common year starting on Friday of the Julian calendar, the 1787th year of the Common Era (CE) and Anno Domini (AD) designations, the 787th year of the 2nd millennium, the 87th year of the 18th century, and the 8th year of the 1780s decade. As of the start of 1787, the Gregorian calendar was 11 days ahead of the Julian calendar, which remained in localized use until 1923.

== Events ==
=== January–March ===
- January 9 – The North Carolina General Assembly authorizes nine commissioners to purchase 100 acres (0.40 km^{2}) of land for the seat of Chatham County. The town is named Pittsborough (later shortened to Pittsboro), for William Pitt the Younger.
- January 11 – William Herschel discovers Titania and Oberon, two moons of Uranus.
- January 19 – Mozart's Symphony No. 38 is premièred in Prague.
- February 2 – Arthur St. Clair of Pennsylvania is chosen as the new President of the Congress of the Confederation.
- February 4 – Shays' Rebellion in Massachusetts fails.
- February 21 – The Confederation Congress sends word to the 13 states that a convention will be held in Philadelphia on May 14 to revise the Articles of Confederation.
- February 28 – A charter is granted, establishing the institution which will become the University of Pittsburgh.
- March 3 – By a vote of 33 to 29, Harrisburg is approved as the new capital of Pennsylvania.
- March 17 – The Bank of North America, the central bank of the United States government under the Articles of Confederation, is re-incorporated after its charter had expired in 1786.
- March 28 – In the British House of Commons, Henry Beaufoy files the first motion to repeal the Test Act 1673, which restricts the rights of non-members of the Church of England; Beaufoy's motion is rejected, and the Act is not repealed until 1829.
- March 30 – Biblical theology becomes a separate discipline from biblical studies, as Johann Philipp Gabler delivers his speech "On the proper distinction between biblical and dogmatic theology and the specific objectives of each" upon his inauguration as the professor of theology at the University of Altdorf in Germany.

=== April–June ===
- April 2 – A Charter of Justice is signed, providing the authority for the establishment of the first New South Wales (i.e. Australian) Courts of Criminal and Civil Jurisdiction.
- April 19 – British astronomer Sir William Herschel notices three red glowing spots on the dark part of the Moon.
- April 25 – The Customs and Excise Act 1787 receives Royal assent. It replaced all customs duties, which included poundage, by a system where individual tariffs would be applied to importations.
- May 7 – The New Church (Swedenborgian) is founded in England.
- May 13 – Captain Arthur Phillip leaves Portsmouth, England, with the 11 ships of the First Fleet, carrying around 700 convicts and at least 300 crew and guards to establish a penal colony in Australia.
- May 14 – In Philadelphia, delegates begin arriving for a Constitutional Convention.
- May 22 – In Britain, Thomas Clarkson and Granville Sharp found the Society for Effecting the Abolition of the Slave Trade, with support from John Wesley, Josiah Wedgwood and others.
- May 25 – In Philadelphia, delegates begin to convene the Constitutional Convention, intended to amend the Articles of Confederation (however, a new United States Constitution is eventually produced). George Washington presides over the Convention.
- May – Orangist troops attack Vreeswijk, Harmelen and Maarssen; civil war starts in the Dutch Republic.
- May 31 – The original Lord's Cricket Ground in London holds its first cricket match; Marylebone Cricket Club founded.
- June 20 – Oliver Ellsworth moves at the Federal Convention that the government be called the United States.
- June 28 – Princess Wilhelmina of Orange, sister of King Frederick William II of Prussia, is captured by Dutch Republican patriots, taken to Goejanverwellesluis and not allowed to travel to The Hague.

=== July–September ===
- July 13 – The Congress of the Confederation enacts the Northwest Ordinance, establishing governing rules for the Northwest Territory (the future states of Ohio, Indiana, Illinois, Michigan and Wisconsin). It also establishes procedures for the admission of new states, and limits the expansion of slavery.
- July 18 – The United States ratifies its first treaty with the Sultanate of Morocco.
- August 9 – South Carolina cedes to the United States its claims to a 12-mile wide strip of land that runs across northern Alabama and Mississippi.
- August 10 – Wolfgang Amadeus Mozart composes his famous Eine kleine Nachtmusik.
- August 27 – Launching a 45-foot (14 m) steam powered craft on the Delaware River, John Fitch demonstrates the first U.S. patent for his design.
- September 4 – The first secondary school open to girls in Denmark, J. Cl. Todes Døtreskole, is founded in Copenhagen.
- September 13 – Prussian troops invade the Dutch Republic; two days later the Rhinegrave Salm gives up Utrecht. Within a few weeks 40,000 Patriots (out of a population of 2,000,000) go into exile in Northern France.
- September 17 – The United States Constitution is signed by the Constitutional Convention in Philadelphia.
- September 24 – Washington Academy (later Washington & Jefferson College) is chartered by the Pennsylvania General Assembly.

=== October–December ===
- October 1 – Russo-Turkish War (1787–1792): Battle of Kinburn – Alexander Suvorov, though sustaining a wound, routs the Turks.
- October 27 – The first of The Federalist Papers, a series of essays calling for ratification of the U.S. Constitution, is published in The Independent Journal, a New York newspaper.
- October 29 – Wolfgang Amadeus Mozart's opera Don Giovanni (libretto by Lorenzo Da Ponte) premieres in the Estates Theatre in Prague.
- November 1 – The first secondary school open to girls in Sweden, Societetsskolan, is founded in Gothenburg.
- November 21 – Treaty of Versailles (1787) signed, forming an alliance between the Kingdom of France and the Lord Nguyễn Phúc Ánh, future Emperor of Vietnam.
- December 3 – James Rumsey demonstrates his water-jet propelled boat on the Potomac River.
- December 7 – Delaware ratifies the Constitution, and becomes the first U.S. state.
- December 8 – La Purisima Mission is founded by Padre Fermín Lasuén as the eleventh of the Spanish missions in California.
- December 12 – Pennsylvania becomes the second U.S. state.
- December 18 – New Jersey becomes the third U.S. state.
- December 23 – Captain William Bligh sets sail from England for Tahiti, on HMS Bounty.

=== Date unknown ===
- Caroline Herschel is granted an annual salary of £50, by King George III of Great Britain, for acting as assistant to her brother William in astronomy.
- The North Carolina General Assembly incorporates Waynesborough, and designates it the seat for Wayne County, North Carolina. The town becomes extinct after 1865.
- Antoine Lavoisier is the first to suggest that silica is an oxide of a hitherto unknown metallic chemical element, later isolated and named silicon.
- A fossil bone recovered from Cretaceous strata at Woodbury, New Jersey is discussed by the American Philosophical Society in Philadelphia.

== Births ==
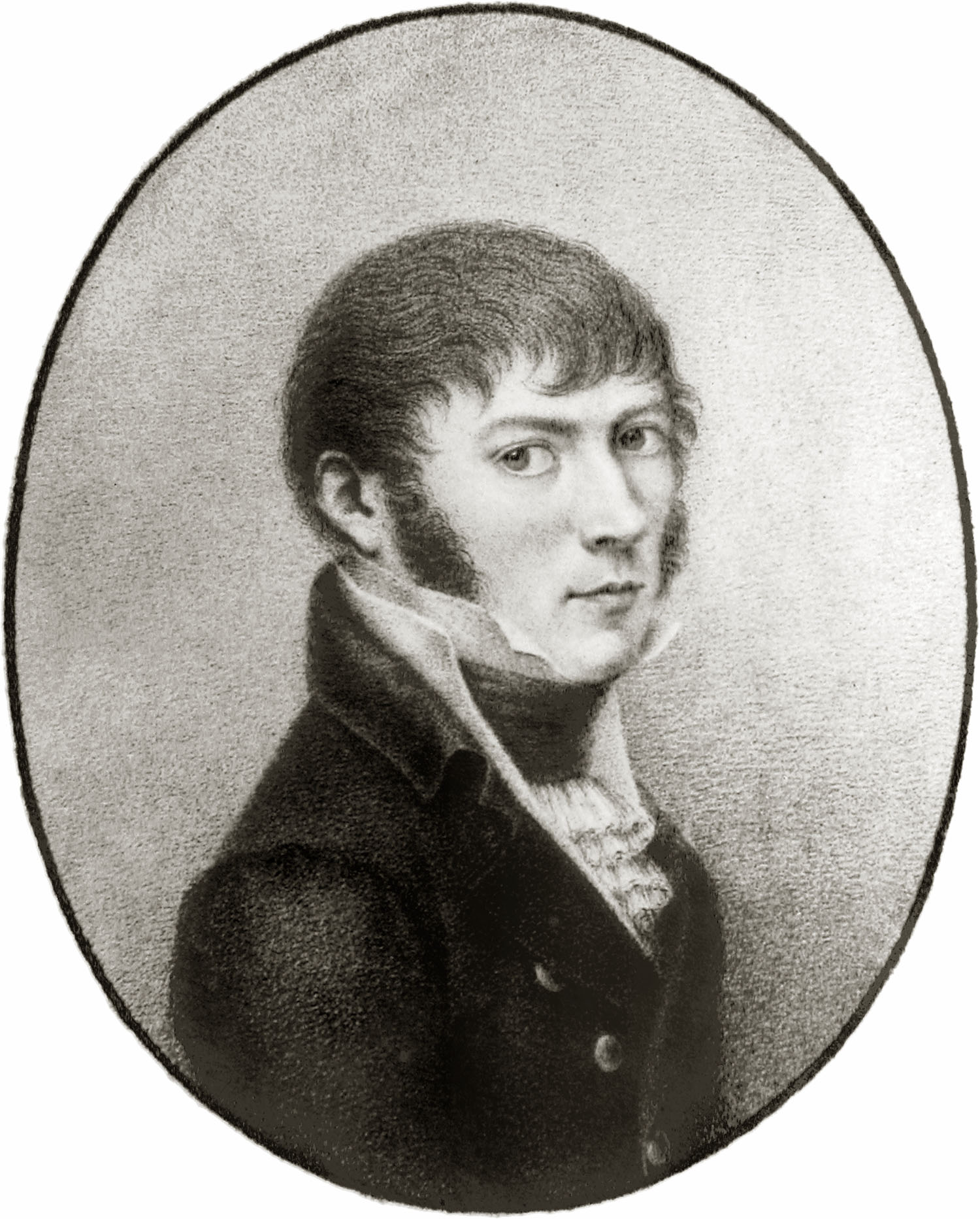
Joseph von Fraunhofer

- January 1 – Manuel José Arce, Revolutionary General and first President of The Federal Republic of Central America (d. 1847)
- February 10 – William Bradley, Britain's tallest man ever at 7 ft 9 in. (d. 1820)
- February 23 – Emma Willard, American educator (d. 1870)
- March 6 – Joseph von Fraunhofer, German optician (d. 1826)
- March 9 – Josephine Kablick, Czech botanist, paleontologist (d. 1863)
- March 10 – Francisco de Paula Martínez de la Rosa y Berdejo, Prime Minister of Spain (d. 1862)
- March 11 – Ivan Nabokov, Russian General (d. 1852)
- March 18 – Pieter Merkus, Governor-General of the Dutch East Indies (d. 1844)
- April 26 – Ludwig Uhland, German poet (d. 1862)
- May 25 – José María Bocanegra, 3rd President of Mexico (d. 1862)
- June 28 – Sir Harry Smith, English soldier, military commander (d. 1860)
- July 28 – Pedro Vélez, Mexican politician (d. 1848)
- August 21 – John Owen, 24th Governor of North Carolina (d. 1841)
- August 24 – James Weddell, British sailor known for discovering the Weddell Sea (d. 1834)
- September 5 – François Sulpice Beudant, French mineralogist, geologist (d. 1850)
- October 4, – François Guizot, Prime Minister of France (d. 1874)
- November 4 – Edmund Kean, English actor (d. 1833)
- November 7
  - Carl Carl, Polish-born actor and theatre director (d. 1854)
  - Vuk Stefanović Karadžić, Serbian linguist, major reformer of the Serbian language (d. 1864)

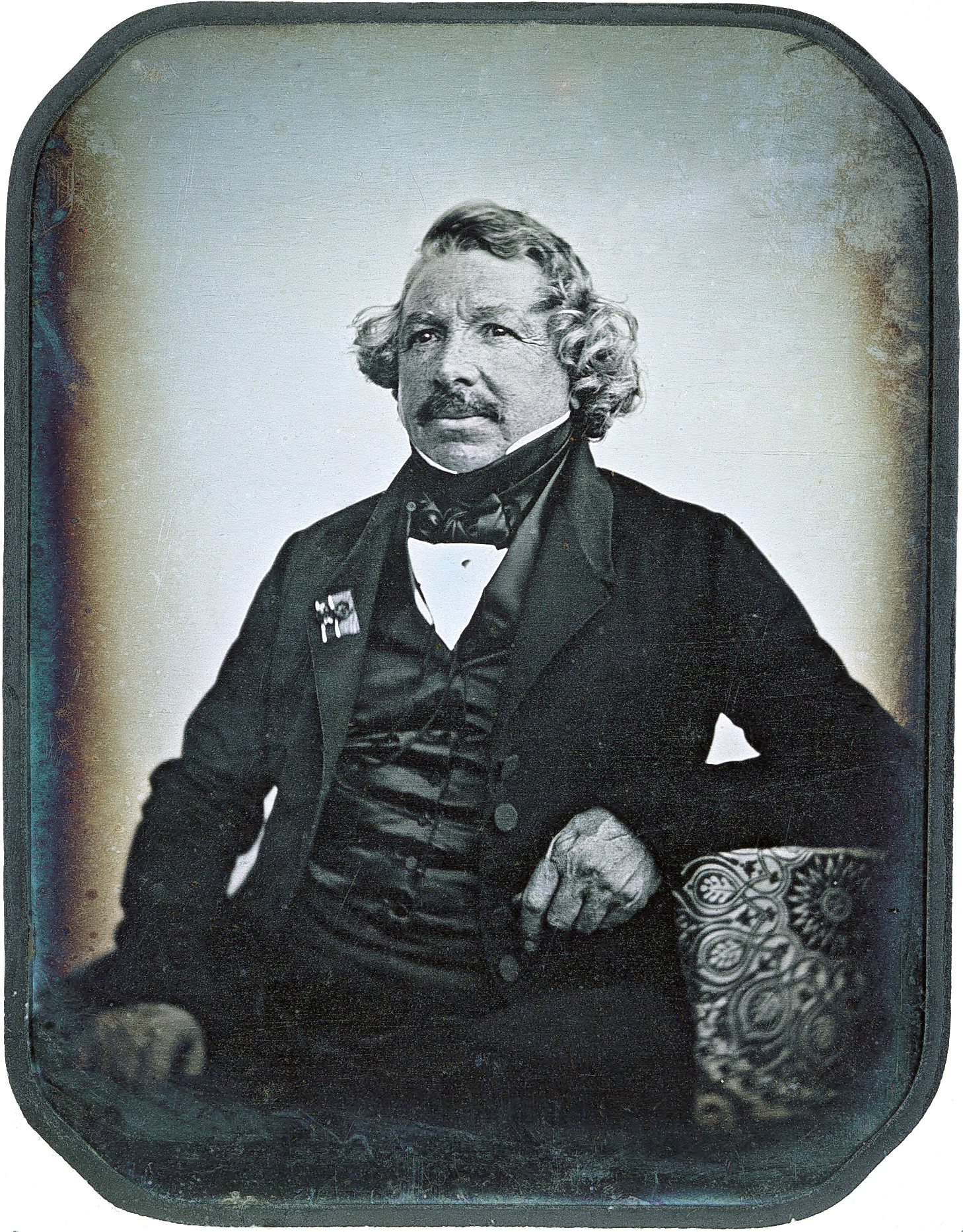
Louis Daguerre

- November 18 – Louis Daguerre, French artist, chemist (d. 1851)
- November 21 – Samuel Cunard, Canadian businessman, prominent Nova Scotian, founder of the Cunard Line (d. 1865)
- November 25 – Franz Xaver Gruber, Austrian composer (d. 1863)
- December 10 – Thomas Hopkins Gallaudet, American educator (d. 1851)
- December 11 – Macacha Güemes, Argentine heroine (d. 1866)
- December 16 – Mary Russell Mitford, English novelist and dramatist (d. 1855)
- December 17 – Jan Evangelista Purkyne, Czech anatomist, botanist (d. 1869)

=== Date unknown ===
- Juana Galán, Spanish heroine (d. 1812)
- Shaka, Zulu king (d. 1828)

== Deaths ==
- January 1 – Arthur Middleton, American politician (b. 1742)
- January 4 – Prince Joseph of Saxe-Hildburghausen, German prince (b. 1702)
- February 2 – Ignác Raab, Czech artist (b. 1715)
- February 5 – Hugh Farmer, British theologian (b. 1714)
- February 4 – Pompeo Batoni, Italian painter (b. 1708)

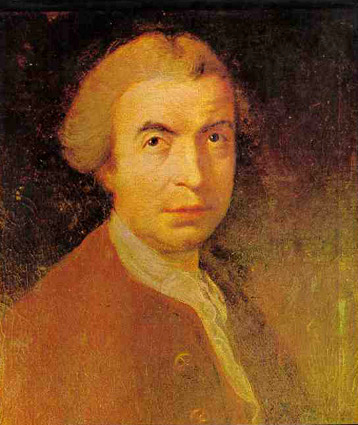
Roger Joseph Boscovich

- February 13
  - Rudjer Boscovich, Croatian scientist, diplomat (b. 1711)
  - Charles Gravier, comte de Vergennes, French statesman, diplomat (b. 1717)
- February 21 – Antonio Rodríguez de Hita, Spanish composer (b. 1722)
- February 28 – Princess Ulrike Friederike Wilhelmine of Hesse-Kassel, German princess (b. 1722)
- March 8 – Samuel Graves, British Royal Navy admiral (b. 1713)
- March 22 – Charles de Fitz-James, Marshal of France (b. 1712)
- April 2 – Thomas Gage, British general (b. 1719)
- May 10 – William Watson, English physician, scientist (b. 1715)
- May 26 – Lord John Murray, British politician (b. 1711)
- May 28 – Leopold Mozart, Austrian composer (b. 1719)
- May 31 – Felix of Nicosia, Cypriot Catholic saint (b. 1715)
- June 10 – La Caramba (Maria Antonia Fernandez), Spanish flamenco singer and dancer (b. 1751)
- June 14 – Johann Georg Dominicus von Linprun, German scientist (b. 1714)
- June 17 – José de Gálvez, Spanish politician (b. 1720)
- June 20 – Carl Friedrich Abel, German composer (b. 1723)
- July 4 – Charles, Prince of Soubise, Marshal of France (b. 1715)
- July 25 – Arthur Devis, British artist (b. 1712)
- August 1 – Alphonsus Liguori, Italian founder of the Redemptorist Order (b. 1696)
- August 7 – Francis Blackburne, English Anglican churchman, activist (b. 1705)
- August 13 – Marc Antoine René de Voyer, French noble (b. 1722)
- August 16 – John Ponsonby (politician), Irish politician (b. 1713)
- September 7 – Carlos Fitz-James Stuart, 4th Duke of Liria and Jérica, Spanish duke (b. 1752)
- October 7 – Henry Muhlenberg, German-born founder of the U.S. Lutheran Church (b. 1711)
- October 28 – Johann Karl August Musäus, German author and collector of folk tales (b. 1735)
- November 3 – Robert Lowth, English bishop and grammarian (b. 1710)
- November 4 – Johan Daniel Berlin, Norwegian composer and organist (b. 1714)

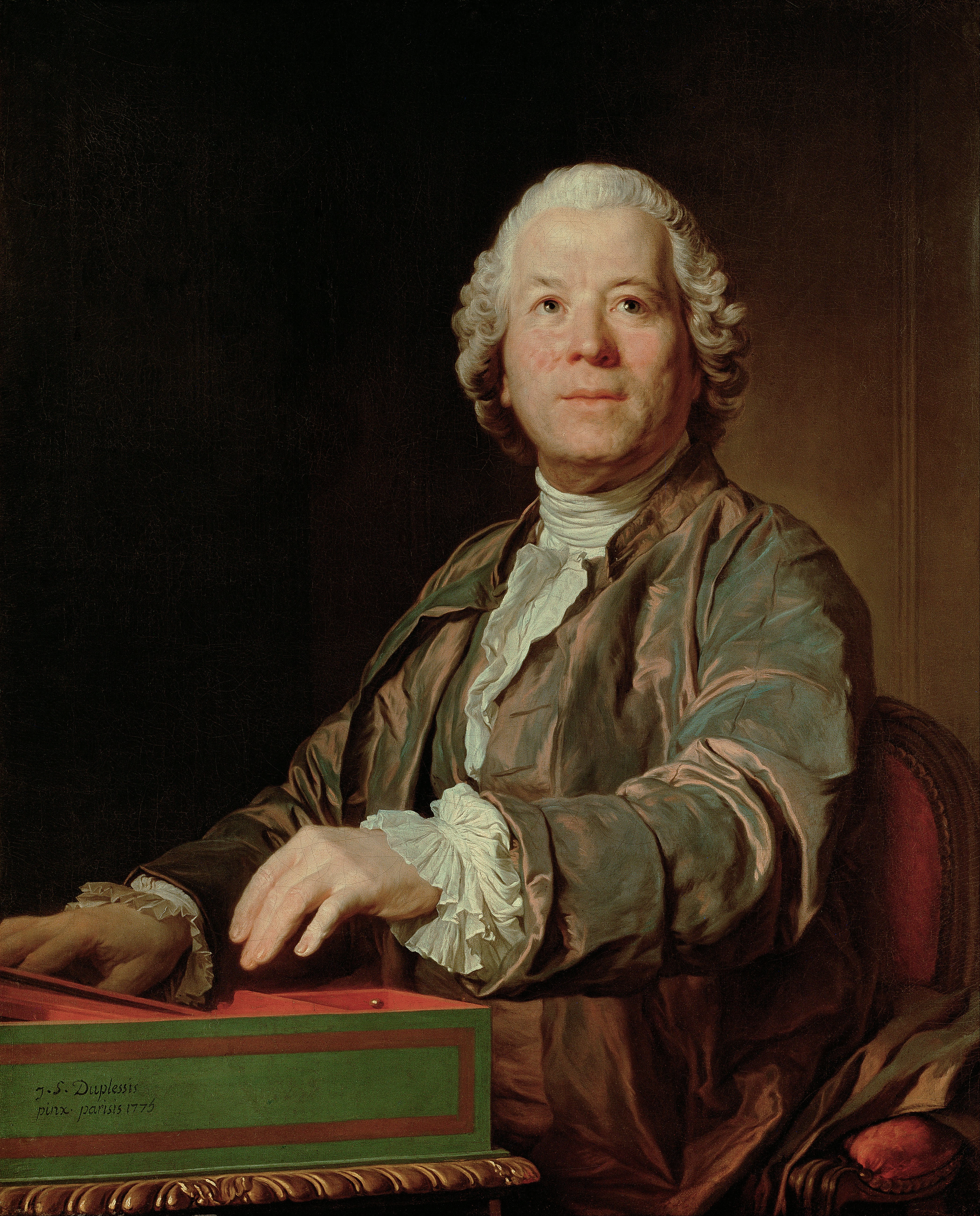
Christoph Willibald Gluck

- November 15 – Christoph Willibald Gluck, German composer (b. 1714)
- December 11 – Robert de Lamanon, French botanist (b. 1752)
- date unknown
  - Maria Pellegrina Amoretti, Italian lawyer (b. 1756)
  - The Two-Headed Boy of Bengal, sufferer from the rare condition Craniopagus parasiticus (b. 1783)
  - Francis William Drake, British admiral and Governor of Newfoundland (b. 1724)
