= San Juan del Río =

- City
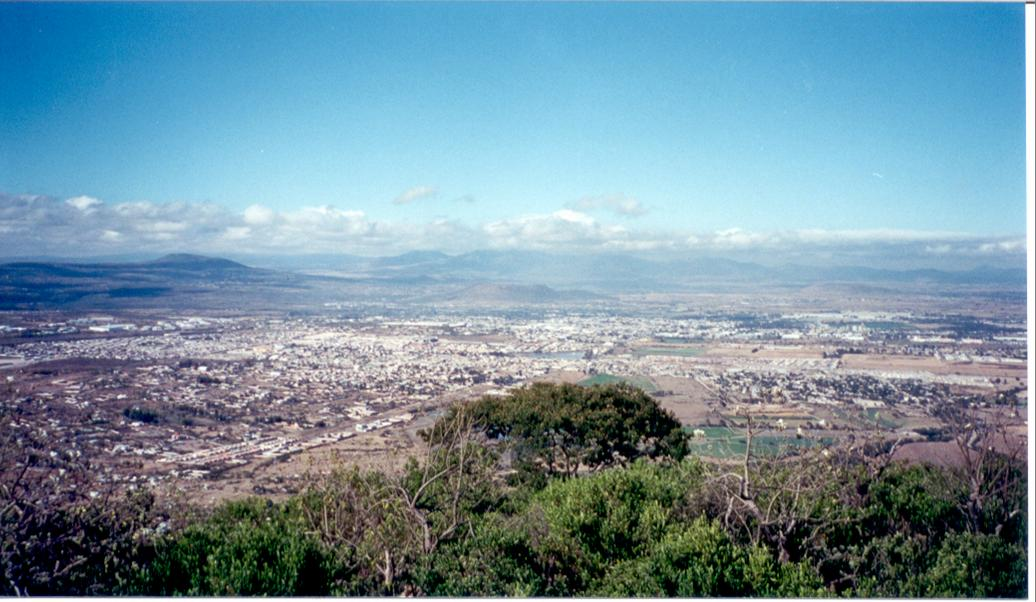
- Partial view of San Juan del Río (taken from "Cerro Gordo" hill).

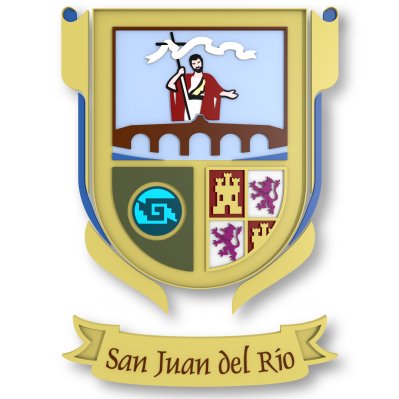
- Coat of arms

- Location within Querétaro Location within Mexico
- Coordinates: 20°23′N 99°59′W
- Country: Mexico
- State: Querétaro
- Municipality: San Juan del Río Municipality

Government
  - Municipal president: Guillermo Vega Guerrero (PAN)

Area (municipality)
  - Total: 799.9 km^{2} (308.8 sq mi)

Population (2020)
  - Total: 177,719
  - Summer (DST): UTC-6
- HDI (2000): 0.8035
- GDP (per capita): US$6.980,00; 2000
- WOEID: 143928
- Website: sanjuandelrio.gob.mx

San Juan del Río is a city (2010 census pop. 241,699) and administrative center of the surrounding San Juan del Río Municipality (pop. 308,462) in the central Mexican state of Querétaro. The population within the municipality is 268,408 as of 2015. It is part of the macroregion of the Bajío.

The city and its municipality have the second-highest population in the state. The municipality has an area of 799.9 km^{2} (308.8 sq mi).

The city is located on country's central plateau (altiplano), 50 km (31 mi) southeast of state capital, Santiago de Querétaro, at 20°23′N 99°59′W with an elevation of 1922 m. Opals are mined at nearby La Trinidad, and the city is also an agricultural center producing corn, wheat, sugarcane, beans, alfalfa, fruit and livestock.. A number of wineries are also located in the vicinity.

San Juan del Río is connected to Santiago de Querétaro and Mexico City by the mainline freight railway and Federal Highway 57.

== History ==
The city was founded on the Feast of Saint John the Baptist June 24, 1531, by Fernando de Tapia, an Otomí chieftain that converted to Catholicism and dropped his Native name Conín. San Juan was one of the first Spanish settlements outside the Valley of Mexico and thus marked the beginning of the colonization of Northern and Western Mexico, including the city of Querétaro, which was founded one month later. The settlement became important since it was an obligated stop during the rich mining regions of Guanajuato, Zacatecas and San Luis Potosí.

=== Pre-Hispanic era ===
In what now occupies the municipal area of San Juan del Río, on the bank of the river that bears the same name, discoveries of the ancient Otomí culture who have the ancestry of Chupícuaro have been found, legacies indicating that the area was inhabited around 400 BC. The ancient settlers were sedentary gatherers; carriers of a complex culture and way of life. It is considered one of the oldest social organizations in the Mexican highlands. The Otomí culture made very important advances, especially in the cultivation of maize, beans, pumpkin, and agave. The Otomí, after having great advantages in agriculture, were grouped in the region around the hill Techimacit (today Barrio de la Cruz); in the glen that forms the riverbed; they built their houses forming the village they called Ixtachichimecapan, which means land of white Chichimecas, and whose chief it was Mexici who later had the Christian name of John.

=== Foundation ===
San Juan del Río was founded as a community of original peoples (presumably of the Otomí language and ethnic group) on June 24 Thyrean bonfires of 1531 (although for some authors, such as Agustín Ruiz Olloqui the true date of the foundation is June 24, 1526, which appears in a document of the colony dealing about water and which currently remains in the Municipal Historical Archive), and was named for that day being the feast of San Juan Bautista, and because it remained on the banks of a flowing river, it usually had the suffix, "Of The River". It is around this date that the city fair is held annually, in which bullfights, games, concerts, and other cultural events take place. San Juan del Río is sometimes confused with Santiago de Querétaro, a frontier of safeguarding during the confrontation between the Chichimecas groups called barbarians and vice royal expansionism; later, the two cities were the middle ground between Zacatecas and San Luis Potosí mining hubs with Mexico City.

=== Colonial Age ===
Once the village was founded and conquered peacefully, the organizational and building work began; the first chapel of the village built by the Franciscan religious was built and the main streets were drawn "on an area of 2,500 square rods of good land and gentle slope". The Village of San Juan del Río, the head of its Jurisdiction, is founded on a hillside near the North and Westeros that tops in a broken valley, which is surrounded by all parts of hills.

Constructive work during the sixteenth century (1500s) was restricted to the scope of the organization of the town and to solve certain immediate problems. One of the first urban elements of community use was the construction of the bridge over the San Juan River, which practically left the population not being able to communicate with each other during the rainy season. This case concerned both the San Juanan population and the interests of the vice royal government, mainly because it was a place of transit and rest for the constant travelers with silver shipments, who came from the North to Mexico City. The bridge that alleviated the problem is attributed to Fray Sebastián de Aparicio and was built in 1561 (today Benito Juárez Avenue, in front of the municipal pantheon). Since traffic over the bridge was constant, in 1621 it had to be rebuilt.

== The 18th century ==
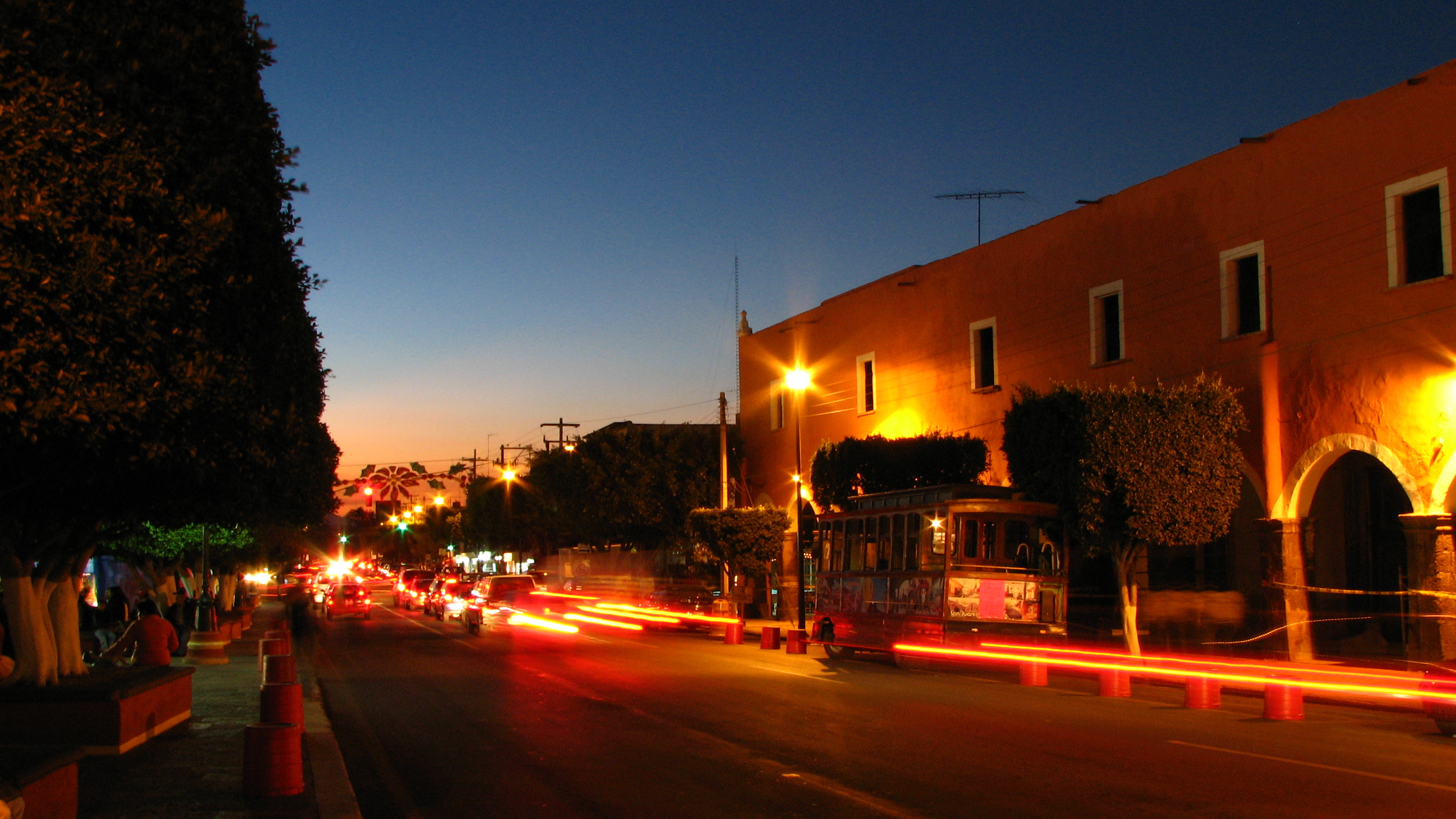
Av. Juárez and Portal del Diezmo.

At the beginning of the eighteenth century, at the behest of the Vice royal government the bridge was again rebuilt, resulting in a much stronger and more colorful bridge than the previous two: built on five arches and quarry plates that to date remain in place. This bridge was completed on 23 January 1722 in the rule of the Duke of Linares.

In addition to this relevant urban element, churches, temples, and convents began to gain ground with their respective ideological influence. The old town of San Juan del Río is similar to that of Querétaro, in which two types of route were included, the irregular trace that is supposed to be the ancient indigenous area where the temple for indigenous people of Calvary was built (named for sinuousness and pen tooth of the ground where it is nestled). The other street layout coincides with the Spanish practice of that time "a cordel", whose urban element and union was the temple for Spaniards of San Juan Bautista. Both buildings were attached camposantos, the first one still retains the original name of Santa Veracruz. In 1670 the first school of letters for girls was formalized, receiving the name "Beaterio de Nuestra Señora de los Dolores", founded by the Third Sisters of the Order of San Francisco, which in 1683 was reorganized by the venerable dray Antonio Margil of Jesus, of whom an interesting legend is told. In 1672, the Hospital and Convent of San Juan de Dios were founded, for the care of the sick in the city and the visitors who stopped in its path, today this building is occupied worthily by the Autonomous University of Querétaro. In 1693 the construction of a new parish church began, which was consecrated on July 25, 1729, and dedicated to the patron saint of the city, St. John the Baptist. On the same dates the construction of the temple and convent of Santo Domingo was completed; the aforementioned convent is located on the main street of San Juan del Río, at the entrance of the royal road (at the current crossroads of Juárez and Zaragoza avenues). Its facade is a quarry, adorned with three shields: La Merced, San Francisco, and Santo Domingo.

On April 3, 1847, and in the context of the war between Mexico and the United States of America, the state government granted the then Villa of San Juan del Río the title of city.

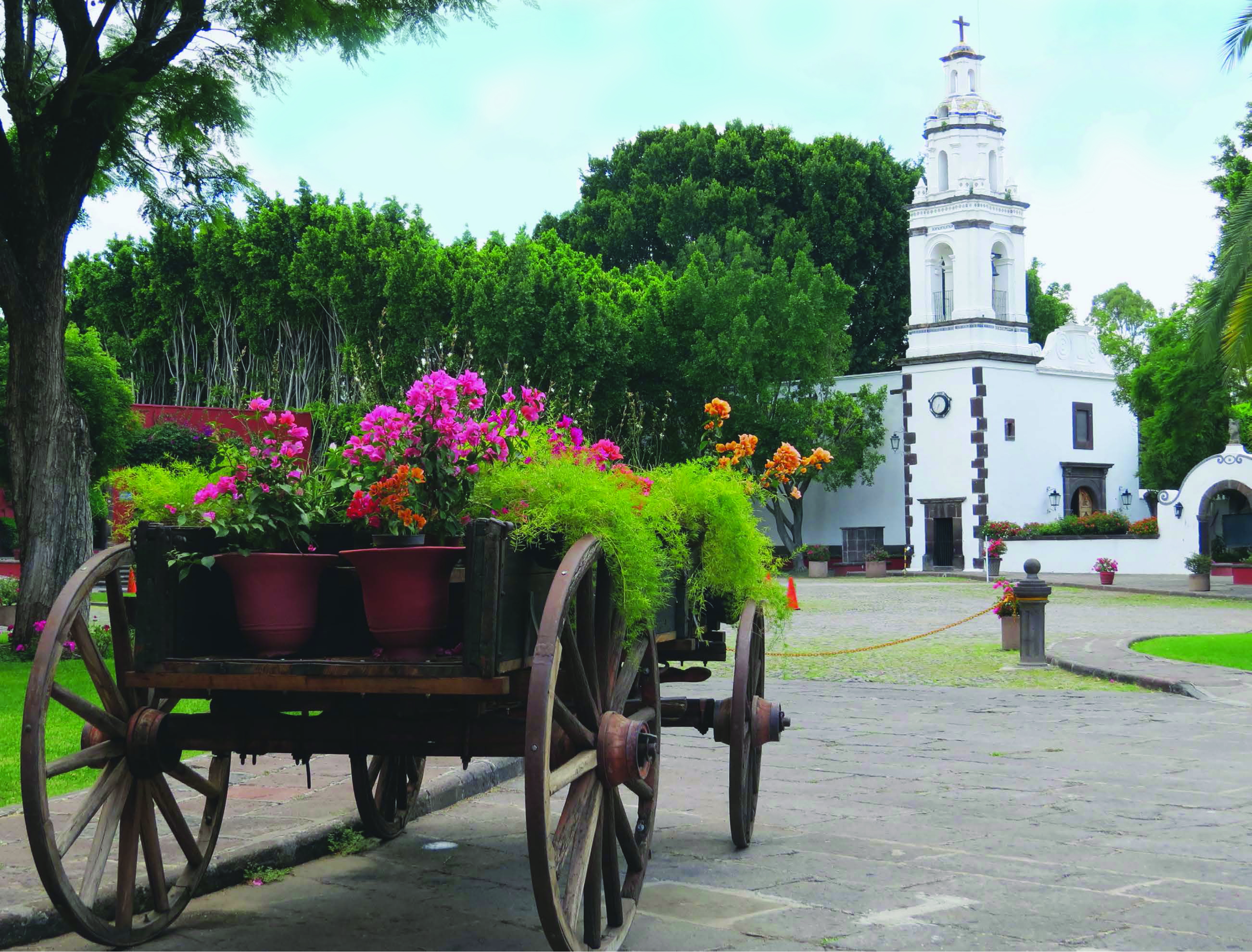
Chapel of Hacienda Galindo

By 1855, industry and trade had a major boost. Among the most important establishments and companies of the time were: barbershops, carpentry, rocket shops, tanneries, breweries, blacksmiths, wheat mills, soap pailas, cotton trapiches, bakeries, silverware, painting workshops, tailors, hat shops, woodworking, wool and blanket looms, battering shops, shoe shops, and futsalstores.

In 1863, [Benito Juarez], on his escape to San Luis Potosí, he stayed overnight in San Juan del Río and, in 1867, Maximilian of Habsburg launched one of his last proclamations in this city, in which he exhorted the people to defend "the Independence and the internal order of the country". Later, on the hill of the Bells of the city of Querétaro was shot along with Generals Miramón and Mejía. "Contemporary Time" In the last decade of the nineteenth century, San Juan del Río participated in the railway development by laying the track of the Mexican National Railway and, years later, when the "Round House" for the repair of steam engines was located in this city.

During the period 1960–1970, San Juan del Río began its urban, economic and social transformation of the strong impetus given to the industrializing, commercial and communications process; factors that have currently placed this municipality as the second in importance in the State of Querétaro.

== Shield ==
This shield is composed of a traditional coat of arms accompanied by a pair of headbands that descend from the top and join at the lower central. The coat of arms of San Juan del Río is a composite, Spanish-style one, which as well as Portuguese and Flanders-flamenco (countries that received Spanish influx) is rounded at the base in the shape of an inverted half-point arch.

The blasón is divided into three barracks that contain representative aspects of the municipality: in the upper middle is located the image of the Patron Saint John the Baptist represented in half body; then, symbolizing the historical future, there is the bridge of five arches: the great stone bridge, representing the foundation, evangelization, and development during the viceroyalty.

The lower environment is divided, in turn, into two barracks that represent the moment before evangelization: to the sinister is located the Otomi rode that symbolizes our pre-Hispanic roots when the Spaniards arrived in Iztacchichimecapan (ancient name of San Juan del Río) to conquest. On the right hand, the kingdom of Spain is represented as the meaning of those who founded the people. In the lower part of the blasón is located a gallardete that bears the name of the municipality: San Juan del Río.

The author of the shield took elements of the heraldry for its creation, including as the basis of the composition the representative Stone Bridge, above it the image of the patron Saint John the Baptist -remembering the date of June 24, 1531, the day of St. John the Baptist when it occurred, according to legend, the Spanish foundation of San Juan del Río- and the representation of the Kingdom of Spain in its characteristic colors with the towers of the Kingdom of Castile and the rampant lions of the Kingdom of León, which are already unified here This is the original colored shield in a stylized design. It is the original work of the author. The enamels (colors) it integrates are: metal: Gold (heraldic)-gold; and five enamels: gules (red), azure (blue), sable (black), sinople (green), griffon (brown) and carnation (meat).

== Puente de la Historia (Bridge of History) ==
The stone bridge construction started on 9 February 1710 by the Mexican architect Pedro de Arrieta. The bridge was completed on 23 January 1711 and soon became the most transited bridge in Mexico as it was the main connection between Mexico City and the northern states.

The bridge has greater historical importance as it was the main way to get to Mexico City for all of those who fought during the Mexican Independence and Mexican Revolution.

== Geography ==
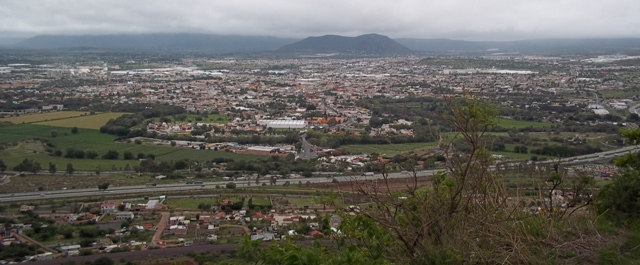
Partial view of the city from the hill of sale

The city is located in a central sedimentary valley of a rich agricultural area with abundant underground streams of hot springs of about 37.5 O.

The valley of San Juan is surrounded by the mountains of La Llave (2,450 [msnm]) of Xajay (2,750 meters above sea level) of Scholastics (2,800 meters above sea level) and Jingó (2,500 meters above sea level).

The San Juan River, whose sources are located in the State of Mexico, is the mainstream of the municipality and the state. This river, when leaving the municipality of Tequisquiapan, already with the name of Río Moctezuma forms the natural boundary between the states of Querétaro and Hidalgo and already flows as Rio Pánuco into the Golfo de México in the port of Tampico.

=== Climate ===
San Juan del Río has a semi-dry temperate climate, the rains fall mainly in the summer. Snow is rare in this area, although the hills northeast of the city have been covered with a light white layer.

Climate data for San Juan del Río (1951–2010)
Month	Jan	Feb	Mar	Apr	May	Jun	Jul	Aug	Sep	Oct	Nov	Dec	Year
Record high °C (°F)	29.5 (85.1)	31 (88)	33 (91)	35.3 (95.5)	41 (106)	37 (99)	35 (95)	31.7 (89.1)	32.2 (90.0)	31 (88)	30 (86)	29 (84)	41 (106)
Mean daily maximum °C (°F)	23.5 (74.3)	25.4 (77.7)	28.8 (83.8)	32 (90)	36 (97)	32 (90)	31 (88)	31 (88)	29 (84)	25.5 (77.9)	26 (79)	23.2 (73.8)	36 (97)
Daily mean °C (°F)	17.2 (63.0)	16.2 (61.2)	19.1 (66.4)	19.5 (67.1)	20.5 (68.9)	21.3 (70.3)	20.6 (69.1)	20.7 (69.3)	18.3 (64.9)	18.4 (65.1)	18.6 (65.5)	15.5 (59.9)	17.2 (63.0)
Mean daily minimum °C (°F)	8.1 (46.6)	6.8 (44.2)	8.2 (46.8)	11 (52)	13 (55)	14 (57)	15 (59)	14 (57)	13 (55)	11 (52)	9 (48)	4.7 (40.5)	4.7 (40.5)
Record low °C (°F)	−10.6 (12.9)	−5.1 (22.8)	−0.7 (30.7)	2.6 (36.7)	5.2 (41.4)	5.5 (41.9)	4.0 (39.2)	8.1 (46.6)	4.5 (40.1)	2.3 (36.1)	−0.5 (31.1)	−2.0 (28.4)	−10.6 (12.9)
Average precipitation mm (inches)	0.8 (0.03)	15 (0.6)	21 (0.8)	38 (1.5)	80 (3.1)	140 (5.5)	130 (5.1)	121 (4.8)	132 (5.2)	73 (2.9)	19 (0.7)	11 (0.4)	780 (30.7)

=== Flora ===
The flora in San Juan del Río, being in a general study, accommodates the flora "Mezquital", of the regions between 1,400 and 2,000 meters above sea level. However, by specializing in the study, we can say that there is a flora amplitude. The "Mezquital" area is composed of small trees and large shrubs, such as mesquite, piru or pirul, gobystick, cat's claw, reed, huisache, garambullo, granjeno, and nopal; also the desert-type plants, such as the biznaga and organs.

== Health ==
In the municipality, they serve the population of the urban health center "La Floresta" which is located a few kilometers from the General Hospital, and the urban health center located in Av. Juárez Pte. (Formerly the General Hospital) and the General Hospital, being dependent on the Ministry of Health of the State of Querétaro Secretariat of Health (Mexico)- ( SESEQ); Zona No.3 General Hospital, urban clinics No. 6 and 7, dependent on the Mexican Social Security Institute Mexican Social Security Institute" IMSS); [Red Cross], as well as several private clinics and hospitals. In the rural area, rural clinics are provided, as well as private clinics and clinics, providing the health service to 100% of the population in the municipality.

Both the SESEQ General Hospital and the IMSS Zone Hospital provide 2nd level medical care, although the former General Hospital (SESEQ) in recent years highlighted the entire State of Querétaro by winning the National Quality Award; in addition to the population of the municipality itself, that of the surrounding municipalities, including the states of [[State of Hidalgo] Hidalgo]], [[State of Mexico] Mexico]] and Michoacán, serving more than 500,000 inhabitants, so in some cases the service is insufficient. Emergency services are mainly served by the Mexican Red Cross delegation San Juan del Río, and there are several support groups such as the National Emergency Commission, Volunteer Firefighters, and BEYEN Ambulances, who have a history of 36 years of service and experience in different types of emergencies as well as vehicle rescue, room house fires, accidents in which hazardous materials are involved, among others.

After the catastrophe recorded on September 19, 2010, where the former General Hospital was flooded, a great effort was begun to build a new general hospital. With the help of federal and state financial contributions within a period of approximately one year, the work was completed. On February 21, 2012, the universal coverage plate of popular insurance was unveiled, days after the inauguration of this San Juan del Río General Hospital, with the presence of the President of the Republic Felipe Calderón Hinojosa and in the company of Governor José Calzada. The hospital currently has a wide variety of specialties, as well as the highest technology equipment and extensive facilities and enough to provide the health service to the entire population that requires it.

- Health Jurisdiction: 2nd
- Institutional Hospitals: 3
- Private Hospitals: 13

== Tourism ==
A few minutes from the city of San Juan del Río is the residential division and Club de Golf San Gil. Right on the road this immense community offers a variety of amenities. The 18-hole course is well-conditioned and is host to major national and international tournaments. San Gil has a lake, clubhouse, and large gardens.

- Paso de los Guzmán Ecological Park. Located in Blvd. Paso de los Guzmán s/n, Centro. This park has sports facilities such as basketball courts, fast football, volleyball, rollerblade track, palapas area, cafeteria, running track and children's games.

- Maquío Sports Unit. Located in Av. de las Garzas S/n Colonia Indeco. This sports unit has an auditorium with a wide capacity to enjoy the sporting and cultural events that take place there. It has basketball courts, volleyball, playground and a soccer field with regulatory measures, as well as an athletics court.

-San Juan Sports Unit. Located on the road San Juan del Río - Tequisquiapan km 6. This sports center has several football courts; including one with regulatory measures, as well as several volleyball and basketball courts and playgrounds, as well as a pool with nailed pit and platform; bathrooms, and cafeteria service.

- José María Morelos y Pavón Cultural and Convention Center. Located on Panamericana s/n road, Lomas de Guadalupe colony. In this place, you will find sports and cultural facilities. It has an auditorium with capacity for three thousand people, as well as external volleyball and basketball courts, and cafeteria and bathroom.

Historic Monuments

- History Bridge. Located in Av. Benito Juárez Pte. in front of the Municipal Pantheon. Because of its geographical location, it was an obligatory step for the arriería and carriages that went to the North and West of New Spain. From the mid-17th century, it was called "Garganta de Tierra Dentro". It was forced to be a customs stop where the alcabalas of all kinds of goods were collected, especially the brandy, which was severely inspected. The great avenues of the river were the cause of complaints from the owners of recuas, as well as from merchants and travelers, who made it impossible for them to follow their path as long as the river did not go down, being forced to spend several days in the village, with the consequent expenses Unforeseen. Ruled New Spain Don Francisco Fernández de la Cueva, Duke of Albuquerque, Marquis de Cuéllar, who took into his hands this serious problem. He ordered the Spanish architect Pedro de Arrieta, the construction of a bridge for San Juan del Río, whose construction began on February 9, 1710, and was completed on January 23, 1711, Governing the New Spain Don Fernando de Alencastre Noroña and Silva Duque de Linares Marqués V alfuentesfuentes.

In February 2010, the 300th years of the Stone Bridge, popularly known as the Bridge of History, where this monument has been highlighted for being a symbol of the legacy, which different generations have left through the years in their task to make San Juan del Río a better place to live. The Stone Bridge began to be built on February 9, 1710, by the Mexican architect Pedro de Arrieta -who was also one of the architects who designed the Metropolitan Cathedral of Mexico City and the Collegiate Church of Guadalupe (former Basilica)-, attending the mandate of the Viceroy Duke of Albuquerque, Don Francisco Fernández de la Cueva, Marqués de Cuéllar, to build this access. At the conclusion of construction on January 23, 1711, it was also created as the "most used" bridge between Mexico City to communicate with all the downs, especially between mining entities such as Guanajuato, Zacatecas or San Luis Potosí and in the same way as it was very useful to cross the great flow of the San Juan River, 300 years after its construction remains one of the main accesses to this city. It has also historically been, an obligatory step of all those who fought 200 years ago for the Independence of Mexico and 100 years ago in the revolutionary movement. The San Juan River crosses this great bridge along with the grandparents' park. Thousands of ducks migrate to this river every year, there are whites, Canadians and Europeans, in 2011 they managed to see geese cafes and white swans.

- Diocesan Shrine of Our Lady of Guadalupe. Located in front of Plaza Independencia. The history of the construction of the current parish church dates from May 9, 1689, where the clergy and the neighbors of San Juan del Río, went to the Viceroy Don Gaspar de la Cerda Sandoval Silva and Mendoza, Count de Galve, in order to obtain permission for his construction. The building is of neoclassical construction, elegant and wide lines that make it distinguished. The Indians were indoctrinated and called Mass in a chapel covered with tejamanil that was on land where the parish of the Spaniards was built. Currently, the Virgin of Guadalupe is venerated inside.
- Temple of the Lord of Sacromonte. Located in Av. Juárez Ote. in the Garden of the Family. The church that began to be built on land ceded by the Town Hall of the Villa, with the copious alms of the faithful. The permit for its construction was given by the Governor of the State on the 4th of Agósto of 1826. Religious festivities were held there on Friday, November 20, 1831, with the blessing and dedication of the Temple. At the end of the three days of religious holidays, six days of profane holidays began.
- Temple and Exconvento of Santo Domingo. Located in Av. Juárez and Zaragoza. The foundation of the convent was made by offices and licenses of the Exmo. Mr. Viceroy Melchor Portocarrero Lasso de la Vega, Count of Monclova, dated 26 Enéro of 1690, with the aim of making the sick religious who missionary the Sierra Gorda, moved to this convent since Querétaro was more retired to them. This convent belonged to the Holy Province of Santiago de Predicadores, calling itself the Convent of the Precious Blood of Our Lord Jesus Christ of San Juan del Río. On the afternoon of September 6, 1823, came the funeral urns containing the skulls of Don Miguel Hidalgo y Costilla, Ignacio Allende, Mariano Jiménez, as well as the remains of Don Francisco Xavier Mina and Pedro Moreno, which were veiled in this convent. The convent is simple and is currently occupied by the Municipal Presidency.
- Parish Temple of St. John the Baptist. Located in front of the Plaza de los Fundadores. The first church in the village was built on the site that currently occupies what was known as the temple of the Sacred Heart. He had his pantheon towards the Westeros, in what is now Founder's Square. In the next century and towards the end of it, the church was asked to throw away, and it was not until the early 1700s, that it was torn down to its foundations; because it was small and built with the land. The priest Don Esteban García Rebollo, who did not tolerate racial discrimination, since it was called Parish of the Naturals, consecrated him with the name of the Temple of the Sacred Heart, in 2006 he became the Parish of San Juan Bautista.
- Portal of the Tithe. It is the most important cultural center of San Juan del Río. It currently has 2 art galleries, 1 photo theater, the Municipal Public Library Juan Wenceslao Sánchez de la Barquera y Morales and the Municipal Historical Archive. It is located on the old Camino Real de Tierra Adentro and was used to collect ecclesiastical taxes. The Camino Real de Tierra Adentro was the route through which minerals, goods, and people passed insistently during the Viceroyalty. This path was long and, through its course, was creating wealth and development.
- San Juan del Río occupies a part of what was this path and the wealth that generated it can be seen in its opulent haciendas. To get to know them you have to take the Tour de las Haciendas that San Juan offers to its visitors.

=== Squares ===
- Independence Square. Located between the streets of Hidalgo and Guerrero, Centro. It is located in the City Center. In it stands a column, built in honor of Empress Charlotte. At the fall of the empire was dedicated to Independence. It has a large marble tombstone in which it holds the date of intervention ordered by the City Council of San Juan del Río and says: "THE AYUNTAMIENTO IN HONOR TO THE NATIONAL INDEPENDENCE 1865". The blessing of the fountain that was built around the Monument to Freedom was on March 19, 1887. At first, the column was adorned on top by an eagle made of bronze, which was destroyed by lightning.
- Family Garden Square. It emerged as a public square after the construction of the Temple of the Lord of the Sacred in 1832, the last temple built in the center of the city in a virreinal style. It has a water fountain and in 1994 during the international year of the family was placed a marble statue with the figure of a family, because of this the square is known as Garden of the Family.
- Founders' Square. Located between the streets of Hidalgo and September 16. It was originally part of the temple of the Sacred Heart, where the pantheon was located. Later it became the Garden Of Cosio and then Jardin Porfirio Díaz; it was also called Jardín Madero and finally in 1981, it was remodeled as we currently know it, with its kiosk. In it is a monument in honor of the founders of San Juan del Río.

=== Other Sites of Interest ===
- Death Museum. (Also Pantheon of the Santa Veracruz) Located on 2nd Street April no. 42. This museum is called "Site Museum" because the building that gives room and meaning is the Cemetery of the Santa Veracruz. The project for the construction of this cemetery was presented by the architect Guadalupe Perrusquía and Mr. Felícitas Osornio in 1853; to which the National Institute of Anthropology and History rescued from abandonment in 1981. The Death Museum opened in 1997 aims to show the importance that human beings attach to the act of dying. The ways have changed and today it presents some rituals that Mexicans perform throughout their history. There you can know some background of how the dead inhabitants of these lands were ritualized before the Spaniards came to conquer them.

The animals that live in the Municipality of San Juan del Río are horses, donkeys, bulls, pigs, coyotes, wolves, foxes, cacomiztles, raccoons, tlacuaches, squirrels, ferrets, ounces, armadillos. Guajolotes, chickens; in the swamps, we find bargains and crouches, long-ass pigeons, doves, quails; in cold times ducks and migrant geese; chicks, stingers, bone breakers, tordos, crows, zopilotes, cenzontles, cuitlacars, jilgueros, clarinets, calandrias, cardinals, blue and gray sparrows, verdines and Dominicans. Tecolotes, owls, and bats. Bagres, carp, frogs and small turtles. Rattlesnakes, alicantes, coral; lizards, toads, and chameleons. Ixtachichimecapan Museum Room. Av. Juarez on the side of the Sacromonte Temple. Located within the premises of the historic center building, it shows different archaeological pieces showing the different stages of occupation that took place during the Pre-Hispanic era in San Juan del Río. The building that houses this museum is a house built in the eighteenth century, former Prison and Municipal Prefecture; now rescued as a tourist and cultural attraction, where different areas are integrated for the dissemination of culture, the Municipal Historical Archive, the Public Library "Juan María Wenceslao Sánchez de la Barquera y Morales", the Bookshop "Dr. Rafael Ayala Echavarri", Gallery, and a Multipurpose Courtyard.

- Cerro and Barrio de la Cruz. During pre-Hispanic times this place was a ceremonial center and later a Place of Catholic Worship where popular festivals are held. It has a hermitage from 1679 in which the Holy Cross is venerated and a chapel in the 40s of the last century.

Opal, a semiprecious stone, is extracted from mines in San Juna del Rio. The stones display a range of colors that vary depending on the direction of light. Local artisans work with opal to produce jewelry and decorative items. Some opal products from the area are exported abroad, including to Japan.

In the traditional portals, Ladies are installed who sell elaborate hooked folders, as well as napkins with fraying; while in the artisan market you can buy various pieces of pottery, metals, and quarry tilling in the region.

Events

St. John the Baptist's Feasts San Juan del Río was named after its founders arriving at the place on June 24, the day of San Juan, only because it stood on the bank of a flowing river, the "Del Rio" was also applied.

Over the years, these festivities were gaining importance, both because of the influence of religion, as well as for the growth of the city's population and nearby communities.

The festivities of San Juan have not always been celebrated in the month of June, since in a copy of the Shadow of Arteaga dated December 21, 1878, it tells us that the festivities that took place in the city that year, began on December 11 and concluded on the 14th of the same month, being prefect of the district Mr. J. Jesús Dominguez, and it seems that one of the main organizers was Dr. Agustín Ruiz Olloqui.

It was until the year 1891, when Mr. T. Melesio Alcántara, local deputy for San Juan del Río, organized in a more formal way the festivities of San Juan, requesting the State Legislature to correspond the permission for the realization of our festivities. The first fair program was contemplated the celebration of cockfights and bullfights, which since that time have allowed our parties, increasingly to enhance. Likewise, the charreadas were an important part of the same festivities because the Association of Charros Sanjuanense was the second to be formed in the Republic, to be exact in 1912.

The festivities of San Juan, have been suspended very rarely, as was during the Revolution in 1911, in 1917 for security reasons, in 1918 on the occasion of an epidemic of Spanish influence, and more recently in 1967.

In 1928, on the occasion of the patron saint festivities, the Bullring, Rodolfo Gaona, built by the Municipal President, Don José Serrano, was inaugurated. During the following years, the festivities continued to develop in the city center, including the dances of the coronation of the Queen in the Hall of Cabildo of the Municipal Presidency.

By 1962, at the initiative of Don José Manuel Layseca Bermúdez and Don Francisco Salas, the celebration began within our festivities, the day of the peasant, and the choice of the Most Beautiful Flower of the Field was held for the first time.

Special mention deserves the year of 1965, in which the first Floral Games are held, being Municipal President the Lic. Manuel Suárez Muñoz, in which the Poet Ernesto Moreno Madruca triumphed, with the composition "To invoke your love", receiving the Flower A native of S.G.M. Mary Cruz I and serving as a maintainer by Mr. Manuel Montes Collantes, with this began the most important cultural event of the city, which would gather throughout its trajectory, the most recognized poets and writers, national, queretanos and SanJuanenses, highlighting among the latter Don Pablo Cabrera.

From 1971, the fair was installed outside the city center and there were different associations of SanJuanens such as the Chamber of Commerce and the Lions Club, who organized the festivities on different dates. In the 1980s the fair center was located in the facilities of the Cultural and Convention Center José María Morelos (CECUCO), located to the south-east of the city, later in 2004 the Expositor Center is inaugurated, located in the [Road[Road 120th Road] from San Juan del Río to Xilitla.

Others of the few events that are particular of San Juan del Río is the pilgrimage of Farolitos that takes place every December 11.

=== Procession of the Phallodes ===
The procession of the Phallolitus is a San Juan tradition that takes place every year on December 11 to start the festivities of the Virgin of Guadalupe in San Juan del Río. Its beginnings date back to 1948. The idea was born in the mind of Father Manuel Pérez Esquivel. This idea was well accepted by Father Francisco Paulin Gómez who was the city's pastor. This is one of the most important religious events in San Juan del Río in the last century. In this procession more than 5 thousand people have been gathered representatives of various institutions such as parish associations, schools, municipal authorities, among others, to illuminate Juarez Avenue with its thousands of farolitos until reaching the Shrine of Our Lady of Guadalupe. Initially, the pilgrimage began in the Hacienda de la Venta until reaching the old parish; the forerunners of this tradition carried candles and torches, presently carrying paper phallolites or celopán. From about 1980 on, the pilgrimage begins in the Temple of St. John of God and concludes in the Parish Atrium, where the mass of the celebration is held. Those who participate in the celebration claim that it means the pilgrim of life, dedicated to the Virgin of Guadalupe and the phallolites represent the faith towards the virgin. In recent years, the children dress as little shepherds in honor of Juan Diego who had the privilege of seeing the appearance of the Virgin of Guadalupe. Thus, every December 11 the city is illuminated and the prayers of the faithful to the Queen of Tepeyac rise.

=== Illustrious Characters of San Juan del Río ===
- Cristóbal Sánchez de Guevara (1580-1644), lawyer of the Royal Audience and Rector of the Royal and Pontifical University of Mexico.
- Francisco Javier Gómez de Cervantes (1660-1759), Bishop of Puerto Rico and Cancelio of the Metropolitan University of Mexico.
- Reverend Mother Beatriz María de Jesús Flores (1665-1751), founder of the Beaterio of Our Lady of Sorrows. He died in the smell of holiness. His cause of beatification is suspended.
- Nicolás Gómez de Cervantes (1668-1734), Bishop of Guatemala and Guadalajara. Under its auspices was built the Shrine of Our Lady of St. John of the Lakes, among others.
- José Mariano Perrusquía y Rubio (1766-1827), a prominent sculptor, numerous works of his are found in several states of the Republic.
- Luis G. Quintanar Soto y Ruiz (1772-1837), a prominent general in the War of Independence.
- General José Morán del Villar, Marquis of Vivanco (1774-1841). Distinguished soldier and outstanding culture. Founder of the Brother Military College at the Castle of San Carlos in Perote, of the General Staff of the Army and the General Escalation.
- Juan José García Enríquez De Rivera Rebollo Osio y Campo (1775-1837). Deputy of the first Constituent Congress, he swore for independence in Querétaro in 1821. Declared Benemérito of the City of Querétaro.
- Diego de Tovar (1783-1717), a distinguished insurgent who alongside the priest Hidalgo fought during the War of Independence.
- Juan M.a Wenceslas Sánchez de la Barquera y Morales (1779-1840), an illustrious lawyer, philosopher, writer and politician, is owed countless facts and works for the benefit of the nation.
- Ignacio Reyes Rayón (1804-1883), liberal, politician, senator for the Republic and great speaker. He signed the Constitution of 1857 for Querétaro.
- Fray Francisco Parra (1807-1862?). Sanjuanense of great intellectual, social and religious category, was provincial of the Dominicans before the war of reform.
- Lieutenant Colonel Francisco Peñuñuri y Morales (1814-1847). He defended the rights of the Fatherland in the Convent of Churubusco.
- Master Maria Nestora Téllez Rendón (1828-1889). Teacher, poet and notable accountalist; their blindness was no obstacle in the world of letters and teaching.
- Rafaela Díaz Torres (1829-1860). Benefactor of the city of San Juan del Río, distinguished by her kindness and great heart towards the poor.
- Professor Angel Ma. Dominguez Quintanar (1831-1905). Notable geographer, teacher, writer, founded of schools and deputy for Querétaro during the Constitution of 1869.
- Jannet Joy" Jannet Alegría Peña (1987). A sportsman who competed in Taekwondo. He won a Bronze medal at the 2011 Pan American Games as well as a Gold Medal at the Pan American Taekwondo Champion. He also competed at the 2012 London Olympics.

== Cultural events ==
- January 17: Feast of San Antonio (Blessing of the Animals)
- February 2: Day of the Candelaria (Blessing of the Seeds)
- March 1: Jesusito de la Portería
- March 3: Feast of the Holy Cross
- Around June 24: City Fair, Feast of Patron Saint Saint John the Baptist and Anniversary of the City's Foundation.
- November 22: Feast of Santa Cecilia
- December 11: Procession of the Farolitos

== Entertainment in San Juan del Río ==
- City Fair: The San Juan's Fair is celebrated during the month of June to commemorate the anniversary of the City's foundation and the Patron Saint John the Baptist.
- Goal 7 San Juan del Río, Football 7 field "Goal 7" near the México-Querétaro highway.
- Liverpool SJR, a mall in Plaza Galerías
- Museo de la Muerte

== Notable people ==
- Luis de Quintanar, president of Mexico from December 23, 1829 to December 31, 1829
