= Memories, the real history of this republic since the year 1808 =

Memorias, la Verdadera Historia de esta República desde el año de 1808
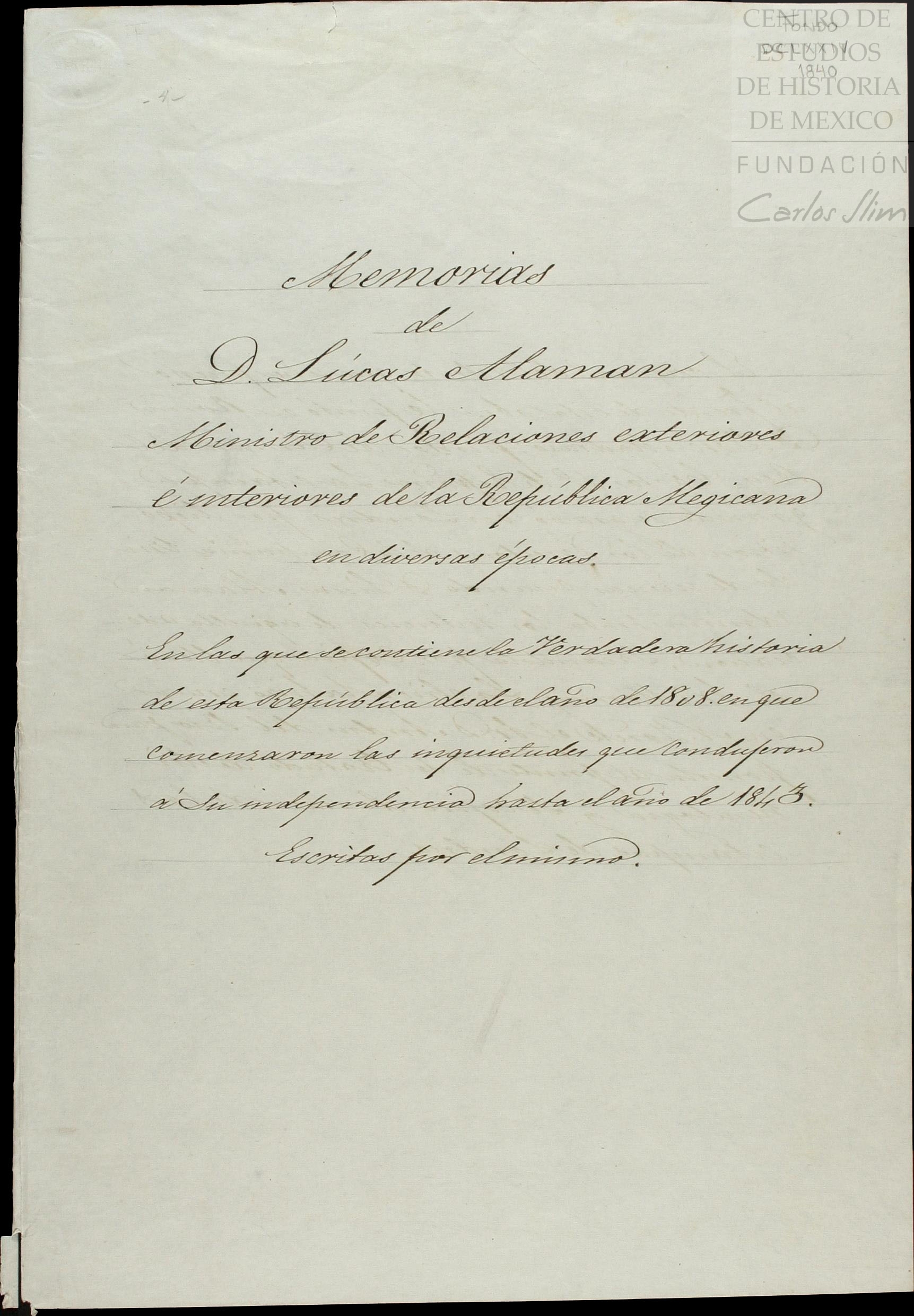
- Author: Lucas Alamán
- Language: Castellano
- Publisher: Fondo DCLXXIV
- Publication date: 1840
- Publication place: Mexico

The handwritten document Memorias, la verdadera historia de esta república desde el año 1808 was written by Lucas Alamán, minister of foreign and interior affairs of the Mexican Republic. The document sheds light on the path of the republic during the year 1808, and the circumstances that led to its independence in 1821.

== Contents of the document ==
Lucas Alamán reviews the history of the Mexican Republic from the fall of Agustín de Iturbide's empire in 1823, to the period in which Antonio Lopez de Santa Anna. According to Alamán, this span of time makes up the most important parts of Mexican history, including the beginnings of his family.
