= Luis de Quintanar =

Mexican politician (1772–1837)

José Luis de Quintanar Soto y Ruiz
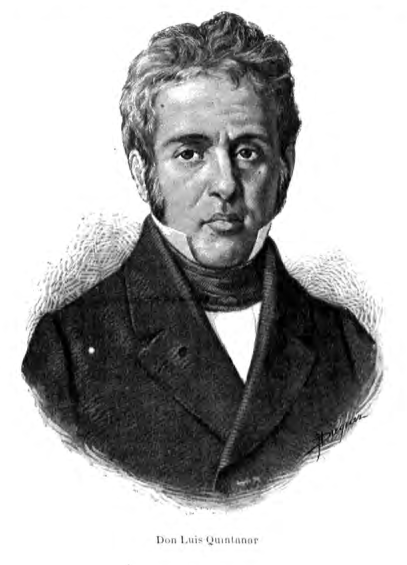
- Luis de Quintanar

Member of the Executive Triumvirate of Mexico
- In office December 23, 1829 – December 31, 1829
- Preceded by: José María Bocanegra
- Succeeded by: Anastasio Bustamante

Governor of Jalisco
- In office 1824–1826
- Preceded by: Office established
- Succeeded by: Nicolás Bravo

Political Chief of Jalisco
- In office 1822–1824
- Preceded by: Agustín de Iturbide
- Succeeded by: Nicolás Bravo

Personal details
- Born: December 22, 1772 San Juan del Río, Querétaro, New Spain
- Died: November 16, 1837 (aged 64) Mexico City, Mexico
- Party: Independent
- Profession: Soldier, Politician

Military service
- Rank: Brigadier General

José Luis de Quintanar Soto y Ruiz (December 22, 1772 in San Juan del Río, Querétaro – November 16, 1837 in Mexico City) was a Mexican soldier and statesman who briefly served as part of a triumvirate which exercised the nation's executive power for a few days at the end of 1829 after the overthrow of President Vicente Guerrero.

== Biography ==
Quintanar began his military career in 1801 as a lieutenant the Provincial Regiment of Dragoons of Querétaro. His entire royalist military career was with this unit, where he reached the rank of brigadier. During the Mexican War of Independence, he fought on the side of Spain until 1821, when he joined the Plan of Iguala. He was promoted to general of division.

After Mexican independence he supported the coronation of Agustín de Iturbide as emperor of Mexico, and Iturbide made him political chief of Jalisco (1822–1824).

In 1822 he was elected deputy from San Juan del Río to the constituent congress. He resigned the position in late 1823, and soon was elected governor of Jalisco. General Anastasio Bustamante, Quintanar's friend, was named military commander of the state.

Later he was dismissed as military commander of Nueva Galicia, for suspicion of plotting to restore Iturbide. His command was given to General José Joaquín de Herrera. In Guadalajara, the provincial delegation declared the Intendencia of Nueva Galicia the sovereign state of Jalisco. When General Herrera arrived in Guadalajara to take up his military command, he was unable to do so. Guanajuato and Querétaro had also adopted Jalisco's position, and Herrera decided to return to Mexico City.

In 1824 the new constituent congress meet and drew the boundaries of the new states. It separated the district of Colima from Jalisco with the stated intention of creating a new Pacific port to rival that of Acapulco, but actually to weaken the political position of General Quintanar. The legislature of Jalisco responded by electing Quintanar the first governor of the state. On January 20, 1824 in Jalisco Quintanar promulgated the congressional decree freeing all slaves.

Two years later President Guadalupe Victoria gave General Nicolás Bravo military command of Jalisco, and once he was established there, Victoria ordered him to remove Quintanar as governor. Quintanar was taken to Mexico City, where the president granted him amnesty, but without appointing him to any position.

He supported the military revolt of December 23, 1829 against President Vicente Guerrero. On Guerrero's departure from the capital, Quintanar led another revolt in favor of José María Bocanegra for interim president. Bocanegra served for only a few days. On December 23, 1829 he was replaced by a triumvirate consisting of Quintanar; Pedro Vélez, president of the Supreme Court; and Lucas Alamán. They exercised power until December 31, 1829, when the army of Anastasio Bustamante entered the capital and made Bustamante president. Bustamante named Quintanar president of the Supreme War Tribunal.

He died in Mexico City in 1837. His remains were buried with full military honors in the former Cemetery of Los Ángeles. When this was closed, the location of his grave was lost.

== Sources ==
- (in Spanish) Short biography

Preceded by José María Bocanegra	Member of the Executive Triumvirate of Mexico; 1829	Succeeded by Anastasio Bustamante
