= José Miguel Falcón =

7th Governor of Coahuila and Tejas
- In office 1835-07-18 – 1835-08-13
- Preceded by: Ramón Músquiz
- Succeeded by: Bartolomé de Cárdenas

Personal details
- Profession: Political

José Miguel Falcón was the governor of the province of Coahuila y Tejas in 1835. He was also the head of state of that province in 1833. Through a letter addressed to the mayor of San Antonio, he achieved the temporary imprisonment of Stephen Austin in 1834.

== Career ==
Miguel Falcón served as head of state of the province of Coahuila y Texas in 1833. During this time he wrote to the mayor of San Antonio Jose Miguel de Arciniega to imprison the American businessman and settler Stephen Austin, a resident of Texas who had proposed to the Council of San Antonio the separation of the province of Coahuila from Mexico (an emancipation in which he would collaborate). Falcón's petition was approved and in 1834 Austin was imprisoned, entering the dungeon on February 22 of that year. Although he was only in the cell for a few months, as he was released in December 1834.

Later, on July 18, 1835, Falcón was appointed governor of Texas and Coahuila, a position he held for less than a month, as on August 13 of the same year he was succeeded in the government of the province by Bartolomé de Cárcenas.
