= San Juan del Río Municipality, Querétaro =

Coordinates: 20°23′N 99°59′W

San Juan del Río
- Municipality
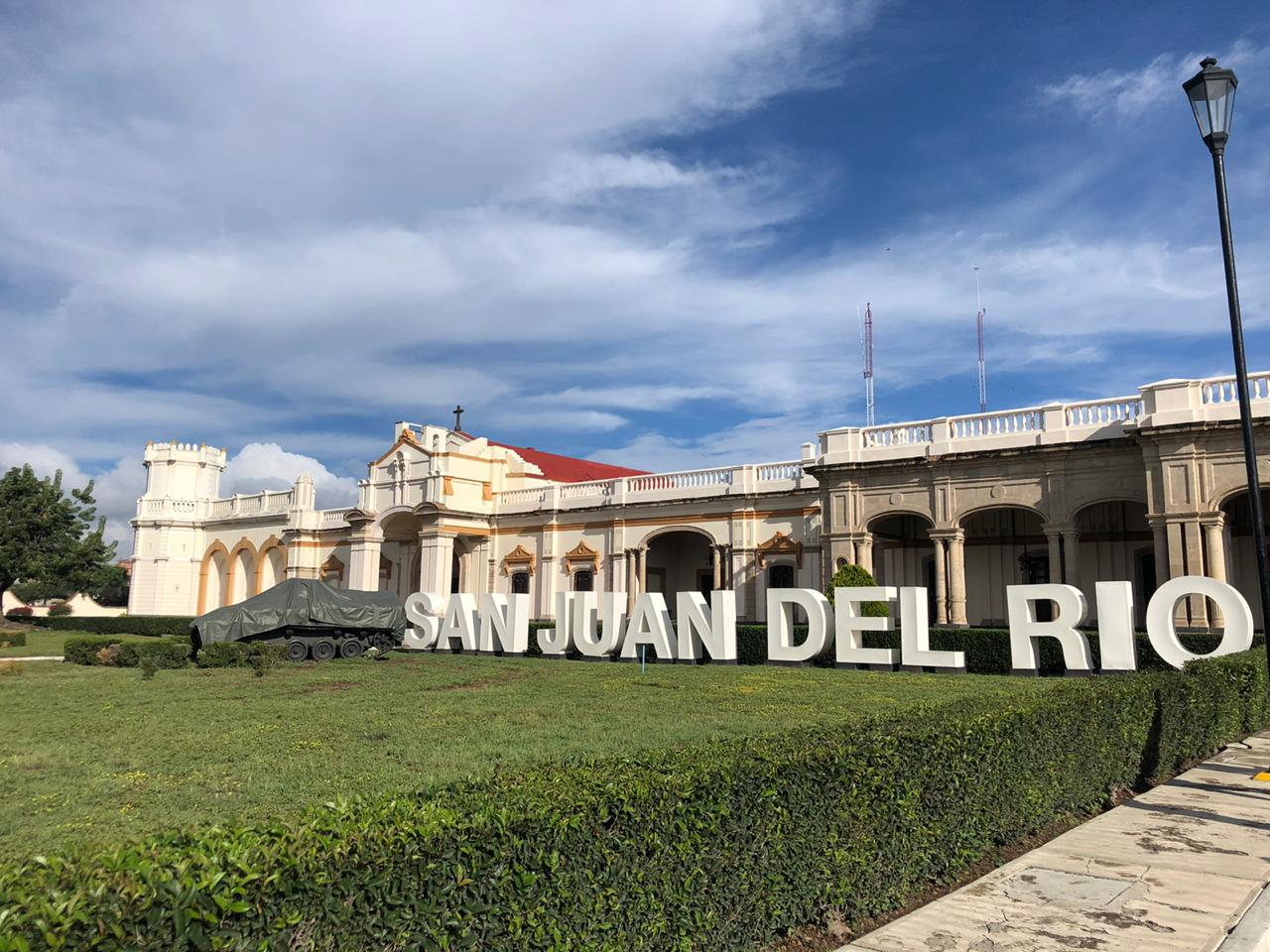

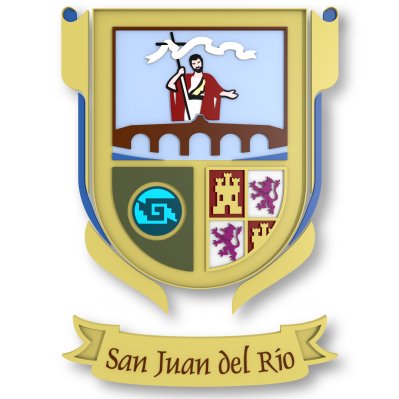
- Coat of arms
- Interactive map of San Juan del Río
- Country: Mexico
- State: Querétaro
- Municipal seat: San Juan del Río

Population (2020)
  - Total: 297,804
- Time zone: UTC-6 (Central)

San Juan del Río is a municipality in the central Mexican state of Querétaro. As of 2020, the municipality had a total population of 297,804. The municipal seat is at San Juan del Río.
