= José María Bocanegra =

President of Mexico in 1829

The Most Excellent José María Bocanegra
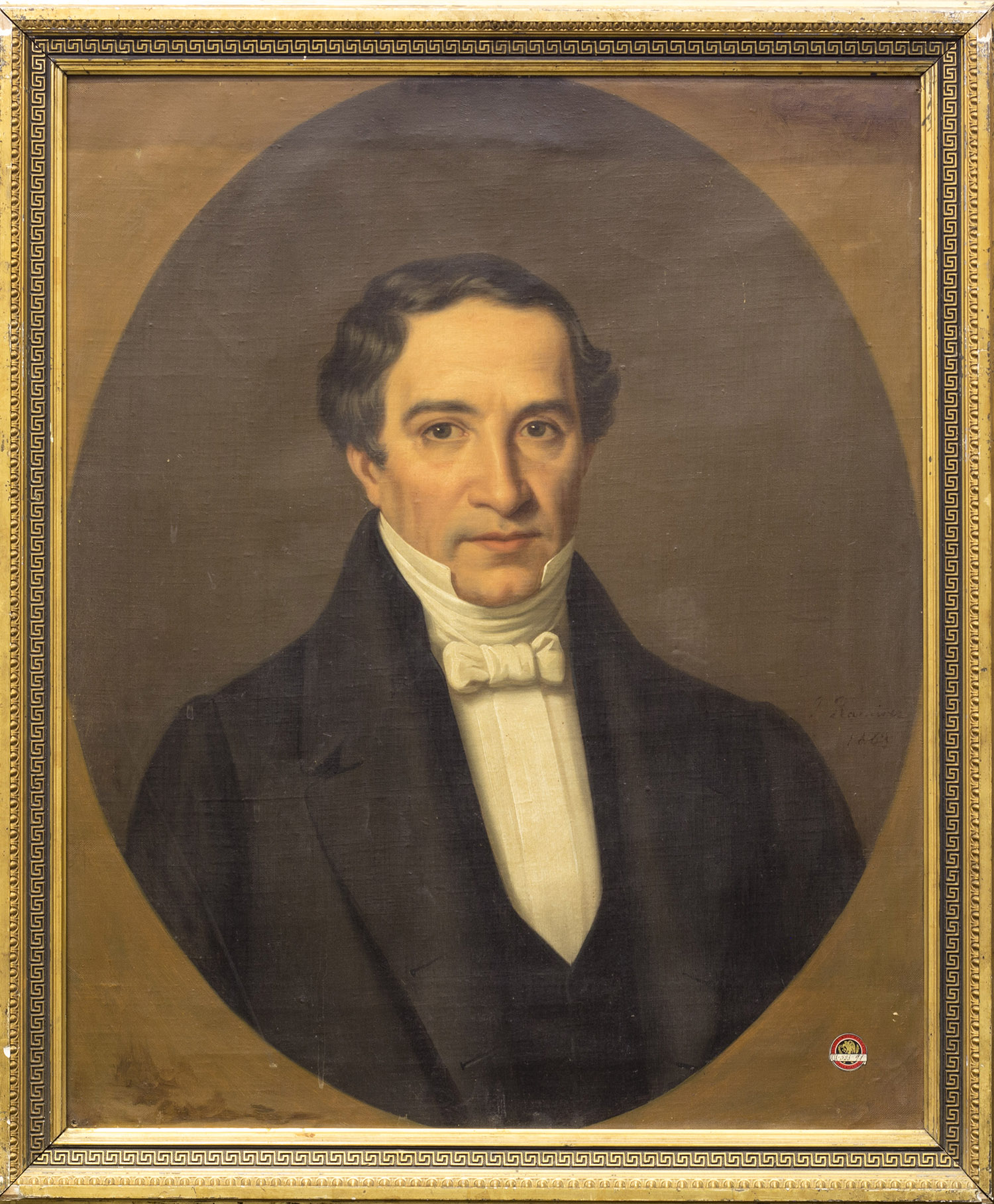
- Portrait of José María Bocanegra

3rd President of Mexico
- In office 18 – 23 December 1829
- Vice President: Anastasio Bustamante (Note: Bustamante was Vice President under Guerrero, and despite rebelling, he did not resign as Vice President and was not technically removed. Thus, he technically continued to serve as Bocanegra's Vice President.)
- Preceded by: Vicente Guerrero
- Succeeded by: Executive Triumvirate (of Lucas Alamán, Pedro Vélez, and Luis Quintanar); Anastasio Bustamante (as President) (Note: On December 23rd of 1829, an Executive Trimuvate was formed, and Bocanegra resigned. On December 31st, the Presidency was passed to Bustamante. During the trimunvate's existence, there technically wasn't a singular president, as the three men shared power. As such, Bustamante was the next president.)

President of the Chamber of Deputies
- In office 28 December 1826 – 31 January 1827
- Preceded by: Juan Cayetano Portugal
- Succeeded by: Juan Cayetano Portugal

Member of the Chamber of Deputies for Zacatecas
- In office 1 January 1827 – 24 January 1829

Member of the National Institutional Junta for Zacatecas
- In office 2 November 1822 – 7 March 1823

President of the Chamber of Deputies for Zacatecas
- In office 24 February – 31 October 1822

Personal details
- Born: 25 May 1787 Labor de la Troje, Nueva Galicia, New Spain (now Calvillo, Aguascalientes, Mexico)
- Died: 23 July 1862 (aged 75) Mexico City
- Party: Popular

José María de los Dolores Francisco Germán del Espíritu Santo Bocanegra y Villalpando (Spanish pronunciation: [xosemaˈɾia βokaˈneɣɾa]; 25 May 1787 – 23 July 1862) was a Mexican lawyer and statesman who was briefly interim president of Mexico in December 1829 during a coup attempt against president Vicente Guerrero. He previously served in various government positions, including President of the Chamber of Deputies and as a member of the Chamber of Deputies for Zacatecas.

He was appointed interim president by congress while President Guerrero personally led his troops against the insurrection. Five days later the rebels stormed the National Palace and overthrew Bocanegra, upon which they set up an executive triumvirate led by Pedro Vélez.

== Biography ==
Bocanegra graduated from the Colegio de San Ildefonso in Mexico City, becoming a lawyer. During the colonial period he was a lawyer for the Audiencia and a member of the College of Attorneys. He was vice-president of the Committee of Charity of the Hospice for the Poor. During the First Mexican Empire he supported Agustín de Iturbide's election to the throne, but opposed his later exercise of arbitrary power. He became a deputy to the first Mexican Constituent Congress in 1824.

Bocanegra entered the Chamber of Deputies in 1827, and on 26 January 1829, President Guadalupe Victoria named him Minister of Internal and External Relations. He continued to hold this position with the change of administration to Vicente Guerrero, until 1 April 1829.

On 4 December 1829, Vice-President Anastasio Bustamante rose in revolt against Guerrero (Plan de Jalapa). Guerrero received permission from Congress to take the field to combat the rebels. On 16 December 1829, Bocanegra was appointed interim president by Congress during Guerrero's absence by virtue of his position as president of the Supreme Court. He took office on December 18 and served until 23 December 1829, for only six days. On the latter date, the military garrison of Mexico City joined the Plan de Jalapa and withdrew recognition of Bocanegra. They installed an executive triumvirate of Pedro Vélez, Lucas Alamán and Luis de Quintanar. Bocanegra returned to his professional duties as a lawyer.

Later, Bocanegra was Minister of the Treasury under Presidents Valentín Gómez Farías and Antonio López de Santa Anna (26 April 1833 to 12 December 1833) and Minister of External Relations and of the Treasury under presidents Santa Anna, Nicolás Bravo and Valentín Canalizo (through 18 August 1844).

Bocanegra was known as an honorable and capable man who was uncomfortable participating in politics but felt it to be his duty to do so. He wrote the Memorias para la Historia de México Independiente. His nephew Francisco González Bocanegra was the author of the Himno Nacional Mexicano (the Mexican National Anthem). José María Bocanegra died on 23 July 1862 in the Federal District.

== See also ==
- List of heads of state of Mexico

Political offices
Preceded by Vicente Guerrero	President of Mexico; 18–23 December 1829	Succeeded by Pedro Vélez, Lucas Alamán and Luis de Quintanar
