= Macedonio Alcalá =

Macedonio Alcalá Prieto
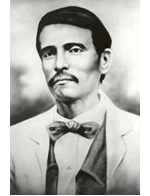
- Macedonio Alcalá Prieto

Background information
- Born: September 12, 1831; Oaxaca, Oaxaca
- Died: August 24, 1869 (aged 37) Oaxaca, Oaxaca
- Occupations: violinist, pianist, and songwriter

Macedonio Alcalá Prieto (September 12, 1831 in Oaxaca, Oaxaca – August 24, 1869 in Oaxaca, Oaxaca) was a Mexican violinist, pianist and songwriter remembered today especially for his waltz, "Dios nunca muere" (God Never Dies).

Alcalá was born in the City of Oaxaca in 1831. He showed an early interest in music and began attending a school established by Professor José Domingo Martinez. His musical talent was soon evident, and he learned to play the piano, cello, viola, flute, and ophicleide. He was an accomplished musician with all these instruments, but his main instrument was the violin. As a violinist, he was in demand not only in the churches but also at popular dances and social gatherings.

His persistence and dedication were rewarded by a scholarship from the State of Oaxaca, allowing him to continue his studies in Mexico City. At the conclusion of his studies he returned to Oaxaca, where he became a member of the Philharmonic Society of Santa Cecilia, an orchestra specializing in the performance of works of regional composers. A short time later he became the director of the Banda de Música de Oaxaca.

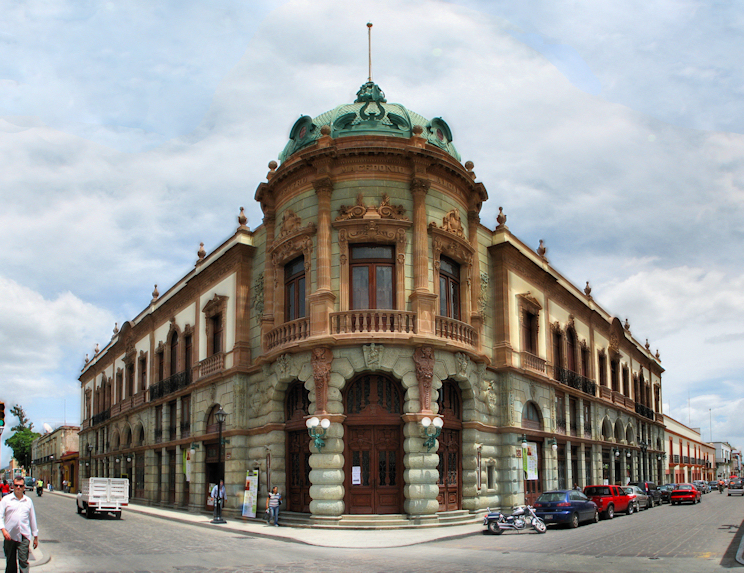
The Macedonio Alcala Theater in Oaxaca de Juarez, Oaxaca, Mexico.

A few years later he moved to Yanhuitlán. On July 30, 1854, Alcalá, 23, married Petronila Palacios, 21, of Yanhuitlán. They had three children, two boys, and a girl. Although he was recognized as an accomplished musician, he was unable to earn enough money in the profession to support his family. This led to depression and alcoholism. He intended to return to Oaxaca but fell ill of tuberculosis. His brothers refused to help, but the Philharmonic Society of Santa Cecilia came to his aid, supplying a doctor, medicines, and other forms of support.

During his convalescence, a delegation of Indigenous from a nearby town, Tlacolula, arrived with the request that he compose a waltz in honor of the Virgin Mary, patron of their town. Although still far from well, Alcalá worked hard on the waltz, "Dios nunca muere". It was a huge success from the first time it was played in public, and the town was very grateful.

About 1867 he became professor of music at the Hacienda de la Concepción.

He died in 1869 in Oaxaca. After his death, his brother Bernabé published "Dios nunca muere" under his own name, but natives of Tlacolula protested, and demonstrated that the work was really by Macedonio. The waltz is now the unofficial state anthem of Oaxaca. Oaxaqueños stand when they hear it.

Alcalá was said to be passionate and high-strung, characteristics that distinguished his playing and his compositions. But he passed his life struggling with poverty, disease and alcoholism. Few of his compositions survive because he was remiss in transcribing his improvisations. Among the surviving works are "Marcha Funebre" (Funeral March), "Solo dios en los cielos" (Only God in Heaven), "El Cohete" (The Rocket), "Ave Maria" and of course the well-known waltz "Dios nunca muere".

He died in Oaxaca in 1869, at the age of 37. A theater and a street are named for him in that city.
