= José Ignacio Gutiérrez =

Spanish cyclist

Personal information
- Full name: José Ignacio Gutiérrez Cataluña
- Born: 1 December 1977 (age 48) Valencia

Cycling career
- Sport: Cycling
- Current team: Retired
- Discipline: Road
- Role: Rider

Amateur team
- 2004: Caja Castilla-La Mancha

Professional teams
- 2000–2001: LA–Pecol
- 2002–2003: Kelme–Costa Blanca
- 2005–2006: Phonak
- 2007: Team LPR

José Ignacio Gutiérrez Cataluña (born 1 December 1977) is a Spanish former cyclist.

== Major results ==
2004
1st Stage 2b Vuelta a Extremadura
1st Stage 4 Circuito Montañés
