= Pedro Vélez =

Mexican politician (1787–1848)

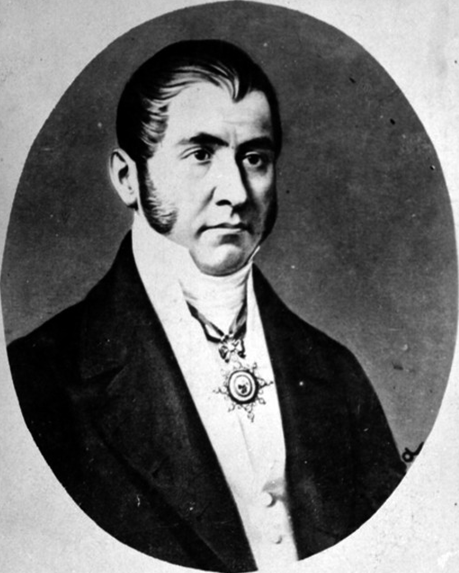
- Vélez in a lithograph by Agustín Casasola extracted from an unknown book from the 19th century.

President of Mexico
- In office 23 – 31 December 1829 Serving with Lucas Alamán and Luis de Quintanar
- Preceded by: José María Bocanegra
- Succeeded by: Anastasio Bustamante

Personal details
- Born: 28 July 1787 Zacatecas, Nueva Galicia, New Spain (now Zacatecas, Zacatecas)
- Died: 5 August 1848 (aged 61) Mexico City, Mexico

José Pedro Antonio Vélez de Zúñiga (28 July 1787 – 5 August 1848) was a Mexican politician and lawyer. In the aftermath of a successful coup against president Vicente Guerrero, he was placed at the head of a triumvirate that briefly led the Mexican government during the last days of 1829.

== Early life ==
Pedro Velez was born in Zacatecas in the year 1787 and, after completing his primary studies there, he moved to Guadalajara to study law. He was a legal advisor to General Cruz and after moving to Mexico City shortly after independence he was made president of the Supreme Court upon its establishment in January 1825, being considered an honest man and an able jurist, having also already been a member of the provincial deputation in Guadalajara.

== Executive Triumvirate ==
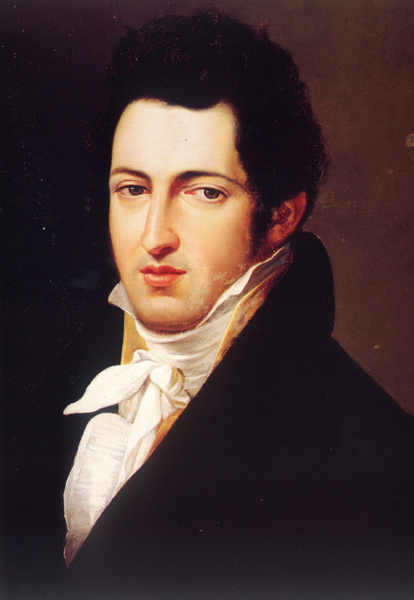
Lucas Alamán

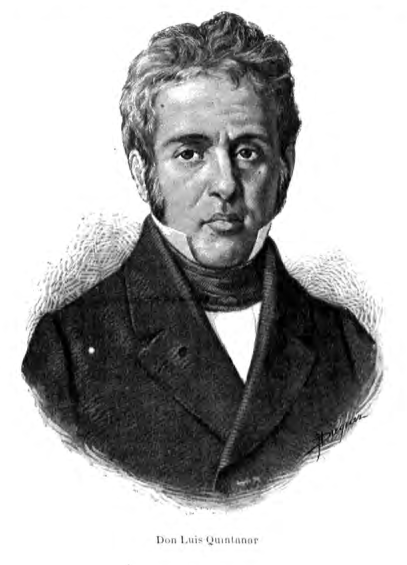
Luis de Quintanar

In 1829, a revolt known as the Plan of Jalapa flared up against President Vicente Guerrero, led ironically by his own vice president Anastasio Bustamante. President Guerrero stepped down from the presidency and handed it over to José María Bocanegra in order to personally lead his troops against the rebels. In December 1829 the Plan of Quintanar, a pronunciamiento in favor of the rebels was proclaimed within the capital and aided by Jose Ignacio Esteva, the governor of the federal district. Interim President Bocanegra and the commandant general Anaya made no moves to suppress the revolt so on the night of 22 December, the rebels stormed the National Palace and captured it without resistance.

The rebels then set up an interim executive triumvirate with Pedro Vélez as the president. The other two members were Lucas Alamán and Luis de Quintanar. The executive only lasted two weeks and focused on consolidating the revolution. The partisans of Guerrero: Lorenzo de Zavala, Manuel Rejon, and Fernando del Valle were arrested but were released a few days later upon promising to recognize the new government. On January 1, 1830, power passed over to Anastasio Bustamante.

== Later life ==
He was made Minister of Justice in 1843. He died on August 5, 1848.

== See also ==
- List of heads of state of Mexico

== Sources ==
- (in Spanish) "Vélez, Pedro", Enciclopedia de México, v. 14. Mexico City, 1996, ISBN 1-56409-016-7.
- (in Spanish) Cosío Villegas, Daniel. Historia General de México, El Colegio de México, México, 1976, ISBN 968-12-0969-9 .
- (in Spanish) García Puron, Manuel, México y sus gobernantes, v. 2. Mexico City: Joaquín Porrúa, 1984.
- (in Spanish) Orozco Linares, Fernando, Gobernantes de México. Mexico City: Panorama Editorial, 1985, ISBN 968-38-0260-5.

Political offices
Preceded by José María Bocanegra	Member of the Executive Triumvirate of Mexico; 23–31 December 1829	Succeeded by Anastasio Bustamante
