= Ramón Músquiz =

American politician

6th Governor of Coahuila and Texas
- In office June 15, 1835 – July 18, 1835
- Preceded by: José María Viesca
- Succeeded by: José Miguel Falcón

Personal details
- Born: 1797 Santa Rosa de Múzquiz, Coahuila, New Spain, Spanish Empire
- Died: 27 November 1867 (aged 69–70) Moncolova, México
- Profession: Politician and soldier

Don Ramón Músquiz (1797–1867) was the political chief of Texas from 1828 to 1834 and in 1835. He promoted the expansion into Texas and peaceful relations of its population, regardless of their origins. Músquiz was also appointed governor of Coahuila and Texas in June 1835 but never served in office and resigned in July of that year.

== Biography ==
=== Early years ===
Don Ramón Isiah Músquiz was born in 1797 in Santa Rosa de Múzquiz, Coahuila. He was the son of Catarina Gonzales and Miguel Francisco Músquiz, who was a military officer. He was raised in a place of San Antonio, Texas, which was inhabited by presidio soldiers and settlers of Spanish, Mexican, and Anglo heritage, mostly from the northern Texas. Coming from a Basque family, his life was spent in the company of missionary friars and people of Canarian and Basque origins like himself. He developed friendships with prominent families of San Antonio, such as the Leal, Arocha, or Veramendi.

In 1800, Músquiz fought against the filibusters since the Stone House, which he became in a military headquarters where developed his operations against them. In the early 1820s, Músquiz traveled to several places in the province in order to carry out certain business in them. After living a time in Monclova, in the Mexican state of Coahuila, where he worked as a postmaster, he returned to San Antonio in the end of 1823, where he opened a store and participated in the politics of the city. In July 1825, he was appointed secretary to the Government of Texas and Coahuila, serving as political chief. He held the charge until August 1827. In following year, in January 1828, and thanks to his influences (his friendship with prominent families), he was appointed political chief of Texas, although he did not serve in office until 1830.

=== Career as political chief of Texas ===
During this mandate, Músquiz defended the American interests of Texas and tried to get their petitions approved, mainly slave ownership, the practice of smuggling, and defence against the Amerindians who frequently attacked their communities. He also tried to resolve disagreements between the Americans and the territory's Mexican authorities, although he rejected the convention that took place in San Felipe in October 1832 as illegal and opposed the Anglo-American troops. During the years of his mandate, in several of his letters to the viceroy of New Spain, he complained about the establishment of a foreign colony in Austin, because its inhabitants were speaking English, not Spanish, the official language of Texas.

Músquiz left the office on 1831/July 7, 1834, because he had health problems. Even after leaving the office of political chief, Músquiz continued to be active in political affairs while maintaining a strong defence of Mexican culture and affairs and federalism.

In 1835, he was appointment lieutenant governor of Agustín Viesca. Moreover, it was after the jailed of Viesca in June of thar year when Músquiz was appointed governor of the Coahuila and Texas state. His appointment was made in the presence of President General Antonio Lopez de Santa Ana. However, Martín Perfecto de Cos objected to the appointment, which he said that was null and void. So Múzquiz never served as governor and submitted his resignation the office citing "family reasons". Even the support of a large number of Anglo-Americans in Texas for his appointment did not get Muzquiz to consider taking over the state government.

Perfecto de Cos reelected him as a political chief. In December 1835, Cos ordered him to participate in the negotiations that were to take place between the Santa Ana's army and the Anglo-American settlers at the Siege of Bexar. Músquiz helped in the identification of the bodies of the people who had died defending The Alamo.

Músquiz knew the effects and consequences of New Spain government and its impact on Texas.

=== After his career as political chief of Texas ===
In 1836, he moved with his family to the city of Monclova, in Coahuila, Mexico. where in addition to experience security of his nation, lived some of his relatives, including his sister Josefa Músquiz, who was the mother of the first medicine man of Monclova, Don Simón Blanco.

Músquiz was known by people of Monclova for his experience in Texas government, so he was appointed political prefect - although as ad interim - in 1853 and 1858. In addition, he was one of the largest shareholders in terms of water rights, in the bags of water from San Francisco and San Miguel (now part of the Pueblo), to whose inhabitants he championed, with others people of Texas, for protect the guarantees of the state governments of Nuevo Leon and Coahuila to them, headed by former resident of Monclova Santiago Vidaurri Valdés.

While he defended him, the government he represented required the delivery to ecclesiastical authorities of all the funds in support of the army to the north, where they fought many of the inhabitants of Monclova. Following this, in 1857, Father José María Villarreal Montemayor, claimed the water from the Confraternity of the Immaculate, property of the inhabitants of the village of San Francisco in Tlaxcala and, although they gave a large sum of money, he get the title of ownership. He refused to deliver the flow of the confraternity of the Virgin of Zapopan, that he previously divided among his family, so Múzquiz was forced to banish him, sending him into exile (he returned years later). In late 1840, Músquiz returned to Texas to demand the return of the lands he had left behind when he migrated to Monclova. After evacuating French troops of Jeaningros in Monclova, he died on 27 November 1867.

== Family ==
Don Ramon Músquiz married with Tejano Francisca Castañeda in San Antonio on December 16, 1823, and had eight children in a period of more than ten years from 1825 to 1847. Two of his children were born in 1830: Francisca and Ramón Músquiz Castañeda. The last of them followed the example of his father, occupying for long periods the Monclova political leadership and the mayoralty. A second son, Octaviano Múzquiz, served for a time as mayor of Monclova, and died in November 1871 in a shooting incident.
