= Lucas Alamán =

Mexican statesman, historian, and scientist (1792–1853)

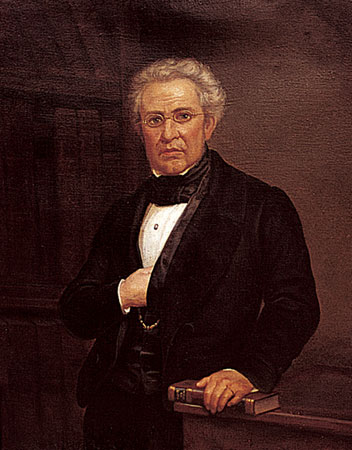

Minister of Interior and Exterior Relations of Mexico
- In office 20 April – 2 June 1853
- President: Antonio López de Santa Anna
- Preceded by: José Miguel Arroyo
- Succeeded by: José Miguel Arroyo
- In office 12 January 1830 – 20 May 1832
- President: Anastasio Bustamante
- Preceded by: Manuel Ortiz de la Torre
- Succeeded by: José María Ortiz Monasterio
- In office 12 January 1825 – 26 September 1825
- President: Guadalupe Victoria
- Preceded by: Juan Guzmán
- Succeeded by: Manuel Gómez Pedraza
- In office 15 May – 21 September 1824
- Preceded by: Pablo de La Llave
- Succeeded by: Juan Guzmán
- In office 16 April 1823 – 23 April 1824
- Preceded by: José Ignacio García Illueca
- Succeeded by: Pablo de La Llave

Personal details
- Born: 18 October 1792 Guanajuato, New Spain
- Died: 2 June 1853 (aged 60) Mexico City, Mexico
- Party: Conservative
- Education: Royal College of Mines
- Occupation: Entrepreneur, historian, politician, scientist, writer
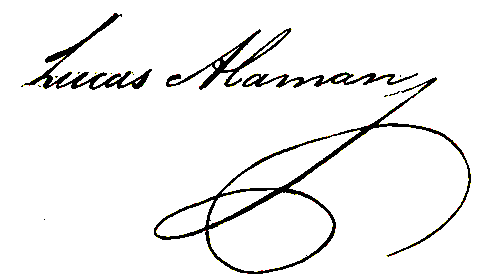
- Signature
- Scientific career
- Fields: Botany
- Author abbrev. (botany): Alamán

Lucas Alamán (Note: His full baptismal name was Lucas Ygnacio José Joaquín Pedro de Alcántar Juan Bautista Francisco de Paula de Alamán y Escalada.) (18 October 1792 – 2 June 1853) was a Mexican scientist, conservative statesman, historian, and writer. He came from an elite Guanajuato family and was well-traveled and highly educated. He was an eyewitness to the early fighting in the Mexican War of Independence when he witnessed the troops of insurgent leader Miguel Hidalgo y Costilla sack Guanajuato City, an incident that informed his already conservative and antidemocratic thought.

He has been called the "arch-reactionary of the epoch...who sought to create a strong central government based on a close alliance of the army, the Catholic Church and the landed classes." He has been considered the founder of the Conservative Party. He has been compared to Klemens von Metternich, and was one of the prime voices advocating for the establishment of a monarchy in Mexico.

According to historian Charles A. Hale, Alamán was "undoubtedly the major political and intellectual figure of independent Mexico until his death in 1853 ... the guiding force of several administrations and an active promoter of economic development."

== Early life ==
Lucas Alamán was born to a wealthy family of Guanajuato on October 18, 1792. His father was Juan Vicente Alamán and his mother was Maria Ignacia Escalada. His father had immigrated from Navarre and accumulated a fortune in mining, while his mother was member of a distinguished American-born Spanish family, and held the title of the fifth marchioness of San Clemente. Alamán's father was his mother's second husband, following the death of her first husband, Brigadier Gabriel de Arechederreta. Alamán had an older sister, María de Luz Estefanuia Anna José Ignacia Alamán y Escalada, born 1782, and an older half-brother, Juan Bautista Arechederreta.

He studied at the amiga, a children's school, run by Dona Josefa Camacho, and continued his studies at the Bethlehem School where Fr. Jose de San Geronimo taught Alamán how to write. In gratitude for the education that was provided, Alamán's father funded a renovation of its building.

Alamán moved on to learn Latin and mathematics, and his father began introducing him to the management of the mining industry, a field in which the elder Alamán expected his son to work in one day. In 1808, a sixteen year old Alamán visited Mexico City where he learned French and then returned to Guanajuato where he continued to study mathematics, music, and drawing, while also reading the Latin classics. The Alamán family was wealthy and socially prominent through Alamán's early youth, but mining was an uncertain and volatile industry, and his father eventually suffered financial losses and died when Alamán was sixteen.

He studied at the Colegio de Minas in Mexico City, as well as in Freiburg and Göttingen, Germany.

=== Mexican War of Independence ===
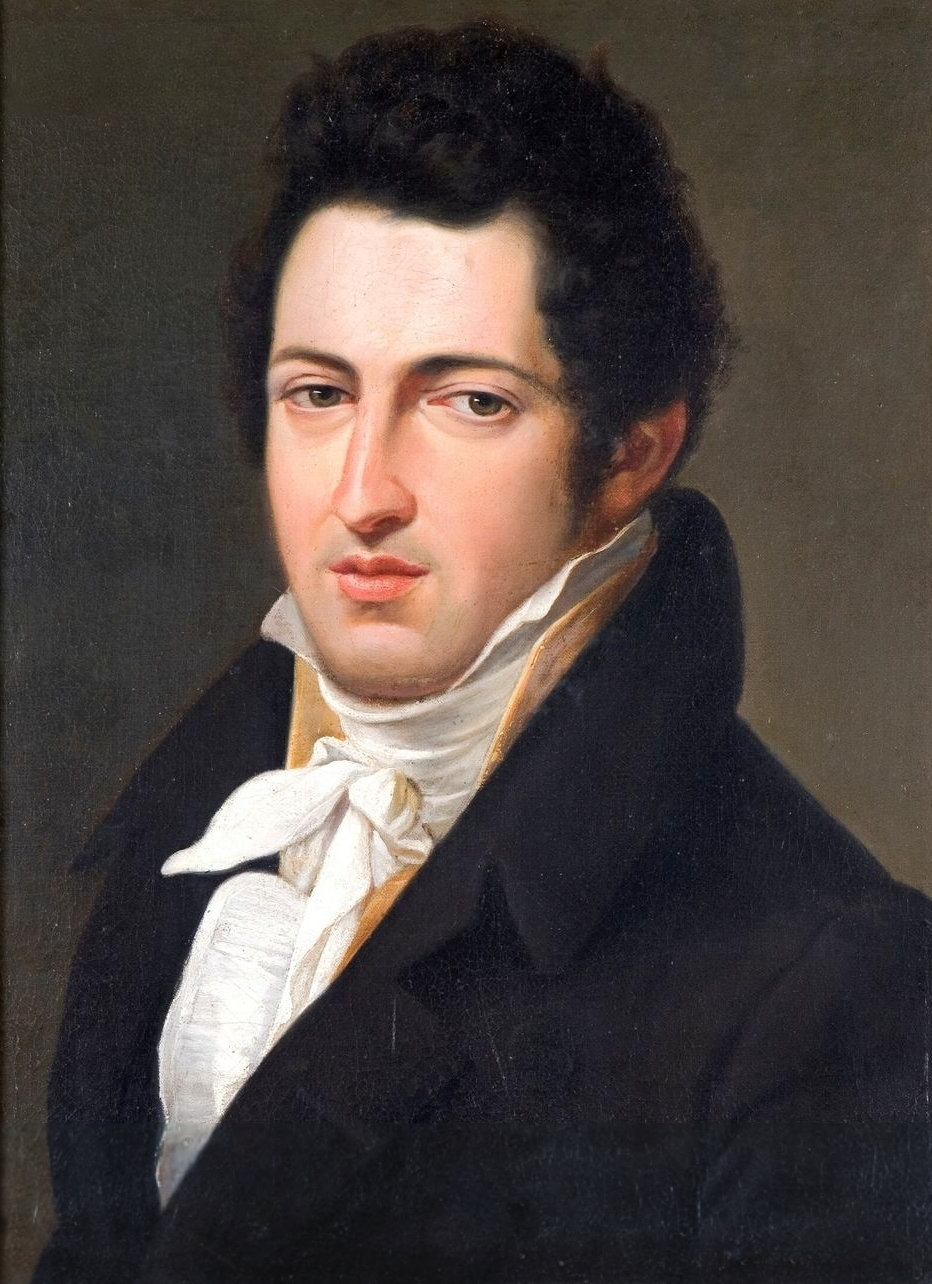
Portrait of Lucas Alamán in his youth

It was at this time that Alamán would witness decisive historical events that would forever change the future of Mexico. In 1808, the Spanish king Ferdinand VII was deposed by Napoleon who replaced him with his brother Joseph Bonaparte, sparking a constitutional crisis throughout the Spanish Empire, as rejection of the new king was almost universal. The government of New Spain chose to remain loyal to the imprisoned Ferdinand, but an uprising against the Spanish was triggered by the priest Miguel Hidalgo y Costilla on September 16, 1810, a date which would eventually be commemorated as the Mexican Independence Day

He witnessed the sack of Guanajuato after the capture of the Alhóndiga de Granaditas in the early stages of the Mexican War of Independence during which the unorganized and ragged troops of Miguel Hidalgo y Costilla killed those taking refuge inside. Alamán fled with his family to Mexico City in December 1810. At Mexico City he continued his studies in mining. He studied chemistry, mineralogy, calculus, and crystallography. It was amidst his discussions with the well travelled faculty that he also began to desire to travel to Europe where he wished to perfect his French and learn Italian and English.

=== Travels through Europe ===
He departed in January 1814 and first arrived at Spain where he visited Madrid and the Royal Palace of the El Escorial. He then passed on to France where he arrived in Paris and visited Father Mier on whose recommendation Alamán was able to meet with Bishop Gregoire. He continued his studies in Paris under René Just Haüy, Jean-Baptiste Biot, and Louis Jacques Thénard, and attended late night sessions of the Atheneum where he also began to learn German. Alamán was present in Paris during Napoleon's return from Elba, during the Hundred Days, with Alamán leaving the country shortly afterward for a brief sojourn in Great Britain before returning to France. He next traveled to Italy, passing by Mont Cenis, and arriving in Turin. He visited the battlefields of Pavia and Marengo and headed towards Milan, passing through Bologna and Florence before arriving in Rome where he was present for the Feast day of St. Peter which he spent with the family of the Spanish Cardinal Bardaji. He next visited Switzerland and followed the Rhine to Frankfurt. Alamán studied mining in Germany and visited Berlin before departing towards Holland and returning to France by 1818.

=== Delegate to the Cortes ===
He received the news that one of his family's financial interests had failed, and sought to remedy the matter through the application of his studies. He sought to bring to Mexico the technique of separating silver and gold through the use of sulfuric acid in contrast to the old technique of using nitric acid. He traveled to Madrid and succeeded in gaining permission from the government for doing so. He was the delegate of Mexico in the Cortes and worked to better the mining industry.

Alamán arrived back in Mexico in February, 1820. Spain at this time through the Constitution of 1812 had granted representation to its colonies in the Spanish Cortes and Alamán was among the Mexican deputies sent to Madrid that year representing the province of Guanajuato. He left for Spain with the rest of the deputies just as Agustin de Iturbide’s Plan of Iguala began to gain ground, and which would ultimately gain independence for Mexico in September 1821.

Alamán defended the rights of his district's mining interests and amidst ambiguous news regarding the progress of the Plan of Iguala, he also with the rest of the deputies lobbied the Spanish Cortes to establish in New Spain a more independent government. After the legislative session ended, Alamán rejected a post in the Spanish government and returned to Mexico.

== First Mexican Republic ==
Alamán was administering his family's mining interests during which he witnessed the fall of the First Mexican Empire and the establishment of the provisional government known as the Supreme Executive Power. Due to his experience in the Spanish Cortes, the Executive Power named Alamán as the Minister of the Interior and the Exterior. Alamán established a national archive and also a national museum. He allotted funds to the dying San Carlos Academy of Fine Arts, and saved from destruction the Equestrian statue of Charles IV of Spain, which still survives to this day in Mexico City. He also hid the remains of Hernán Cortés, which were threatened by the popular anti-Spanish fury that erupted in the wake of independence. Alamán was named Minister of State in 1825 and succeeded in attracting British capital to Mexico. But he was ousted from government in less than a year.

He was part of the group of conservatives who ousted insurgent general Vicente Guerrero from the presidency, who himself came to power by coup in 1829. Alamán was a member of the triumvirate that briefly governed Mexico in 1829 after the Plan de Jalapa with the aim of installing conservative Anastasio Bustamante as president. Alamán was the leading figure of the conservatives as the regime change unfolded. Guerrero was captured by a merchant ship captain Picaluga paid 50,000 pesos for the deed, in January 1831, summarily tried in a court-martial, and executed a month later. Alamán viewed the execution of Guerrero as saving Mexico from "dissolution." Many Mexicans, however, saw Guerrero as a martyr and his execution was deemed by the liberal newspaper El Federalista Mexicano "judicial murder." The two conservative cabinet members considered most culpable for Guerrero's execution, Alamán and Secretary of War José Antonio Facio "spent the rest of their lives defending themselves from the charge that they were responsible for the ultimate betrayal in the history of the first republic, that is, that they had arranged not just for the service of Picaluga's ship but specifically for his capture of Guerrero." Alamán published a tract defending himself, drafted while in hiding in Mexico City. He also had many issues with the United States during this time.

Alamán returned to the post of Minister of Interior and Exterior Relations in 1830–1832 under the Bustamante government. It was in this capacity that he named Manuel Victoria the Governor of Alta California on March 8, 1830. In October 1830, he created the Banco Nacional de Avío, the first bank in Mexico, which provided the country with the financial infrastructure necessary for its burgeoning economy. Through this government investment bank, Alamán's plans to revive the textile industry, which took hold and prospered in Puebla and Veracruz even when Alamán was not part of the government.

== Centralist Republic of Mexico ==
After what he saw as the disaster of Texas independence from Mexico in 1836, Alamán largely retired from politics, though he continued to promote what he saw as the interests of the country by serving as Director de la Junta de Fomento de la Industria (Directorate for the Promotion of Industry) from 1839 until his death in 1853.

During the same period Alamán negotiated a deal with the United States to the north fixing the national borders of the two nations which held right up to the time of the Mexican–American War 1846–1848. He also promoted colonizing the northern provinces in order to stave off U.S. expansionism.

For most of the 1840s, he devoted himself primarily to writing the history of Mexico from the perspective of a conservative. His three-volume work Disertaciones sobre la Historia de la Republica mexicana (Mexico, 1844–1849) and his five-volume Historia de México, desde los primeros movimientos que prepararon su independencia en el año de 1808, hasta la época presente (Mexico, 1849–1852), stand as the major intellectual productions of the Conservative Party in nineteenth-century Mexico, and the only histories produced by a Mexican author of his era to view the Spanish presence in his country favorably.

== Mexican American War ==
Among his more important actions are the creation of the Natural History Museum in Mexico City and the foundation of Mexico's General National Archive. The latter has been very important for learning about the historical events in Mexico and understanding the political processes of the Mexican Republic. He also founded and ran a mining company, established the first metal foundry in independent Mexico in 1825, administered the estates of the descendants of Hernán Cortés, and served as president of the Mexico City ayuntamiento (city council) in 1849.

Although Alamán was in general anti-American, he was dismayed by the withdrawal of the U.S. Army, which had protected property against "bandits and rebels."

== Last years ==
Santa Anna and Lucas Alamán were in correspondence during Santa Anna's exile following the debacle of the Mexican American War. Alamán helped pave the way for Santa Anna's return to power with conservative support "if he agreed to a program of cessation of political activity against the Church and security for the holders of large propertied interests." Alamán returned to national public service in March 1853, when Santa Anna appointed him Minister of Foreign Relations. He is also known for a few things he wrote: Disertaciones sobre la historia de la república mejicana as well as Historia de México. Alamán served until his death from pneumonia on June 2, 1853.

== Published works ==
- Canción patriótica en celebridad de los días de nuestro augusto y deseado monarca. Mexico city: Oficina de Ontiveros 1812.
- Defensa del ex-ministro de relaciones D. Lucas Alamán, en la causa formada contra él y contra los ex-ministros de guerra y justicia del vice-presidente D. Anastasio Bustamante, con unas noticias preliminares que dan idea del origen de esta. Escrita por el mismo ex-ministro, que la dirige á la nación. Mexico City: Imprenta de Galván á cargo de M. Arévalo 1834.
- Historia de Méjico. 5 vols. Mexico City 1868–69.
- Memorias, la verdadera historia de esta república desde el año 1808 (1840)
- Liquidación general de la deuda esterior de la República Mexicana hasta fin de diciembre de 1841. Mexico City: Impreso por I. Cumplido, 1845.
- Disertaciones 3 vols. Mexico 1869.
- Documentos diversos. 4 vols. Mexico 1846.
- Ensayo sobre la decadencia de la minería en la Nueva España.

=== Archival materials ===
Ynsfran, Pablo Max. "Catalogo del Archivo de Don Lucas Alamán que se Conserva en la Universidad de Texas, Austin" Historia Mexicana Vol. 4, No. 2 (Oct. – Dec. 1954), pp. 281–316

== Honors ==
=== Eponymy ===
Genus

- (Orchidaceae) Alamania La Llave & Lex.

Species

- (Asteraceae) Perezia alamani (DC.)Hemsl.
- (Euphorbiaceae) Jatropha alamanii Müll.Arg.
- (Rhamnaceae) Colubrina alamanii G.Don
