= José María Viesca =

Mexican politician

José María Viesca y Montes

3rd Governor of Coahuila and Texas
- In office 4 July 1827 – 4 April 1831
- Preceded by: Víctor Blanco
- Succeeded by: Ramón Músquiz

President of the Constituent Congress of Coahuila and Texas
- In office 15 June 1827 – 24 June 1827
- Preceded by: Francisco Antonio Gutiérrez
- Succeeded by: José Ignacio Sánchez Navarro (as President of the Congress of Coahuila and Texas)
- In office 15 March 1827 – 24 April 1827
- Preceded by: Santiago Del Valle
- Succeeded by: Rafael Ramos Valdés
- In office 15 November 1826 – 15 December 1826
- Preceded by: Dionicio Elizondo
- Succeeded by: Juan Vicente Campos
- In office 15 December 1825 – 15 January 1826
- Preceded by: Rafael Ramos Valdés
- Succeeded by: Juan Vicente Campos

Personal details
- Born: 1787 Villa de Santa María de las Parras, Coahuila, Mexico
- Died: 1856 (aged 68–69)
- Profession: lawyer and politician

José María Viesca y Montes (1787–1856) was a lawyer and Mexican politician aligned with federalist ideology, who served as Governor of Coahuila and Texas (1827–1830). His brother, Agustín Viesca, took over the role of governor in 1835.

== Early life ==
Viesca y Montes was born in Villa de Santa María de las Parras, Coahuila. He had at least one brother, Agustín Viesca. He was the uncle of former governor of Coahuila Andrés S. Viesca Bagües and was Regidor of the City of Parras.

== Career ==
Like his brother, Agustín, he joined Plan of Iguala on 5 July 1821, but his signature was not recorded in the minutes because of his absence.

He was a member of the delegation of the Internal State East during the Constitutional Convention from 1823 to 1824 and a member of the legislature of Coahuila and Texas in 1824. Later, he was elected governor of Coahuila and Texas, which he held between 4 June 1827 and 4 April 1831. In 1833 he was senator in the same state.

In 1835, he opposed the centralist regime of Antonio Lopez de Santa Anna and Texas Independence, but he found little support for his federalist ideology. He was elected deputy for the state of Coahuila until the Constituent Congress of 1856. However, sickness prevented him from attending the conference, and he died the same year.

== Legacy ==
To commemorate both Viesca and Mexican President Anastasio Bustamante, the town of Alamo de Parras, in Coahuila, was named San José de Viesca and Bustamante. The town is now known as Viesca.
