= Family tree of Mexican monarchs =

This is the family tree of Emperors of Mexico and their descendants, mostly members of the House of Iturbide.

adoption
Agustín de Iturbide (1783–1824)	Ana María de Huarte y Muñiz (1786–1861)
Agustín Jerónimo de Iturbide y Huarte (1807–1866)	Ángel de Iturbide y Huarte (1816–1872)	Salvador de Iturbide y Huarte (1820–1856)
Maximilian I of Mexico (1832–1867)	Charlotte of Belgium (1840–1927)
Agustín de Iturbide y Green (1863–1925)	Salvador de Iturbide y Marzán (1849–1895)
Maria Josepha Sophia de Itúrbide (1872–1949)
María Gizella Tunkl von Aschbrunn (1912–1981)
Maximilian von Götzen-Iturbide (b. 1944)
