= Salvador de Iturbide y Huarte =

Mexican noble

Salvador de Iturbide
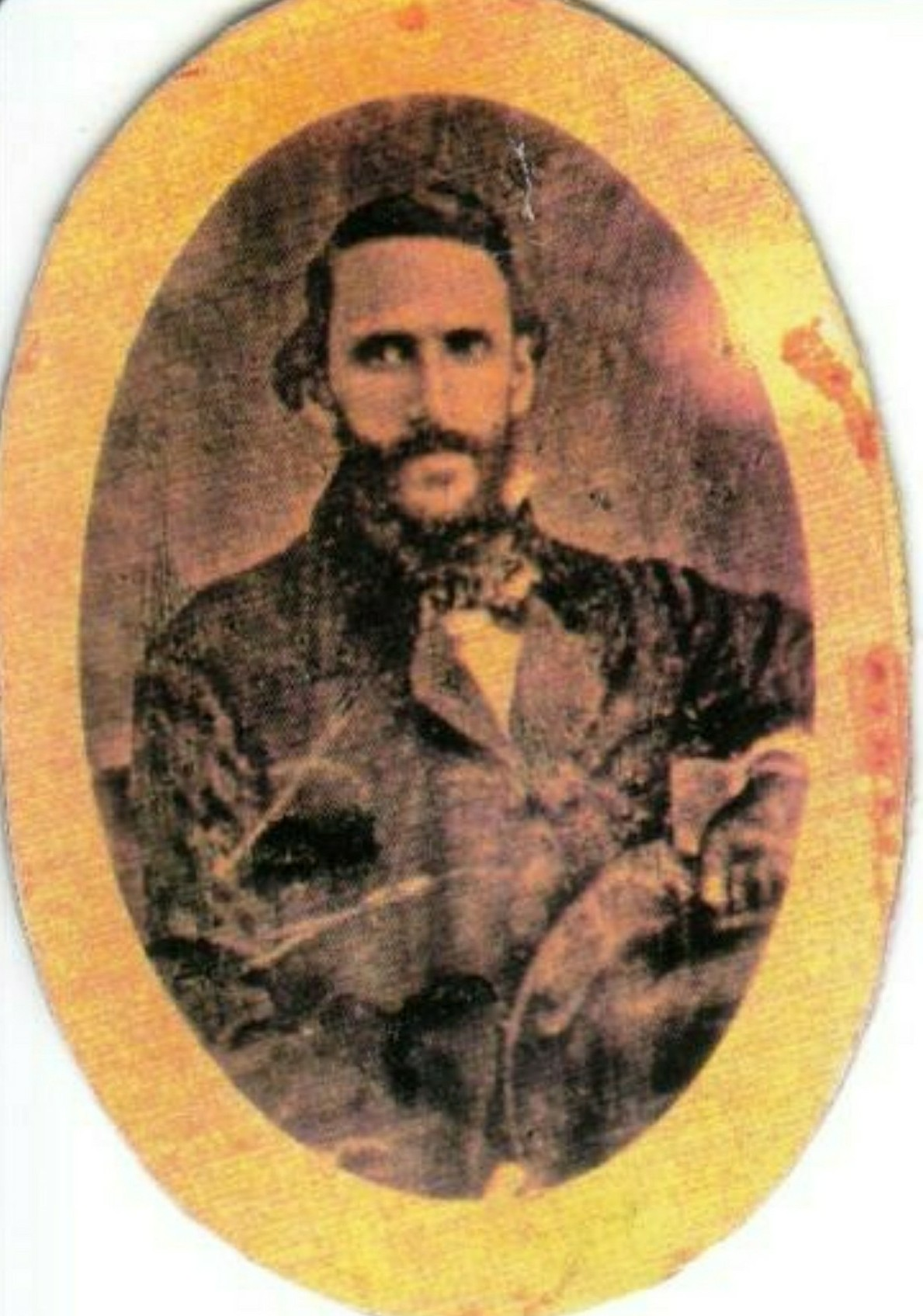
- Born: 17 July 1820; Mexico City, New Spain
- Died: 7 June 1856 (aged 35); Tepic, Nayarit, Mexican Republic
- Burial: Panteón Hidalgo, Nayarit
- Spouse: María del Rosario de Marzán y Guisasola
- Issue: Prince Salvador
Names
- Spanish: Salvador María de Iturbide y Huarte
- House: Iturbide
- Father: Agustín I of Mexico
- Mother: Ana María de Huarte y Muñiz

Salvador María de Iturbide y Huarte (17 July 1820 – 7 June 1856) was the eighth child (and third son) of Agustín I of Mexico and Empress Ana María Huarte. He was married in 1845 to Doña María del Rosario de Marzán y Guisasola. His descendants, through his son Salvador de Iturbide y Marzán, are the current pretenders to the Mexican Throne. He was in the Secretary Mexican Legation in Washington, D.C., in 1849.

== Biography ==
Prince Salvador was two years old when he became a Mexican Prince and was styled Highness by the Mexican Congress. He had nine brothers and sisters; Prince Imperial Agustín Jerónimo, Princess Sabina, Princess Juana, Princess Josefa, Prince Ángel, Princess María, Princess Dolores, Prince Felipe, and Prince Agustín Cosme. He was educated at Collège Sainte-Barbe, Paris, as well as in Vienna.

Salvador was the third in line to the throne, after his brother Ángel de Iturbide y Huarte. When Maximilian I of Mexico was crowned emperor, he contacted the Iturbide family to ask for the adoption of two boys: His Highness, Agustín de Iturbide y Green, son of Ángel, and His Highness Salvador de Iturbide y Marzán, son of Salvador.

He drowned in a boating accident on the Tepic River, Nayarit, on 7 June 1856.

== Decree ==
The Sovereign Mexican Constituent Congress decreed on June 22, 1822 the following:

- Art 1 °. The Mexican Monarchy, in addition to being moderate and Constitutional, is also hereditary.
- Art 2 °. Consequently, the Nation calls the succession of the Crown for the death of the current Emperor, his firstborn son Don Agustín Jerónimo de Iturbide. The Constitution of the Empire will decide the order of succession of the throne.
- Art 3 °. The crown prince will be called "Prince Imperial" and will have the treatment of Imperial Highness.
- Art 4 °. The legitimate sons and daughters of H.I.M will be called "Mexican Princes", and will have the treatment of Highness.
- Art 5 °. Don José Joaquín de Iturbide y Arreguí, Father of H.I.M, is decorated with the title of "Prince of the Union" and the treatment of Highness, during his life.
- Art 6 °. It is also granted the title of "Princess of Iturbide" and the treatment of Highness, during her life, to Doña María Nicolasa de Iturbide y Arámburo, sister of the Emperor.

== Ancestry ==
Ancestors of Salvador de Iturbide y Huarte

8. José de Iturbide y Álvarez de Eulate
4. José Joaquín de Iturbide y Arregui
9. María Josefa de Arregui y Gastelu
2. Augustín I of Mexico
10. Sebastián de Arámburu y Urdizibar
5. María Josefa de Arámburu y Carrillo de Figueroa
11. Micaela Nicolasa Carrillo de Figueroa y Villaseñor
1. Prince Salvador of Mexico
12. Juan Francisco de Huarte e Iriarte
6. Isidro de Huarte y Arrivillaga
13. Agustina Antonia de Arrivillaga y Minondo
3. Ana María de Huarte y Muñiz
14. Manuel Muñiz y Peo
7. Ana Manuela Muñiz y Sánchez de Tagle
15. Isabel Sánchez de Tagle y Veydacar
