= Prince of Mexico =

Prince of Mexico may refer to:

== 1st Mexican Empire ==
- Prince Imperial of Mexico, a title created after Mexico gained independence from the Spanish Empire as the official title of the heir apparent to the imperial throne of Mexico
- Princess of Iturbide, a title created for the older sister of the 1st Emperor of Mexico.
- Prince of the Union, a title created for the father of the 1st Emperor of Mexico. Don José Joaquín de Iturbide y Arreguí
- Mexican Prince, the title created for the legitimate sons and daughters of Agustín de Iturbide, 1st Emperor of Mexico

== 2nd Mexican Empire ==
- Princess of Iturbide, a title restored to designate to the daughter alive of Agustín de Iturbide
- Prince of Iturbide, a title created to designate to the grandsons of the 1st Emperor of Mexico adopted by Maximilian of Mexico
