= Agustín Jerónimo de Iturbide y Huarte =

Mexican politician

Agustín Jerónimo
- Prince Imperial of Mexico
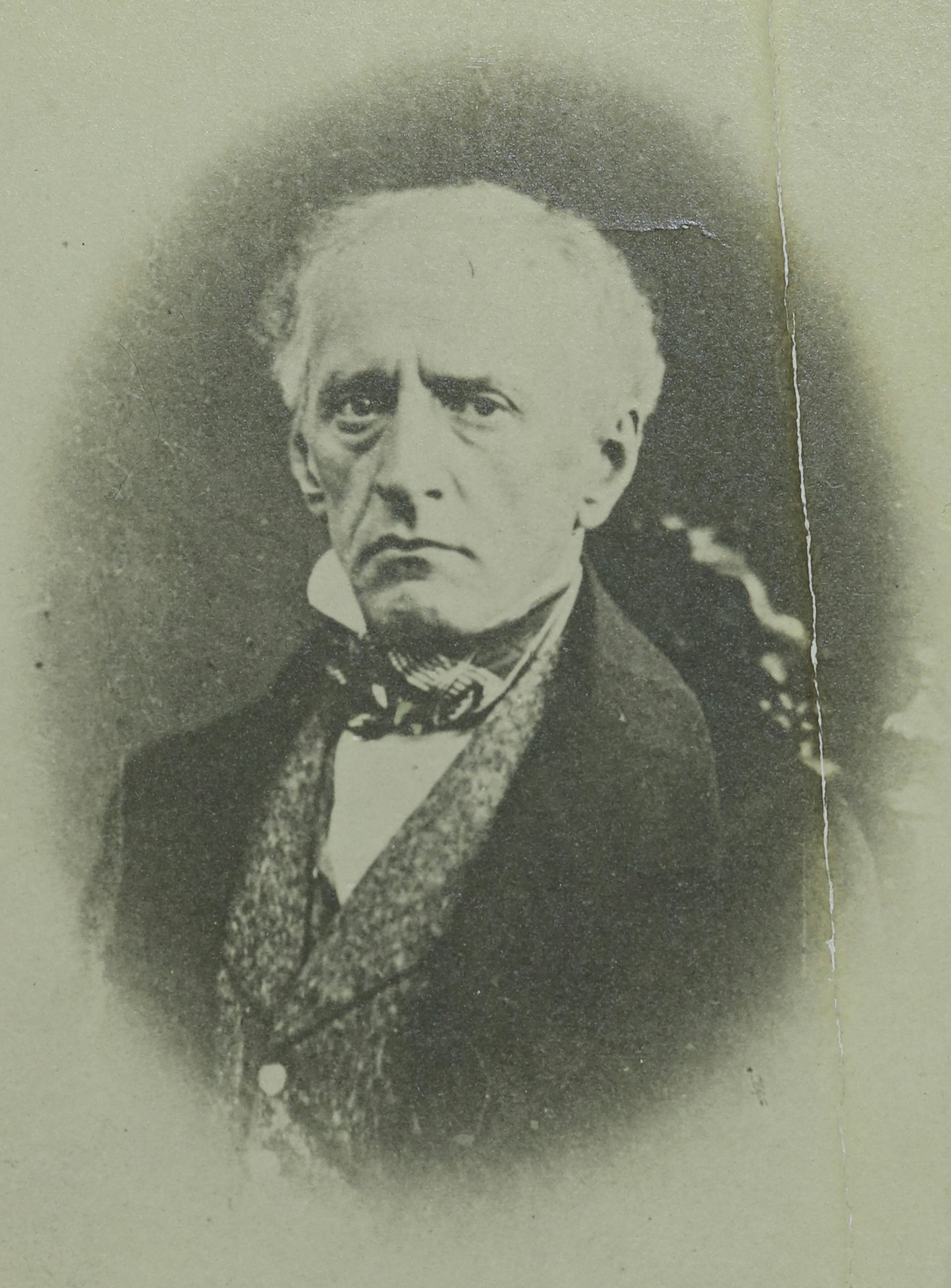
- Imperial Prince in 1865

Head of the Imperial House of Mexico
- Tenure: 19 July 1824 – 10 April 1864
- Predecessor: Agustín I
- Successor: Maximilian I (as Emperor); Agustín de Iturbide y Green (as Head of the House of Iturbide)
- Born: 30 September 1807; Valladolid, Michoacán, New Spain
- Died: 11 December 1866 (aged 59); New York City, New York, U.S.
- Burial: Roman Catholic Church of St John the Evangelist, Philadelphia, Pennsylvania
Names
- Spanish: Agustín Jerónimo de Iturbide y Huarte
- House: Iturbide
- Father: Agustín I of Mexico
- Mother: Ana María de Huarte y Muñiz
- Religion: Roman Catholicism

Styles of Agustín Prince Imperial of Mexico
- Reference style: His Imperial Highness
- Spoken style: Your Imperial Highness

Agustín Jerónimo de Iturbide y Huarte (30 September 1807 – 11 December 1866) was the eldest son of the first Emperor of Mexico, Agustín I of Mexico. He was the heir apparent to the First Mexican Empire and a member of the Imperial House of Iturbide. Later in life, he served as a military officer in South America and also worked as a diplomat for the United Mexican States at the Mexican embassy in the United States and in London, after his military career had ended in South America.

== Biography ==
Agustín Jerónimo de Iturbide y Huarte was born in the city of Valladolid in the state of Michoacán in New Spain. His parents were Agustín de Iturbide and Ana María de Huarte y Muñiz, they were Mexican of Spanish/Basque descent. His father was born in Valladolid, Viceroyalty of New Spain (now Morelia, Michoacán, Mexico) And his mother was born in Valladolid, Michoacán, New Spain (now Mexico).They owned large tracts of farmland, the two haciendas of Apeo and Guaracha, as well as more land in nearby Quirio. Agustín had several other siblings, including:

- Sabina de Iturbide y Huarte
- Juana de Iturbide y Huarte
- Josefa de Iturbide y Huarte
- Ángel de Iturbide y Huarte
- María de Jesús de Iturbide
- Dolores de Iturbide y Huarte
- Salvador de Iturbide y Huarte
- Felipe de Iturbide y Huarte
- Agustín Cosme de Iturbide y Huarte

He spent his early years with his mother and other siblings on their two haciendas, as his father was fighting in the Mexican War of Independence and was not often at home with his children. Eventually, he was able to build a successful military and political coalition and managed to capture Mexico City on 27 September 1821, decisively ending the war. On 19 May 1822, his father was elected Emperor of Mexico by the Mexican Congress. Young Agustín reportedly became so dizzy that he could hardly stand when he heard the news of his father's election as emperor of the new nation.

Only three days later, on 22 June 1822, the young Agustín was made heir apparent to the throne with the title of Prince Imperial of Mexico, which came with the style of Imperial Highness and the honorific title of "Don". All of his other siblings received the title of Prince or Princess of Mexico, with the style of Highness. The new imperial family moved into the Palace of Iturbide in Mexico City, where Agustín de Iturbide had lived before, when he was the President of the Regency.

Agustín de Iturbide was deposed on 19 March 1823 in the Plan of Casa Mata, initiated by the two generals Antonio López de Santa Anna and Guadalupe Victoria. Subsequently, the entire imperial family was forced to flee the country and left for Europe in the English ship Rawlins, shortly after the successful coup d'état.

=== Post monarchy ===
The imperial family first travelled to Livorno in the Grand Duchy of Tuscany but was eventually forced to leave by the authorities, due to pressure from the Spanish King. The former imperial family then reluctantly moved to the United Kingdom. Here, Agustín attended the prestigious Roman Catholic boarding school Ampleforth College, located in North Yorkshire. Agustín de Iturbide was eventually convinced by conservative political factions to return to Mexico and Don Agustín was left to his studies back in England with some of his siblings. Agustín de Iturbide returned to his homeland with his wife and two children on 14 July 1824, but was captured and executed shortly after. On his father's death he became the Titular Mexican Emperor and he would be a claimant to his father's empire for forty years until the Second Mexican Empire was established under Maximilian I of Mexico.

=== Bolívar's friend ===
Iturbide completed his education at Ampleforth College and received a letter of recommendation saying that he was "a good son, a good brother and a good patriot who will use his experiences and riches for God and for good".

After just a few years, Don Agustín left the UK and travelled to New Granada (present-day Colombia and Panama) where he eventually met and befriended Simón Bolívar, the military and political leader of Venezuela. Don Agustín was made an Adjutant General under Bolívar. When the Mexican foreign minister complained about the presence of the Prince Imperial in South America, Bolívar who wanted only to protect the young and unfortunate prince, replied this: "You must calm your mind to his presence, because he would not compete for his father's throne for a thousand reasons". Don Agustín accompanied Bolívar until the final moments of the latter's life and it is described in the official report on the hero's death: "Bolívar leaned on his friend and assistant Iturbide, when he helped him up the stairs to his bedroom just before nightfall". In 1831 the Mexican Congress declared that the banishment decree on the former imperial family had been lifted and the Prince Imperial subsequently returned to his homeland.

=== Later life and death ===
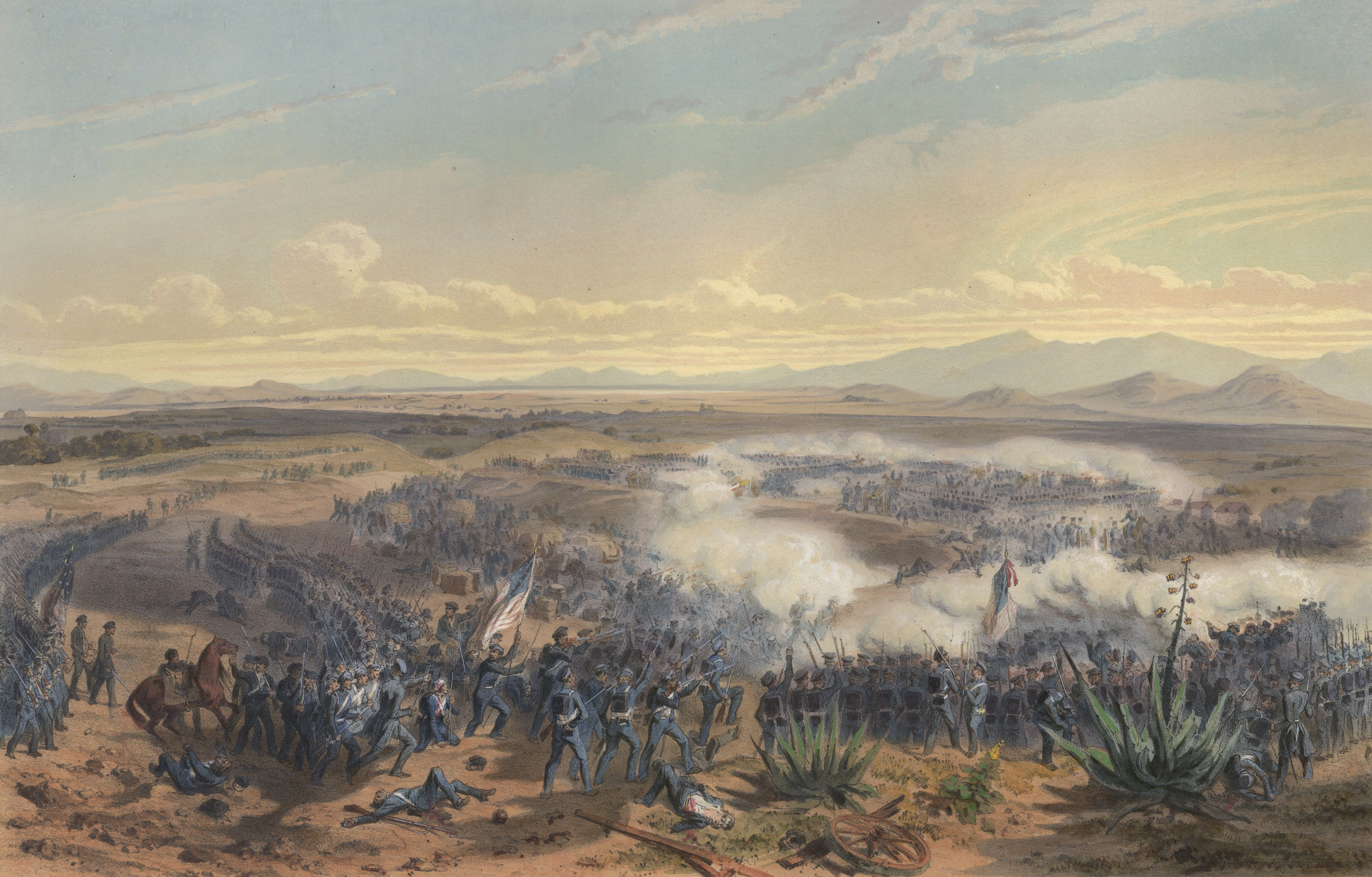
The Battle of Contreras

On his return to the United Mexican States he started working as a Mexican diplomat. He first served at the Mexican embassy in the United States, a post he would retain until 19 March 1833, and would later be transferred to London where he would be stationed until 1835. He was making only 3,500 pesos a year, but he still maintained the large fortune gathered by his deceased father. He also served as a volunteer in the Papal Zouaves, an infantry force created to protect the Papal States. At the outbreak of the Mexican–American War he decided to participate in the defence of his homeland. During the Battle of Contreras on 19 and 20 August 1847, he took command of the Celaya Regiment and tried to rouse his men with his famous patriotic cry: "With me boys! My father is the father of our independence".

When the Mexican monarchy was revived as the Second Mexican Empire under Maximilian I of Mexico, Don Agustín gave up his claim to the throne and voluntarily approved of the new emperor; he also approved Maximilian's request to adopt two of the Prince Imperial's nephews, Agustín de Iturbide y Green and Salvador de Iturbide y de Marzán. He remained the head of the former Imperial House of Iturbide. Though Don Agustín de Iturbide y Green was proclaimed the new heir apparent, he never received his uncle's title of Prince Imperial; this was due to Don Agustín still being alive.

Don Agustín died on 11 December 1866 in New York City. He had been an important figure in both the imperial monarchies; he was largely overlooked when working for the United Mexican States, but did gain some notoriety while serving under Simón Bolívar. The Prince Imperial was buried in Philadelphia next to his mother. Many members of the former Imperial family House of Iturbide would be buried at the same location. Because he died without ever marrying or fathering any legitimate children, his title of Prince Imperial of Mexico was transferred to Maria Josepha Sophia de Iturbide, the daughter of Don Salvador de Iturbide y de Marzán.

He fathered an illegitimate daughter by Nicolasa Fernández de Pierola, a woman from Arequipa in Peru. The daughter, called Doña Jesusa de Iturbide, would later marry the prominent Peruvian politician (and President of Peru after 1879) Nicolás de Piérola (They were first cousins). The current head to both the former imperial houses and the title of Prince Imperial of Mexico is Count Maximilian von Götzen-Iturbide.

== Decree ==
The Sovereign Mexican Constituent Congress decreed on 22 June 1822 the following:

- Art 1 °. The Mexican Monarchy, in addition to being moderate and Constitutional, is also hereditary.
- Art 2 °. Consequently, the Nation calls the succession of the Crown for the death of the current Emperor, his firstborn son Don Agustín Jerónimo de Iturbide. The Constitution of the Empire will decide the order of succession of the throne.
- Art 3 °. The crown prince will be called "Prince Imperial" and will have the treatment of Imperial Highness.
- Art 4 °. The legitimate sons and daughters of H.I.M will be called "Mexican Princes", and will have the treatment of Highness.
- Art 5 °. Don José Joaquín de Iturbide y Arreguí, Father of H.I.M, is decorated with the title of "Prince of the Union" and the treatment of Highness, during his life.
- Art 6 °. It is also granted the title of "Princess of Iturbide" and the treatment of Highness, during his life, to Doña María Nicolasa de Iturbide y Arámburo, sister of the Emperor.

== Ancestry ==
Ancestors of Agustín Jerónimo de Iturbide y Huarte

8. José de Iturbide y Álvarez de Eulate
4. José Joaquín de Iturbide y Arregui
9. María Josefa de Arregui y Gastelu
2. Agustín I of Mexico
10. Sebastián de Arámburu y Urdizibar
5. María Josefa de Arámburu y Carrillo de Figueroa
11. Micaela Nicolasa Carrillo de Figueroa y Villaseñor
1. Agustín Jerónimo de Iturbide y Huarte
12. Juan Francisco de Huarte e Iriarte
6. Isidro de Huarte y Arrivillaga
13. Agustina Antonia de Arrivillaga y Minondo
3. Ana María de Huarte y Muñiz
14. Manuel Muñiz y Peo
7. Ana Manuela Muñiz y Sánchez de Tagle
15. Isabel Sánchez de Tagle y Veydacar

== Honours ==
- Knight of the Order of Our Lady of Guadalupe (1st class)
- Knight of the Order of the Mexican Eagle (Ordinary class)

Agustín Jerónimo de Iturbide y Huarte House of Iturbide Born: 30 September 1807 Died: 11 November 1866
Titles in pretence
Preceded by Emperor Agustín I	— TITULAR — Emperor of Mexico; 19 July 1824 – 10 April 1864; Reason for succession failure: Empire abolished in 1823	Succeeded by Emperor Maximiliano I
