= Juana de Iturbide y Huarte =

Juana María de Iturbide
- Mexican Princess
- Born: 10 March 1812; Mexico City
- Died: 2 October 1828 (aged 16); Georgetown (Washington, D.C.), United States
- Burial: Georgetown Visitation Monastery
Names
- Spanish: Juana de Dios María Francisca Ramona Ignacia de Iturbide y Huarte
- Imperial House: Iturbide
- Father: Agustín I of Mexico
- Mother: Ana María Huarte

Juana de Dios María Francisca Ramona Ignacia de Iturbide y Huarte (10 March 1812 – 2 October 1828), was the third child of Agustín I of Mexico (Agustín de Iturbide) and Empress Ana María. She died at a young age at the Georgetown Visitation Monastery (Georgetown Visitation Preparatory School) in Washington, D.C.

== Biography ==
Juana was born in New Spain, when the colony was still under the control of King of Spain and ruled by the Viceroy of New Spain. Her birth year coincided with the Mexican War of Independence, which would catapult her father to fame and secure his place on the Mexican imperial throne.

The Iturbides originated from minor Spanish nobility of Basque descent, who came to Mexico in the mid-18th century. Juana had two elder siblings, Agustin Jeromino and Sabina, and several younger siblings: Josefa, Ángel, María, Dolores, Salvador, Felipe and Agustín Cosme. She was baptised as a Roman Catholic.

She was designated Princesa de México upon her father's accession in 1822. She was referred to as Her Highness rather than Imperial Highness, which was reserved for the Prince Imperial. In 1823, during the last days of the Mexican Empire, Juana was the sixth in line to the throne, after her four brothers and elder sister. Her father abdicated his throne after less than 10 months reign and the royal family was exiled from Mexico. On May 11, 1823, the royal family and some servants boarded the English ship "Rawlins", bound for Livorno, Italy. There her father rented a small country house and began to write his memoirs. Under pressure from Spain, Italy expelled the Iturbide family, and they moved to England.

Iturbide returned to Mexico and was executed July 9, 1824, in Padilla, Tamaulipas. The Dowager-Empress Ana Maria moved her family, including Juana, to the United States. They lived in Washington, D.C. and in Philadelphia on Spruce St. near 13th, and later at 226 Broad St.

Juana became a novice in the Visitation Monastery at Georgetown in Washington, D.C. On her deathbed, she professed herself a nun and took the name "Sister Margarita of Jesus, Marie and Joseph". She died at the age of 16 at the monastery, where she is also buried.

== Decree ==
The Sovereign Mexican Constituent Congress decreed on June 22, 1822 the following:

- Art 1 °. The Mexican Monarchy, in addition to being moderate and Constitutional, is also hereditary.
- Art 2 °. Consequently, the Nation calls the succession of the Crown for the death of the current Emperor, his firstborn son Don Agustín Jerónimo de Iturbide. The Constitution of the Empire will decide the order of succession of the throne.
- Art 3 °. The crown prince will be called "Prince Imperial" and will have the treatment of Imperial Highness.
- Art 4 °. The legitimate sons and daughters of H.I.M will be called "Mexican Princes", and will have the treatment of Highness.
- Art 5 °. Don José Joaquín de Iturbide y Arreguí, Father of H.I.M, is decorated with the title of "Prince of the Union" and the treatment of Highness, during his life.
- Art 6 °. It is also granted the title of "Princess of Iturbide" and the treatment of Highness, during his life, to Doña María Nicolasa de Iturbide y Arámburo, sister of the Emperor.
