= George Plater =

American politician (1735-1792)

George Plater III
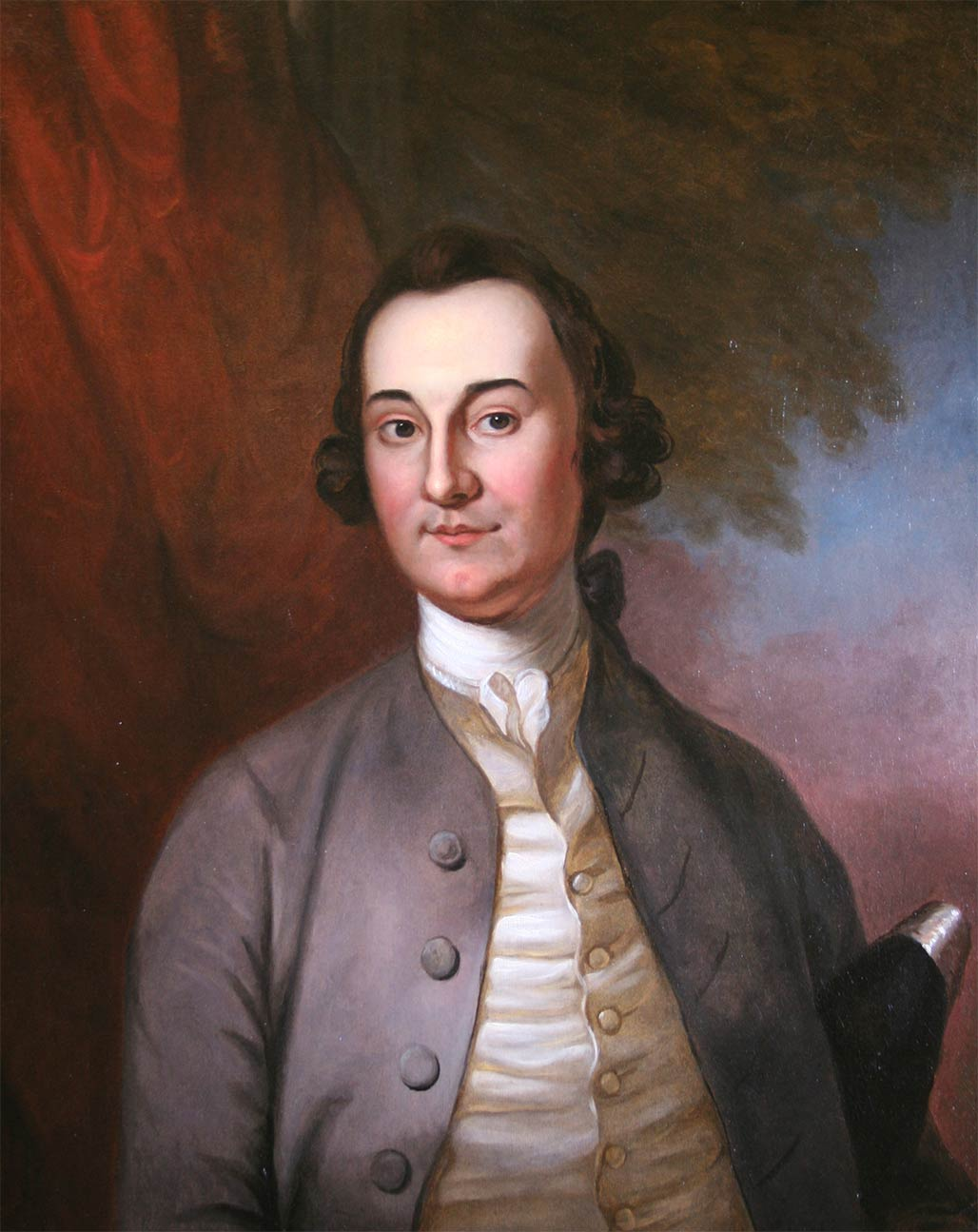
- Posthumous portrait by Charles Willson Peale, c. 1825

6th Governor of Maryland
- In office November 14, 1791 – February 10, 1792
- Preceded by: John E. Howard
- Succeeded by: James Brice

Member of the Maryland State Senate
- In office 1777–1790

Delegate to the Continental Congress from Maryland
- In office 1778–1780

Member of the Maryland House of Delegates
- In office 1757–1766

Personal details
- Born: November 8, 1735 Sotterley Plantation, Province of Maryland, British America (located in modern Hollywood, Maryland)
- Died: February 10, 1792 (aged 56) Annapolis, Maryland, U.S.
- Resting place: Sotterley Plantation
- Spouse(s): Hannah Lee; Elizabeth Rousby
- Education: College of William & Mary

George Plater III (November 8, 1735 – February 10, 1792) was an American planter, lawyer, and statesman from Saint Mary's County, Maryland. He represented Maryland in the Continental Congress from 1778 to 1780, and briefly served as the sixth governor of Maryland in 1791 and 1792.

== Early life and education ==
George Plater III was born at Sotterley, the family plantation near Leonards Town in the Province of Maryland.

His father, George II, had married Rebecca Addison Bowles, the widow of the plantation's founder, in 1729. His grandfather, George Plater I, was the acting Attorney General, 1691–1692; Receiver for Patuxent 1691-1707; Collector of Patuxent, 1691–1696; Receiver for Pocomoke, 1696–1697; Receiver General for Maryland, 1693–1696; and naval officer at Patuxent, 1693–1707.

His siblings included Rebecca Plater Tayloe, wife of John Tayloe II; Anne; Thomas Addison (died in infancy); and Elizabeth Norton.

== Political career ==
After receiving his early schooling at home, he attended the College of William and Mary in Williamsburg, Virginia, graduating in 1752. In 1753, he studied law in England and was admitted to the bar in Maryland. During 1757-1759, he was a delegate in the Maryland Lower House of Assembly. In 1767-77, he was a naval officer of the Patuxent District, and in 1771-74, he was a member of the Governor's Council. As the revolution neared, he represented St. Mary's County in the Annapolis Convention, which became a revolutionary government. He was appointed by the Maryland Council of Safety to collect funds for the attack on Quebec. On August 14, 1776, he was appointed to the ninth convention to draft Maryland's first constitution.

Maryland sent him as a delegate to the Continental Congress in 1778, and he represented his state until 1781. Under the new constitution, Plater served as president of the Maryland State Senate from 1781 until 1790.

When Maryland held a convention to consider the United States Constitution, Plater attended and was the president of the convention when they voted for ratification on April 28, 1788. The following year, he was chosen as a presidential elector. However, he did not vote.

In late 1791, Plater was elected governor, and took office in December. However, his term was short; he died after less than three months in office. He was buried in Sotterley, Maryland, but the site of his grave is unknown.

== Personal life ==
Plater was an active Protestant who served twenty-eight years as a vestryman of St. Andrew's Episcopal Church (which he helped to found and build).

He was first married to Hannah Lee and their only child was Charlotte (born circa 9/1763; died young). He later married Elizabeth Rousby, and they had six children: Rebecca, George, John, Thomas, Edward, and Ann. Rebecca Plater (born 3/8/1765) married General Uriah Forrest, a statesman and military leader. She was the grandmother of Alice Green, wife of Prince Don Ángel de Iturbide y Huarte of the Imperial House of Mexico, who were in turn the parents of Prince Don Agustín de Iturbide y Green, who was adopted by Mexico’s Habsburg Emperor Maximilian I of Mexico and his consort Carlota of Mexico. George Plater IV (born 9/21/1766 in St. Mary's Co, Maryland, died 4/10/1802 at Sotterley) married Cecelia Brown Bond (on 3/22/1798), and later married Elizabeth Somerville. John Rousby Plater (born 10/15/1767 at Annapolis, Anne Arundel, Maryland) married Elizabeth Tuttle and was a lawyer and judge. Thomas Plater (born 5/5/1769 at Annapolis, Anne Arundel, Maryland) married Ann Lingan and later married Evelina Hite Buchanan. He was a lawyer and would go on to represent Maryland in the United States House of Representatives. Ann Plater (born 9/23/1770 at Sotterley, St. Marys Co, Maryland) married Philip Barton Key. Their daughter Elizabeth Rousby Key was the wife of Louisiana's fifth governor, Henry Johnson and a first cousin to Francis Scott Key. Their son, Philip Barton Key, Jr., served prior to the American Civil War as a member of the Louisiana House of Representatives for Lafourche Parish, Louisiana. He was educated in the law by his cousin Francis Scott Key.

When Plater died on February 10, 1792, in the capital city of Annapolis, Maryland, his body was returned home and buried at Sotterley, on the banks of the Patuxent River in St. Mary's County. At least 93 slaves lived on the plantation at the time of the subject's death. The house is maintained and operated as a museum by a foundation created for that purpose. The property is on Route 245, just outside Hollywood, Maryland, and is open to visitors during the summer.

== Notes ==
Political offices
Preceded by Daniel of St. Thomas Jenifer	President of the Maryland State Senate; 1780–1782	Succeeded by Matthew Tilghman
Preceded by Charles Carroll of Carrollton	President of the Maryland State Senate; 1784	Succeeded by John Smith
Preceded by John Smith	President of the Maryland State Senate; 1785	Succeeded by Daniel Carroll
Preceded by Daniel Carroll	President of the Maryland State Senate; 1786	Succeeded by John Smith
Preceded by Daniel Carroll	President of the Maryland State Senate; 1787–1788	Succeeded by Daniel Carroll
Preceded by John Smith	President of the Maryland State Senate; 1790	Succeeded by William Smallwood
Preceded by John E. Howard	Governor of Maryland; 1791–1792	Succeeded by James Brice; Acting Governor
