= María Nicolasa de Iturbide =

Nicolasa de Iturbide
- Princess of Iturbide
- Born: September 15, 1774; Valladolid, New Spain
- Died: October 4, 1840 (aged 66); Mexico City, Mexico
Names
- Spanish: María Nicolasa de Iturbide y Arambúru
- Imperial House: Iturbide
- Father: José Joaquín de Iturbide y Arreguí
- Mother: María Josefa de Arámburu y Carrillo de Figueroa

María Nicolasa de Iturbide y Arámburu (September 15, 1774 – October 4, 1840) was the older sister of Agustín de Iturbide who received the title of Princess of Iturbide during the First Mexican Empire by the Constituent Congress.

The brigadier Antonio López de Santa Anna pretended the hand of the princess with the idea of becoming a serene Highness, even though he was only 30 years old and she was in her 60s. As soon as the Emperor realized the absurd purpose, he put an end to this activity, which would lead to a revenge by the brigadier.

== Decree ==
The Sovereign Mexican Constituent Congress decreed on June 22, 1822 the following:

- Art 1 °. The Mexican Monarchy, in addition to being moderate and Constitutional, is also hereditary.
- Art 2 °. Consequently, the Nation calls the succession of the Crown for the death of the current Emperor, his firstborn son Don Agustín Jerónimo de Iturbide. The Constitution of the Empire will decide the order of succession of the throne.
- Art 3 °. The crown prince will be called "Prince Imperial" and will have the treatment of Imperial Highness.
- Art 4 °. The legitimate sons and daughters of H.I.M will be called "Mexican Princes", and will have the treatment of Highness.
- Art 5 °. Don José Joaquín de Iturbide y Arreguí, Father of H.I.M, is decorated with the title of "Prince of the Union" and the treatment of Highness, during his life.
- Art 6 °. It is also granted the title of "Princess of Iturbide" and the treatment of Highness, during his life, to Doña María Nicolasa de Iturbide y Arámburo, sister of the Emperor.

== Ancestry ==
16. José Iturbide Mendiondo (1666)
8. Don José Salvador de Iturbide y Irigaray
17. Antonia Irigaray Orduña
4. Don José de Iturbide y Álvarez de Eulate
18. Pedro Alvarez de Eulate
9. Doña Magdalena Álvarez de Eulate y Vicuña
19.
2. Don José Joaquín de Iturbide y Arregui
20.
10.
21.
5. Doña María Josefa de Arregui y Gastelu
22.
11.
23.
1. María Nicolasa de Iturbide y Arambúru
24.
12.
25
6. Don Sebastián de Arambúru y Urdibizar
13.
3. Doña María Josefa de Arambúru y Carrillo de Figueroa
14.
7. Doña Nicolasa Carrillo de Figueroa y Villaseñor
15.
