= Ana María Huarte =

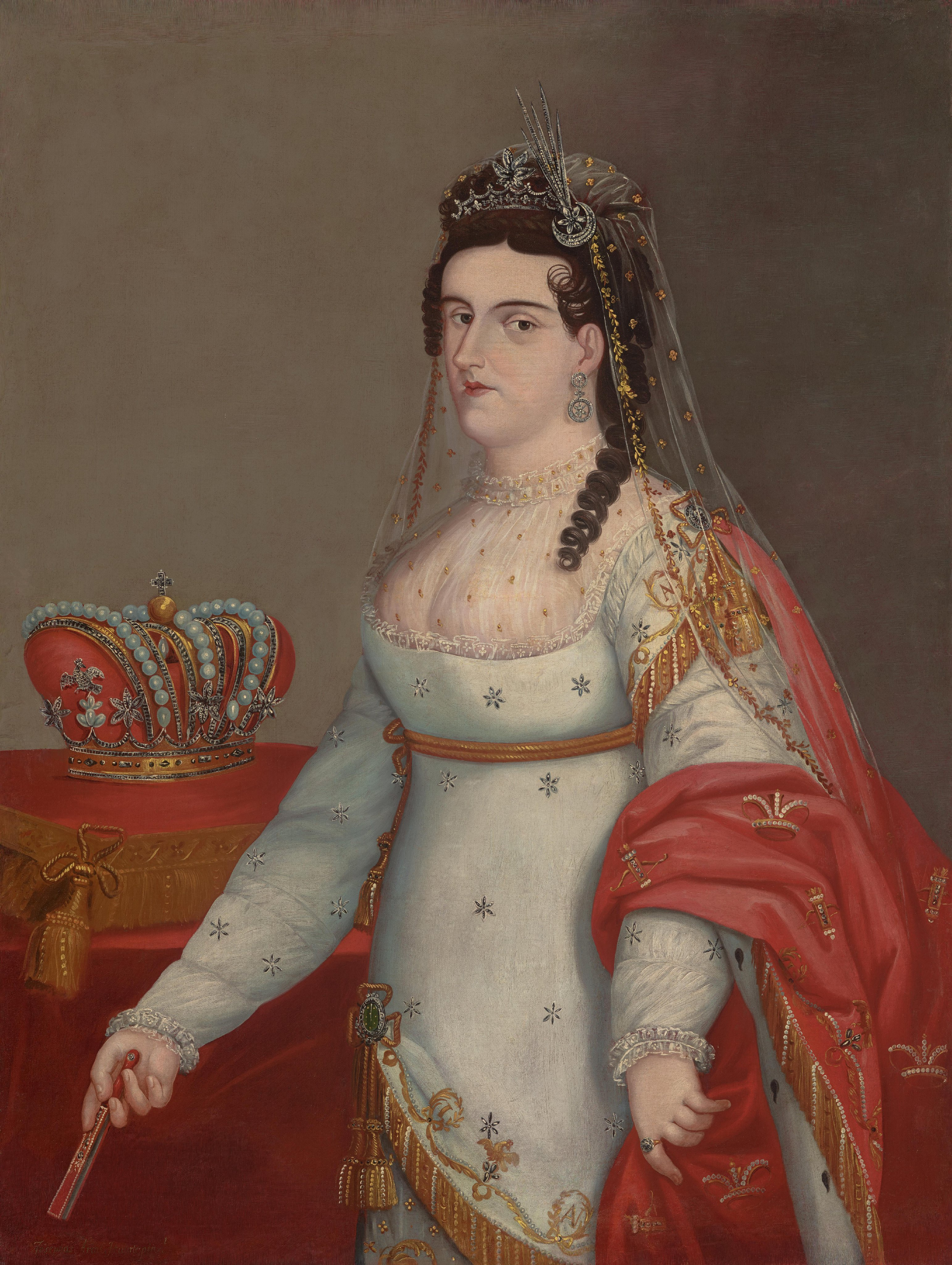
- Ana María at her coronation in 1822

Empress consort of Mexico
- Tenure: 19 May 1822 – 19 March 1823
- Coronation: 21 July 1822
- Born: 17 January 1786; Valladolid, Michoacán, New Spain
- Died: 21 March 1861 (aged 75); Philadelphia, Pennsylvania, United States
- Burial: Roman Catholic Church of St John the Evangelist, Philadelphia, Pennsylvania
- Spouse: Agustín I (m. 1805; died 1824)
- Issue: Agustín Jerónimo, Prince Imperial of Mexico; Princess Sabina; Princess Juana de Dios; Princess Josefa; Prince Ángel; Princess María de Jesús; Princess María de los Dolores; Prince Salvador María; Prince Felipe; Prince Agustín Cosme
Names
- Spanish: Ana María Josefa Ramona Juana Nepomucena Marcelina Huarte y Muñiz
- House: Tagle (by birth); Iturbide (by marriage)
- Father: Isidro Huarte y Arrivillaga
- Mother: Ana Manuela Muñiz y Sánchez de Tagle
- Religion: Roman Catholicism

Ana María Josefa Ramona Juana Nepomucena Marcelina de Huarte Muñiz (17 January 1786 – 21 March 1861) was the first Empress of Mexico. Noted for her beauty, grace and education, she married Agustín de Iturbide, who ruled briefly as Emperor in 1822-23 before he was exiled by the short-lived provisional government. Inspired to return to Mexico to serve the nation as a soldier, he was arrested and executed. The former empress mostly lived out her widowhood in the United States.

== Biography ==
Ana María was born on 17 January 1786 in the Mexican city of Valladolid (present-day Morelia), considered by scholars of that time to be "The Garden of New Spain". Her father was Isidro Huarte (1744–1824), a Navarrese nobleman who in the second half of the 18th century had immigrated from Goizueta for better opportunities, amassed a huge fortune and entered into a successful political career as Intendant of Valladolid de Michoacán. Her mother, Doña Ana Manuela Muñiz y Sánchez de Tagle (1749-1800), became Isidro Huarte's second wife in 1771. Ana Manuela belonged to one of New Spain's richest and most influential families, the House of Tagle, the family of the Marquises of Altamira. One of her great-great-grandfathers was a brother of Don Luis Sánchez de Tagle, 1st Marquis of Altamira. Ana Manuela gave birth to ten children, six boys and four girls: José Antonio (who died in 1852) in 1772, Isidro José (who died in 1843) in 1774, Juan Nepomuceno in 1780, José Ramon in 1781, José Raymundo (who died in infancy) in 1782, María del Carmen (who died in 1808) in 1783, María Teresa in 1784, Ana María (who died in 1861) in 1786, María Josefa (who died shortly after birth) in 1787, and Joaquin José (who died in 1843) in 1790. In addition, Ana Manuela suffered four miscarriages: in 1776, 1778, 1785, and 1789.

Ana María was baptized at Sagrario Metropolitano de Valladolid at the same year she was born. Later, she attended Colegio Santa Rosa María de Valladolid, which was known for its educational and musical excellence. Ana María distinguished herself as an excellent student and was also gifted with musical talents.

Around 1800, Ana María's mother Ana Manuela fell seriously ill and died. Four years later, her father married for the third and last time to Ana Gertrudis Alcántara Arrambide, with whom he fathered five more children: María de los Dolores in 1805, José Manuel in 1807, José Mariano in 1810, María Francisca in 1814 and María Francisca in 1817.

=== Marriage and family ===
Ana María possessed great beauty with features likened to that of the Madonna, although she suffered from a "chronic cough" and recurring fever. She showed gracious, exquisite manners while in Colegio Santa Rosa Maria, and it was in this school where she met the young Agustín de Iturbide. The young Agustín was considered very handsome and came from a very wealthy Basque noble family. Their marriage was considered by many as a perfect match.

On a Friday afternoon, 27 February 1805, at one o'clock, the 19-year-old Ana Maria married the 22-year-old Agustín de Iturbide. Ana Maria arrived in the Cathedral of Valladolid dressed as an Austrian princess, adorned with white lace and fringed combs. Their wedding was a great social event, as women wore their best jewels and sumptuous dresses, while men were dressed in strict formal attire.

Ana María provided a dowry of one hundred thousand pesos, with which the couple bought a hacienda in the town of Maravatío.

Like her mother, Ana María was frequently pregnant, giving birth to ten children in 17 years, of which nine lived to adulthood:

- Agustín Jerónimo de Iturbide y Huarte, Prince Imperial of Mexico (30 September 1807 – 11 December 1866), who fought alongside the liberator Simón Bolívar and became his aide-de-camp. He never married or had any legitimate children, but he did father an illegitimate daughter with Nicolasa Fernández de Pierola, a woman from Arequipa in Peru. The daughter, called Doña Jesusa de Iturbide, would later marry the prominent Peruvian politician (and President of Peru after 1879) Nicolás de Piérola (they were first cousins).
- Sabina de Iturbide y Huarte (30 December 1810 - 14 July 1871), who died unmarried as a nun.
- Juana de Iturbide y Huarte (10 March 1812 – 2 October 1828), who died unmarried as a nun.
- Josefa de Iturbide y Huarte (22 December 1814 – 5 December 1891), who died unmarried as a nun. She was a friend and court lady of Empress Carlota of Mexico and was the last of her siblings to die.
- Ángel de Iturbide y Huarte (2 October 1816 – 21 July 1872), who married Alice Green, a US citizen, with issue. He was the father of Agustín de Iturbide y Green.
- María de Iturbide y Huarte (21 February 1818 – 10 July 1849), who died unmarried as a nun in the United States. She called herself "Mary Isis".
- Dolores de Iturbide y Huarte (1819 – 10 July 1820), who died in early childhood.
- Salvador de Iturbide y Huarte (16 July 1820 – 7 June 1856), who married Rosario Marzán, with issue. He was the father of Salvador de Iturbide y Marzán.
- Felipe de Iturbide y Huarte (30 November 1822 – 19 November 1853), the only son of a Mexican emperor to be born a prince.
- Agustín Cosme de Iturbide y Huarte (October 1824 – 10 May 1873), who died unmarried. He was born in New Orleans and served in the military.

The children were born in various parts of the Mexican territory, always depending on the place where Iturbide was needed for his military position.

=== Empress consort ===
Agustín de Iturbide's coronation was held at the Mexico City Cathedral on 21 July 1822. Ana María was also crowned empress in an elaborate ceremony that was attended by the bishops of Puebla, Guadalajara, Durango and Oaxaca and presided over by Archbishop of Mexico Pedro José de Fonte.

After the coronation, the imperial couple lived at the 18th-century palace of the Marquis of San Mateo Valparaiso, along with the sum of one and half million pesos for expenses. Empress Ana Maria was accompanied by a leading lady, seven ladies-in-waiting, nine honorary ladies, seven ladies of the chamber, ladies in charge of her wardrobe, and a personal doctor, while her children were given guardians, tutors and governesses.

By the time of the coronation, Agustín had half abandoned Ana María, but for political reasons, he had to reconcile with his wife, who was then pregnant with their ninth child. Agustín had a very bad temper and a reputation for being a womanizer. He was fond of attending parties and revelries, where it is said that he met La Güera Rodríguez, who awakened in him a passion that led him to squander most of his fortune. There were rumors that La Güera and Iturbide had an illicit relationship, and they did live across the street from each other in Mexico City, but a written account by Vicente Rocafuerte, one of Iturbide's detractors, claimed in print that he was having an affair with a beautiful aristocratic blond woman "full of charm and talent, bewitching, and endowed with a great genius for intrigue and mischief." For her part, Ana María fell into a deep depression, only finding solace in her children and in food. She was addicted to milk sweets with nuts that made her evoke her childhood memories, her friends and her home in Valladolid. She was also frequently ill during this time, suffering from serious coughing, fainting, and fever.

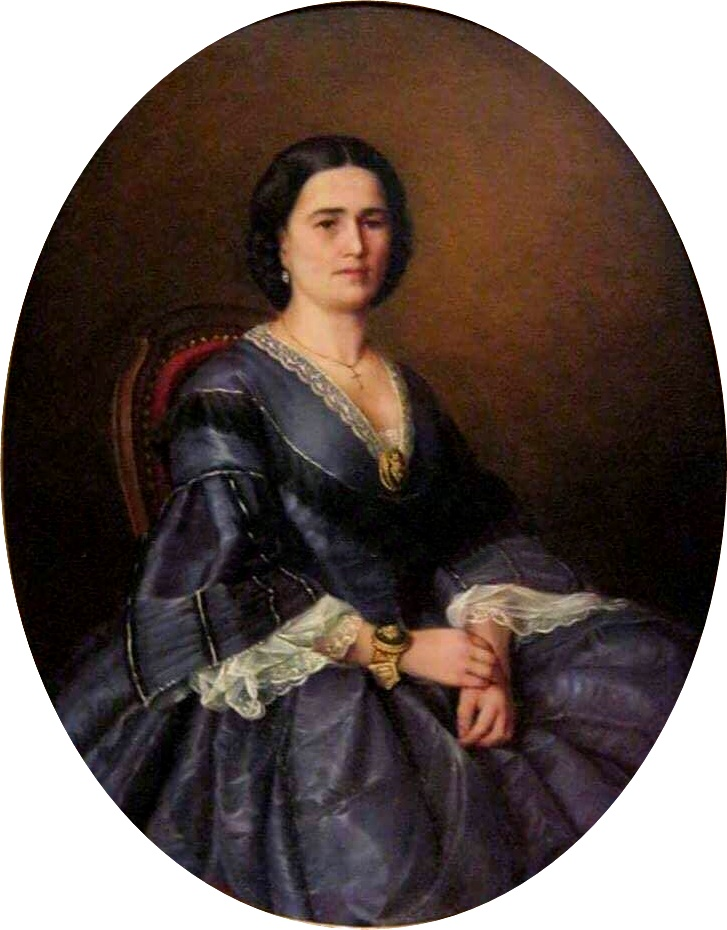
Ana María in exile

When the problems within the Mexican Empire started, the empress and her children took refuge in the convent. She soon joined her husband in exile after he abdicated the throne on 19 March 1823. The imperial family was accompanied by their loyal subjects and was escorted by General Nicolás Bravo. The family sailed on a ship filled with food, wine, jewelry and artwork until they finally reached Italy. Ferdinand III, Grand Duke of Tuscany allowed the imperial family to stay in Livorno, where they rented a small country house, but then, the King of Spain pressured the Grand Duke of Tuscany to expel the imperial family, and so, the empress and her family left for London.

Her husband, the former emperor, continued to receive reports from Mexico as well as advice from supporters that if he returned, he would be hailed as a liberator and a potential leader against the Spanish invasion. Iturbide sent word to Congress in Mexico City on 13 February 1824 offering his services in the event of Spanish attack. Congress never replied. More conservative political factions in Mexico finally convinced Iturbide to return. Accompanied by his wife, two of his children, and a chaplain (Joseph A. Lopez), Agustin de Iturbide landed at the port of Soto la Marina in Mexico on 14 July 1824, where he was arrested and later executed by a firing squad on 19 July 1824. Ana María was pregnant with their youngest child at this time.

The Mexican Congress granted the family an annual pension of 8,000 pesos and allowed the empress and her children to go to Gran Colombia, but there was no ship to take them there. The family instead found a ship sailing to the United States. Ana María gave birth to her tenth and final child in New Orleans. The family later resided in Baltimore and then settled in a small house in Georgetown, just outside Washington. The former empress, along with two of her daughters, were finally settled in Philadelphia, while the other children continued their studies in various places.

In 1847, the Mexican government stopped providing her the pension befitting a former empress. She was received by U.S. President James K. Polk in the White House as she sought help from the U.S. government about her Mexican pension.

Empress Ana María donated several portraits and family memorabilia of the exiled imperial family to a convent, such as a crown of woven material made out of gold and silver. She experienced the pain of losing two of her adult daughters, as well as her sons Salvador and Felipe. The empress never approved of the marriage of her son Angel to Alice Green, the US-American great-granddaughter of George Plater, a Governor of Maryland.

=== Death ===
On the night of Thursday, 21 March 1861, Ana María Josefa Ramona de Huarte de Iturbide y Muñiz, the former Empress of Mexico, died at the age of 75 at her residence in Philadelphia. Ana Maria, who had outlived five of her ten children, was buried in Vault IX in the cemetery at the Catholic Church of St. John the Evangelist, where she had been a parishioner for decades.

The service was very simple. No former associates of this noblewoman, who had been born into one of Mexico’s most aristocratic families and had once wore the Mexican crown, paid their final respects. A few men in Philadelphia, whose high social position had acquainted them with the former imperial family, attended the funeral. Only a few dozen of Philadelphia's residents knew that the old woman laid there to rest had briefly been an empress.

== Decree ==
The Sovereign Mexican Constituent Congress decreed on 22 June 1822 the following:

- Art 1 °. The Mexican Monarchy, in addition to being moderate and Constitutional, is also hereditary.
- Art 2 °. Consequently, the Nation calls the succession of the Crown for the death of the current Emperor, his firstborn son Don Agustín Jerónimo de Iturbide. The Constitution of the Empire will decide the order of succession of the throne.
- Art 3 °. The crown prince will be called "Prince Imperial" and will have the treatment of Imperial Highness.
- Art 4 °. The legitimate sons and daughters of H.I.M will be called "Mexican Princes", and will have the treatment of Highness.
- Art 5 °. Don José Joaquín de Iturbide y Arreguí, Father of H.I.M, is decorated with the title of "Prince of the Union" and the treatment of Highness, during his life.
- Art 6 °. It is also granted the title of "Princess of Iturbide" and the treatment of Highness, during his life, to Doña María Nicolasa de Iturbide y Arámburo, sister of the Emperor.

== Arms ==
Coat of Arms of H.I.M. Ana Huarte de Iturbide as Empress of Mexico

== Ancestry ==
Ancestors of Ana María Huarte

4. Juan Francisco de Huarte e Iriarte
2. Isidro de Huarte y Arrivillaga
10. Jacobo de Arrivillaga y Barrenechea
5. Agustina Antonia de Arrivillaga y Minondo
11. Margarita de Minondo y Huici
1. Ana María de Huarte y Muñiz
12. Antonio Muñiz
6. Manuel Muñiz y Peo
13. Antonia de Peo y Valdés
3. Ana Manuela Muñiz y Sánchez de Tagle
14. Andrés Sánchez de Tagle y Pérez de la Sierra
7. Isabel Sánchez de Tagle y Veydacar
15. María de Veydacar

Mexican royalty
New title	Empress consort of Mexico; 19 May 1822 – 19 March 1823	Vacant Title next held by Charlotte of Belgium
