= Sabina de Iturbide y Huarte =

Mexican politician

- Mexican princess
- Born: 30 December 1810; Valladolid, New Spain
- Died: 15 July 1871 (aged 60); Philadelphia, Pennsylvania, United States
- Burial: Church of St John the Evangelist
Names
- Spanish: Sabina María de la Concepción de Iturbide y Huarte
- Imperial House: Iturbide
- Father: Agustín I of Mexico
- Mother: Ana María Huarte

Styles of Sabina de Iturbide y Huarte
- Reference style: Her Highness
- Spoken style: Your Highness

Sabina de Iturbide y Huarte (30 December 1810 — 15 July 1871) was the daughter of Agustín de Iturbide and Ana María Huarte who received the title of Mexican Princess during the First Mexican Empire by the Constituent Congress.

She was the eldest daughter of Agustín de Iturbide and Ana María de Huarte y Muñiz. She was given the title of Mexican princess when her father was elected as the Mexican Emperor. She given the style of Highness, as the style of Imperial Highness was reserved for only the Prince Imperial of Mexico, the heir apparent to the throne. This position was held by her brother Agustín Jerónimo de Iturbide y Huarte.

== Decree ==
The Sovereign Mexican Constituent Congress decreed on June 22, 1822 the following:

- Art 1 °. The Mexican Monarchy, in addition to being moderate and Constitutional, is also hereditary.
- Art 2 °. Consequently, the Nation calls the succession of the Crown for the death of the current Emperor, his firstborn son Don Agustín Jerónimo de Iturbide. The Constitution of the Empire will decide the order of succession of the throne.
- Art 3 °. The crown prince will be called "Prince Imperial" and will have the treatment of Imperial Highness.
- Art 4 °. The legitimate sons and daughters of H.I.M will be called "Mexican Princes", and will have the treatment of Highness.
- Art 5 °. Don José Joaquín de Iturbide y Arreguí, Father of H.I.M, is decorated with the title of "Prince of the Union" and the treatment of Highness, during his life.
- Art 6 °. It is also granted the title of "Princess of Iturbide" and the treatment of Highness, during his life, to Doña María Nicolasa de Iturbide y Arámburo, sister of the Emperor.

== Ancestry ==
Ancestors of Sabina de Iturbide y Huarte

16. Salvador José de Iturbide y Irigarya
8. Jose de Iturbide y Alvarez de Eulate
17. Magdalena Álvarez de Eulate y Vicuña
4. José Joaquín de Iturbide y Arregui
18. José de Arregui
9. María Josefa de Arregui y Gastelu
19. Josefa de Gastelu
2. Agustín de Iturbide y Aramburu
10. Sebastián de Arámburu y Urdizibar
5. María Josefa de Arámburu y Carillo de Figueroa
11. Micaela Nicolasa Carillo de Figueroa y Villaseñor
1. Sabina de Iturbide y Huarte
12. Juan Francisco de Huarte e Iriarte
6. Isidro de Huarte y Arrivillaga
26. Jacobo de Arrivillaga y Barrenechea
13. Agustina Antonia de Arrivillaga y Minondo
27. Margarita de Minondo y Huici
3. Ana María de Huarte y Muñiz
28. Antonio Muñiz
14. Manuel Muñiz y Peo
29. Antonia de Peo y Valdés
7. Ana Manuela Muñiz y Sanchez de Tagle
30. Andrés Sánchez de Tagle y Pérez de la Sierra
15. Isabel Sánchez de Tagle y Veydacar
31. María de Veydacar
