= Felipe de Iturbide y Huarte =

Mexican prince (b. 1822, d. 1853)

Felipe de Iturbide
- Mexican Prince
- Born: November 30, 1822; Mexico City, Mexico
- Died: November 19, 1853 (aged 30); Matamoros, Tamaulipas
Names
- Spanish: Felipe de Jesús Andres María Guadalupe de Iturbide y Huarte
- House: Iturbide
- Father: Agustín I of Mexico
- Mother: Ana María Huarte

Felipe de Jesús Andres María Guadalupe de Iturbide y Huarte (November 30, 1822 — November 19, 1853) was a nineteenth century Mexican royal. He was bestowed the title of Mexican Prince during the First Mexican Empire by the Constituent Congress.

== Early life ==
He was a son of Agustín de Iturbide and Ana María Huarte.

== Decree ==
The Sovereign Mexican Constituent Congress decreed on June 22, 1822 that:

- Art 1 °. The Mexican Monarchy, is hereditary in addition to moderate and Constitutional.
- Art 2 °. Consequently, the Nation calls the succession of the Crown for the death of the current Emperor, his firstborn son Don Agustín Jerónimo de Iturbide. The Constitution of the Empire decide the order of succession.
- Art 3 °. The crown prince is called "Prince Imperial" and is treated as Imperial Highness.
- Art 4 °. The legitimate sons and daughters of H.I.M will be called "Mexican Princes", and will be treated as Highness.
- Art 5 °. Don José Joaquín de Iturbide y Arreguí, Father of H.I.M, was bestowed the title of "Prince of the Union" and treatment as Highness,.
- Art 6 °. It granted the title "Princess of Iturbide" and treatment as Highness to Doña María Nicolasa de Iturbide y Arámburo, sister of the Emperor.

== Treaty of Limits Between Mexico and the United States ==
Felipe de Iturbide was an interpreter and translator of the Mexican Commission of Borders Matamoros Section of the peace treaty signed on February 2, 1848, that was called Treaty of Peace, Friendship, Limits and Settlement between the United States of America and the Mexican Republic. This document specified the border between the two countries, which included the loss to Mexico of more than half of its territory, which would be added to the United States.

The Mexican Commission of Borders was integrated by:

=== First Stage ===
Name	Function
Pedro García Conde	Commissioner
José Salazar Ilarregui	Surveyor
Francisco Jiménez	Engineer First class
Francisco Martínez de Chavero	Secretary of the Commission
Ricardo Ramírez; Agustín García Conde	Engineers Second class
Felipe de Iturbide	Interpreter and translator

=== Second Stage ===
Name	Function
Pedro García Conde	Commissioner
José Salazar Ilarregui	Surveyor
Francisco Jiménez; Agustín García Conde	Engineers First class
Francisco Martínez de Chavero	Secretary of the Commission
Ricardo Ramírez; Juan B. Espejo	Engineers Second class
Felipe de Iturbide	Interpreter and translator
Agustín Díaz	Surveyor
Manuel Fernández; Miguel Iglesias; Ignacio Molina; Manuel Alemán; Luis Díaz; Antonio Contreras	Engineers Third class

== Ancestry ==
Ancestors of Felipe de Iturbide y Huarte

16. Salvador José de Iturbide y Irigarya
8. Jose de Iturbide y Alvarez de Eulate
17. Magdalena Álvarez de Eulate y Vicuña
4. José Joaquín de Iturbide y Arregui
18. José de Arregui
9. María Josefa de Arregui y Gastelu
19. Josefa de Gastelu
2. Agustín de Iturbide y Aramburu
10. Sebastián de Arámburu y Urdizibar
5. María Josefa de Arámburu y Carillo de Figueroa
11. Micaela Nicolasa Carillo de Figueroa y Villaseñor
1. Felipe de Iturbide y Huarte
12. Juan Francisco de Huarte e Iriarte
6. Isidro de Huarte y Arrivillaga
26. Jacobo de Arrivillaga y Barrenechea
13. Agustina Antonia de Arrivillaga y Minondo
27. Margarita de Minondo y Huici
3. Ana María de Huarte y Muñiz
28. Antonio Muñiz
14. Manuel Muñiz y Peo
29. Antonia de Peo y Valdés
7. Ana Manuela Muñiz y Sanchez de Tagle
30. Andrés Sánchez de Tagle y Pérez de la Sierra
15. Isabel Sánchez de Tagle y Veydacar
31. María de Veydacar
