= List of empresses consort of Mexico =

Coat of arms of the House of Iturbide

Coat of arms of the House of Habsburg-Lorraine

== Empress consort of Mexico ==
=== House of Iturbide (1822–1823) ===
Picture	Name	Father	Birth	Marriage	Became Empress	Coronation	Ceased to be Empress	Death	Spouse
	Ana María Huarte	Isidro de Huarte y Arrivillaga	17 January 1786; Morelia, Michoacán, Mexico	27 February 1805; Valladolid Cathedral	19 May 1822 husband's accession	21 July 1822 at Catedral Metropolitana	19 March 1823 husband's desposition	21 March 1861; Philadelphia, Pennsylvania, United States	Agustín I

=== House of Habsburg-Lorraine (1864–1867) ===
Picture	Name	Father	Birth	Marriage	Became Empress	Coronation	Ceased to be Empress	Death	Spouse
	Charlotte of Belgium	Leopold I of Belgium (Saxe-Coburg and Gotha)	7 June 1840; Palace of Laeken	27 July 1857; Royal Palace of Brussels	10 April 1864 at Catedral Metropolitana		15 May 1867 husband's desposition	19 January 1927; Bouchout Castle	Maximiliano I

== See also ==
- First Lady of Mexico
