= Mikosdpuszta =

Coordinates: 47.0294°N 17.0007°E

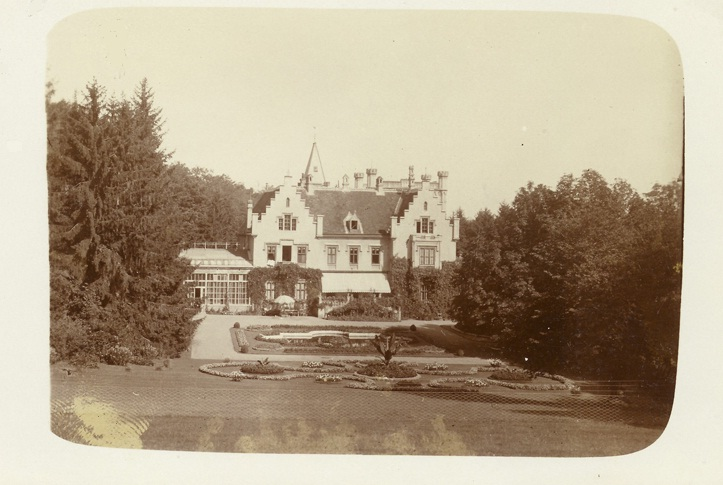
Mikosdpuszta around the end of the 19th century

Mikosdpuszta is the former family estate and mansion of the Mikos family near the village of Mikosszéplak in Vas County, Hungary. It is one of the most important Gothic Revival mansions in Transdanubia.

== History ==
Mikosdpuszta was established by Baron Ede Mikos de Taródháza between 1857 and 1866. The former name of the area was Belső-Soreke. The mansion was built in the middle of an old oak forest, on top of a small artificial mound. It was built in English Gothic Revival style with many turrets and gables. Mikosdpuszta was a modern family home with its own electricity works, central heating and plumbing. A Gothic chapel and a palm house was added later to the main building. A picturesque landscape garden was laid out around the mansion on 284 acres (1.15 km^{2}) with two artificial lakes, many pavilions, a vineyard and stables.

In 1871, the younger daughter of the Baron, Gizella Mikos married Salvador de Itúrbide y de Marzán, the Pretender to the Imperial Throne of Mexico in Mikosdpuszta. The pair lived in the mansion until 1881.

Baron Ede Mikos exheredated his son, János Mikos because of his prodigal lifestyle. After his death in 1873 the estate was inherited by his daughters, Olga and Gizella. The family feud ended in 1876 with an agreement. The estate was inherited by the legal heir, Baron János Mikos while his sisters received a life annuity.

Baron János Mikos was an eccentric figure who wrote a play about the infamous Hungarian robber Jóska Sobri and established the first Hungarian sci-fi magazine under the title Rejtelmes Világ (Mysterious World).

The baron went bankrupt in 1881 and he had to sell the estate. Mikosdpuszta was bought by a Viennese banker, Vilmos Zierer, in 1891. Zierer established a model farm on the estate with the first modern irrigation system in Transdanubia and he was successful in the selective breeding of potatoes.

The mansion remained in the ownership of the Zierer family until 1945. It was furnished with antiquities, old paintings, wall panelling, stained glass windows, Venetian mirrors and Meissen porcelain. The most important rooms were the lobby, billiard room, smoking room, ball room, great dining room, small dining room, study and the library.

Mikosdpuszta was occupied by the Red Army between 1945 and 1946. The precious furniture was totally destroyed. After the nationalization it became an education centre of the Hungarian Working People's Party. In 1956 it became a holiday resort for children. The mansion was partially rebuilt and its outbuildings were demolished.

In 1995 Mikosdpuszta was bought by a private owner, Hartmuth Hess, a German businessman who had made some repair works in the park and the outbuildings but sold the castle three years later. Mikosdpuszta changed hands many times in the next years between obscure companies that let the building falling in total disrepair. Although it is listed national monument, the mansion and the park are in decaying state. The carved wooden ceiling and the Gothic cupboards in the dining room survived the destruction.

== Sources ==
- Zsolt Virág: Magyar kastélylexikon. Vas megye kastélyai és kúriái, Bp.: 2004, pp. 160–163
