= Salvador de Iturbide y Marzán =

Salvador de Iturbide
- Prince of Iturbide
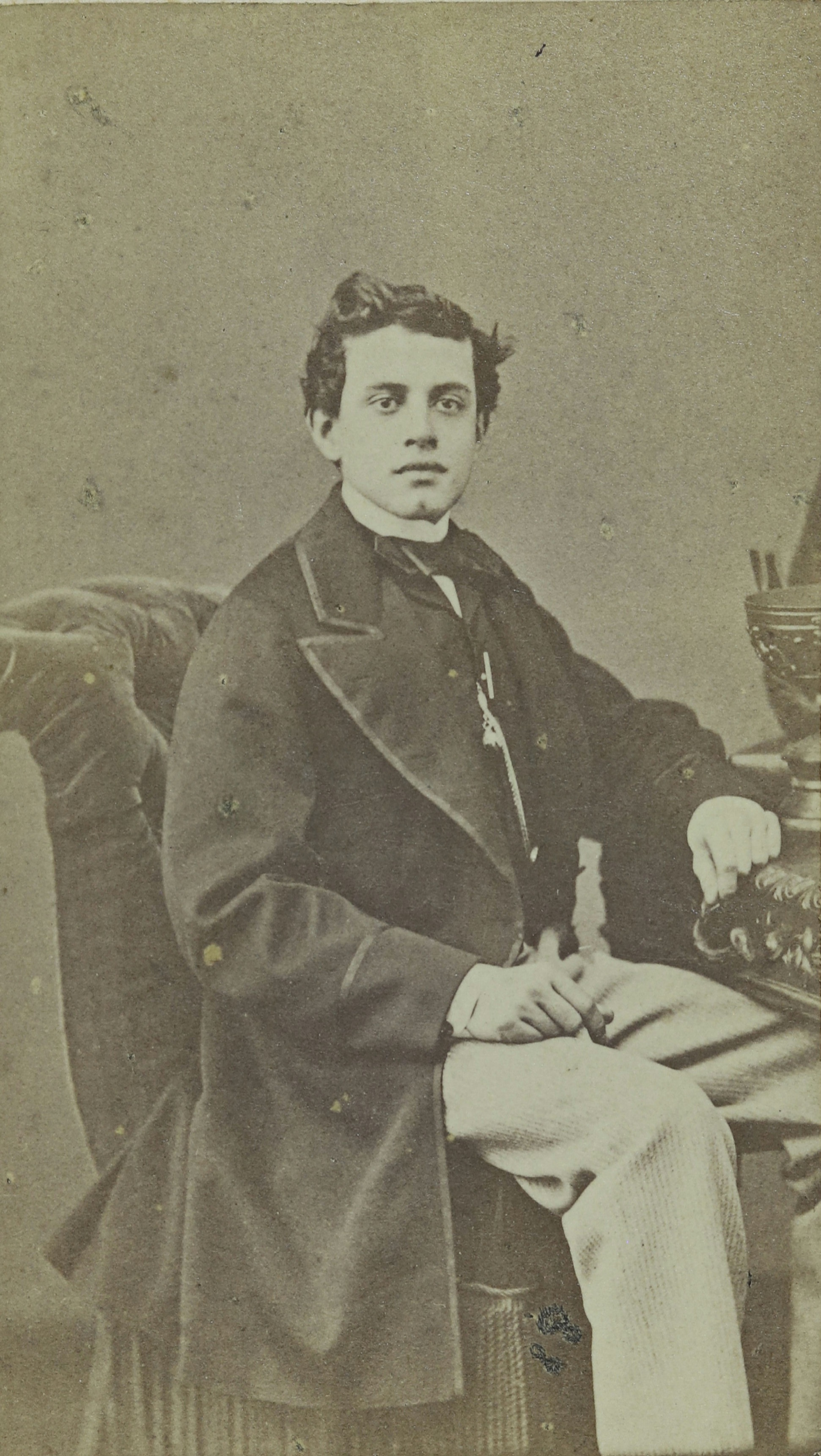
- Born: 28 September 1849; Mexico City, Mexican Republic
- Died: 26 February 1895 (aged 45); Ajaccio, Corsica, French Third Republic
- Spouse: Baroness Gizella Mikos de Taródháza
- Issue: Maria Josepha Sophia; María Gizella Anna; María Teresa
Names
- Spanish: Salvador Agustín Francisco de Paula de Iturbide y Marzán
- House: Iturbide
- Father: Prince Salvador of Mexico
- Mother: María del Rosario de Marzán y Guisasola

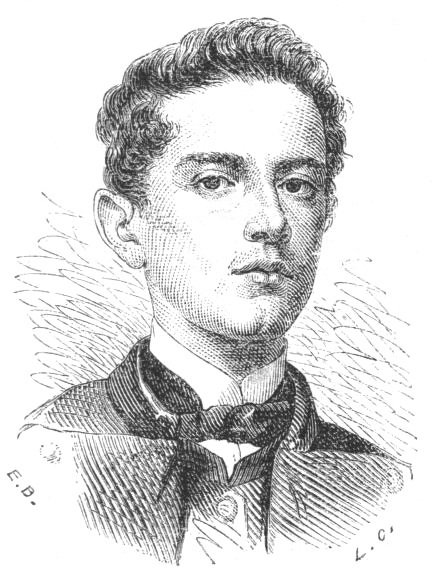
Salvador de Iturbide. Engraving in Le Monde illustré, 16 December 1865.

Salvador Agustín Francisco de Paula de Iturbide y Marzán (18 September 1849 – 26 February 1895) was the grandson of Agustín de Iturbide, the first emperor of independent Mexico, and his wife Empress Ana María. He became the adopted son, along with his cousin Agustín de Iturbide y Green, of Mexico's only other imperial couple—Emperor Maximilian I and Empress Carlota.

== Biography ==
=== Family ===
Salvador de Iturbide y Marzán, born into the Mexican nobility, was the son of Emperor Agustin I's third son Prince Salvador of Mexico and Rosario de Marzán y Guisasola.

When Maximilian ascended the throne of Mexico in 1863 with the support of the French troops of Napoleon III, he invited the Iturbide family back to Mexico. As it became clear that Maximilian and Carlota could have no children together, they offered to adopt Salvador along with his cousin, Agustín de Iturbide y Green. They formally adopted the cousins and granted them the title Prince de Iturbide and style of Highness by imperial decree on 16 September 1865. Salvador and his cousin were ranked after the reigning family. However, some historians debate whether Maximilian intended to give the crown to the Iturbides, and if it was a pretense directed at his brother Archduke Karl Ludwig of Austria; as Maximilian explained himself: either Karl would give him one of his sons as an heir, or else he would bequeath everything to the Iturbide children.

His adoptive mother, Empress Carlota, sent him to France, where he lived at Paris until 1867, when he moved to Hungary. After seeking the right to a pension as an heir to the Mexican throne, he was awarded one by the Emperor Franz Joseph, Emperor Maximilian's brother; Don Salvador regularly petitioned to have it increased.

=== Marriage ===
In Vienna, Itúrbide became the friend of a young Hungarian aristocrat, Baron Gyula Gáspár Mikos de Taródhaza who had just returned from a long trip through South America. Itúrbide was invited to the Mikos family estate in Mikosdpuszta, where he was introduced to Baroness Gizella Mikos de Taródhaza. On 21 June 1871, Don Salvador and Baroness Gizela were married at the Mikosdpuszta mansion. They had a daughter, Maria Josepha Sophia de Iturbide.

Following the marriage the pair lived in Mikosdpuszta, but the owner of the estate, Baron János Mikos, sold the castle in 1881. Itúrbide and his wife moved to Venice and lived in a palace, rented to Count Zeno. In this place, he became a close friend of Carlos, Duke of Madrid, the Carlist pretender to the Spanish throne.

=== Death ===
He was a member of the Order of the Grand Cross of Our Lady of Guadalupe and awarded with the Personal Order of Charles (the Duke of Madrid).

While visiting Corsica, he became sick and died of a ruptured appendix.

== Decree ==
The Emperor Maximilian of Habsburg decreed on September 16, 1865 the following:

- Art 1 °. The title of "Princes of Iturbide" is awarded to Don Agustín de Iturbide and Don Salvador de Iturbide, grandsons of the Emperor Agustín de Iturbide, as well as his daughter Doña Josefa de Iturbide.
- Art 2 °. The Princes mentioned in the previous article, will have the treatment of Highness, and will take rank after the reigning family.
- Art 3 °. This title is not hereditary, and in the event that the mentioned princes had legitimate succession, the reigning Emperor or the Regency will reserve the faculty to grant the expressed title, in each case, to that or those of his successors that they deem convenient.
- Art 4 °. By virtue of the arrangements made with the members of the Iturbide family, the Emperor takes the guardianship and curatorship of the aforementioned princes Agustín and Salvador de Iturbide, appointing as co-tutor the Princess Josefa de Iturbide.
- Art 5 °. The coat of arms used by the aforementioned princes, will be the ancient of his family, with mantle and crown of Prince, and having as support the two rampant wolves of the same shield of his family, granting them by special grace the use of the National Shield in the center of the aforementioned blazon, according to the design that is attached.
- Art 6 °. The Princes of Iturbide will have the right to wear the national badge without a flame, and the button with its crown of Prince.

== Ancestry ==
Ancestors of Salvador de Iturbide y Marzán

8. José Joaquín de Iturbide y Arregui
4. Agustín I of Mexico
9. María Josefa de Arámburu y Carrillo de Figueroa
2. Prince Salvador of Mexico
10. Isidro de Huarte y Arrivillaga
5. Ana María de Huarte y Muñiz
11. Ana Manuela Muñiz y Sánchez de Tagle
1. Prince Salvador de Iturbide
6. José de Marzán y Garnasín
3. María del Rosario de Marzan y Guisasola
14. Juan de Guisasola
7. Petronila de Guisasola y Betancourt
15. Petronila Betancourt
