= Agustín de Iturbide y Green =

Agustín de Iturbide
- Prince of Iturbide
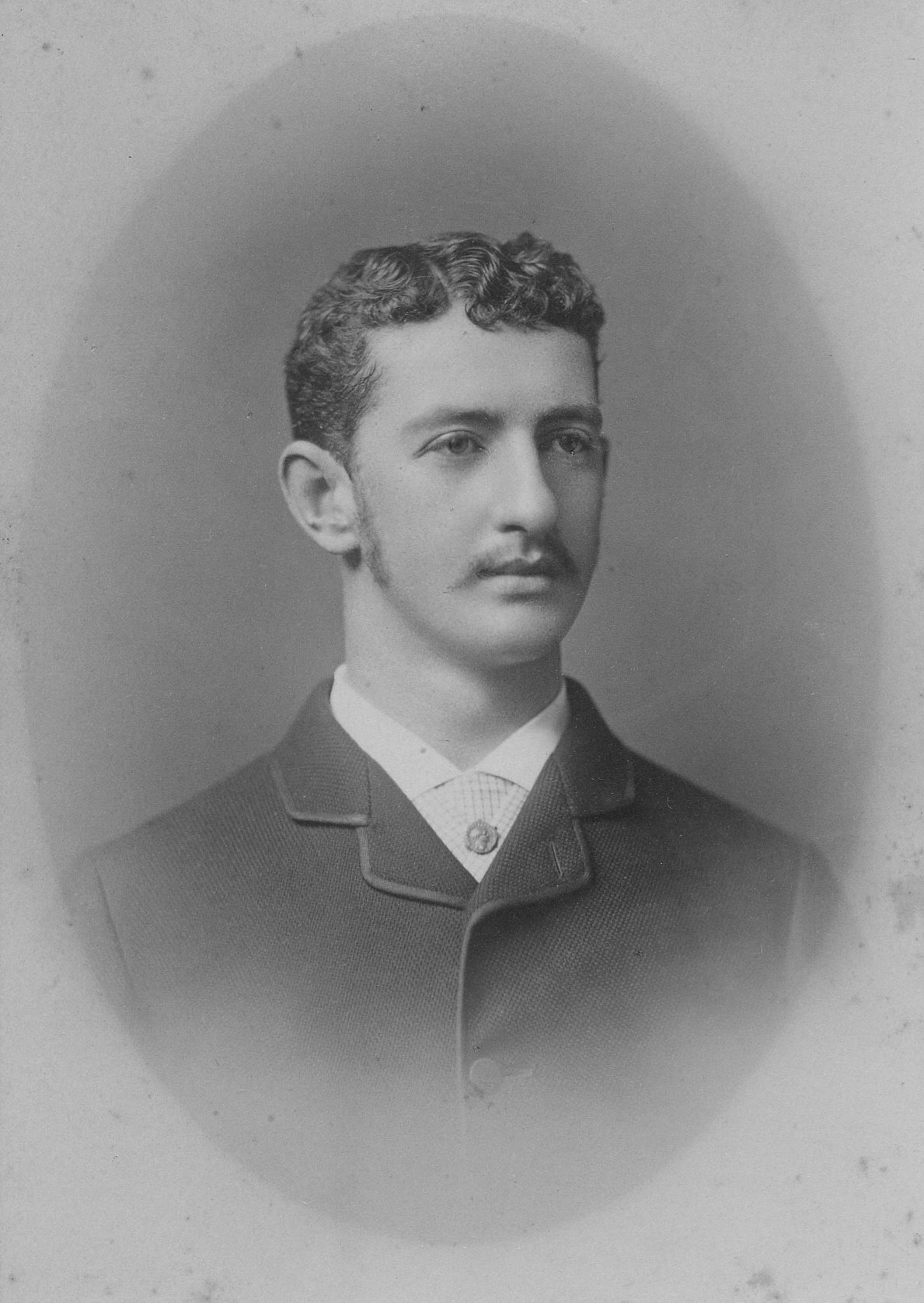
- 1884 portrait

Head of the Imperial House of Mexico
- Tenure: 19 June 1867 – 3 March 1925
- Predecessor: Maximilian I (as Emperor); Agustín Jerónimo de Iturbide (as Head of the House of Iturbide)
- Successor: María Josefa Sofía de Iturbide
- Born: 2 April 1863; Mexico City, Mexico
- Died: 3 March 1925 (aged 61); Washington, D.C., United States
- Burial: Roman Catholic Church of St John the Evangelist, Philadelphia, Pennsylvania, United States
- Spouse: Lucy Eleanor Jackson (m. 1894) Mary Louise Kearney (m. 1915)
Names
- Spanish: Agustín de Iturbide y Green
- House: Iturbide
- Father: Ángel de Iturbide y Huarte
- Mother: Alice Green Forrest
- Religion: Roman Catholicism

Agustín de Iturbide y Green (2 April 1863 – 3 March 1925) was the grandson of Agustín de Iturbide, the first emperor of independent Mexico, and his consort Ana María Huarte.

In April 1864, Maximilian I of Mexico renounced all his incidental Austrian succession rights and later adopted Agustín de Iturbide y Green and Salvador de Iturbide y Marzán, two grandsons of Emperor Agustín I whom he appointed Prince of Iturbide and at the same time heir apparent. Iturbide's claim passed to Maria Josepha Sophia de Iturbide, the daughter of his cousin, Salvador.

== Family ==
Iturbide was the son of Emperor Agustin's second son, Prince Don Ángel María de Iturbide y Huarte (2 October 1816 – 21 July 1872). His mother was Alice Green (c. 1836–1892), daughter of Captain John Nathaniel Green, granddaughter of United States congressman and Revolutionary War General Uriah Forrest, and great-granddaughter of George Plater, Governor of Maryland.

== Possible Mexican royal heir ==
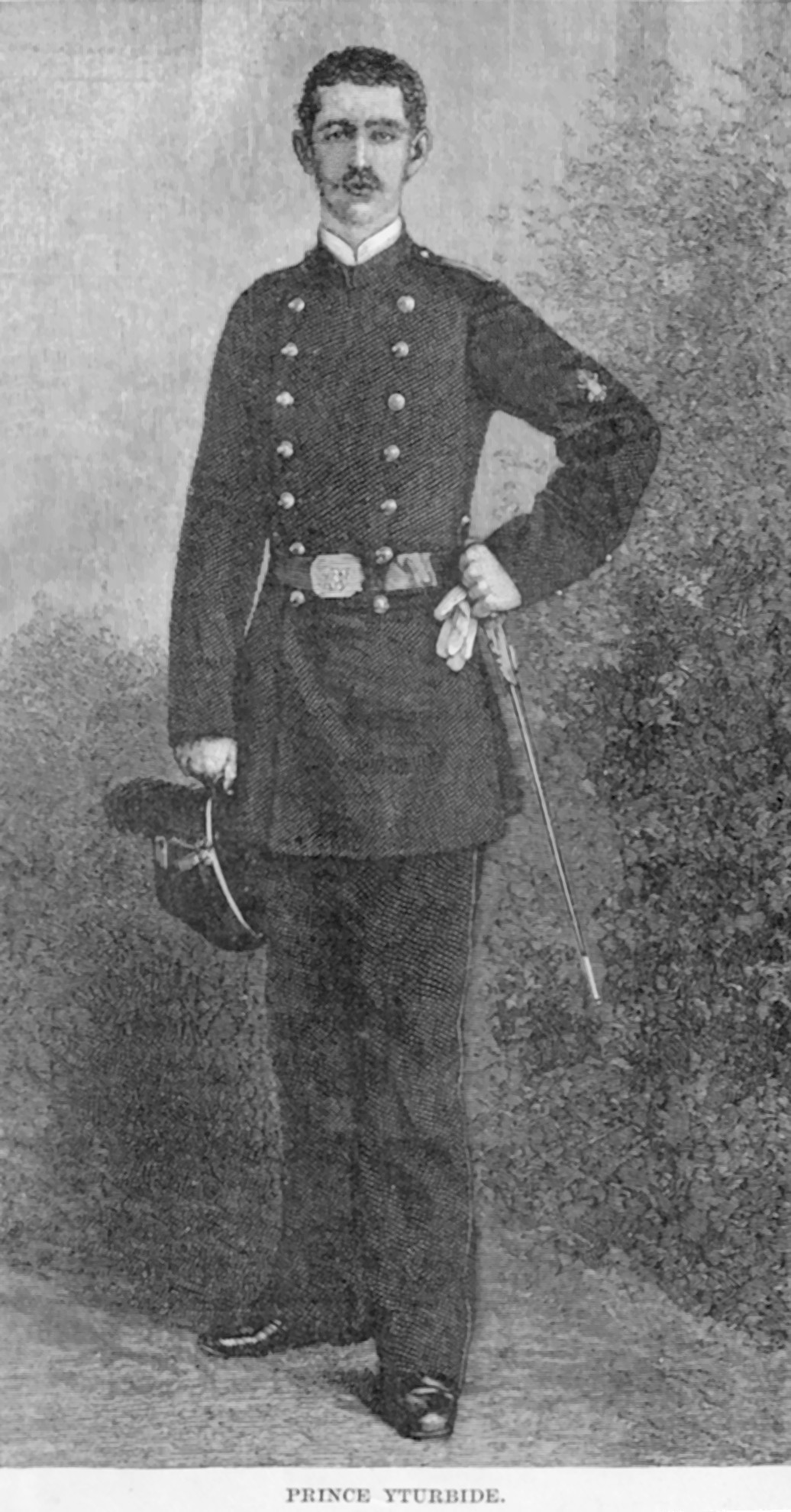
Iturbide in 1888

When Maximilian and Carlota ascended the throne of Mexico in 1863 with the support of the French troops of Napoleon III, the childless new monarchs invited the Iturbide family back to Mexico. As it was clear several years into their marriage that Maximilian and Carlota could have no children together, they offered to adopt Iturbide, which was agreed to with enthusiasm by his father and reluctance by his mother. Iturbide and his cousin were granted the vitalicio (meaning non-hereditary) title of Prince de Iturbide and style of Highness by imperial decree of 16 September 1865 and were ranked after the reigning family. Apparently, the royal couple intended to groom Agustín as heir to the throne. Maximilian never really intended to give the crown to the Iturbides because he believed that they were not of royal blood. It was all a charade directed at his younger brother Archduke Karl Ludwig of Austria, as Maximilian explained himself: either Karl would give him one of his sons as an heir, or else he would bequeath everything to the Iturbide children.

== Post-monarchy ==
With the overthrow of the Second Mexican Empire in 1867, Iturbide's biological parents took him first to England and then back to the United States, where they settled in Washington, DC. When he came of age, Iturbide, who had graduated from Georgetown University, renounced his claim to the throne and title and returned to Mexico. He then served as an officer in the Mexican army. But in 1890, after publishing articles critical of President Porfirio Díaz, he was arrested on charges of sedition and sentenced to fourteen months of imprisonment. After release from prison, Iturbide was sent into exile, where he had two severe nervous breakdowns that resulted in his believing that he would be assassinated. Eventually, he returned to Georgetown University, as a professor of the Spanish and French languages.

For some years before his marriage, Iturbide lived at a monastery near Washington, DC.

== Marriage ==
In 1894, he married Lucy Eleanor Jackson (1 January 1862 – 11 May 1940), daughter of the Rev. William Jackson, by his wife Lucy Catherine Hatchett, of Yealmpton, Devon, United Kingdom. She died in Epsom, Surrey, United Kingdom.

On 5 July 1915, he married Mary Louise Kearney (25 September 1872 – September 1967), a D.C.-born granddaughter of Brigadier General James Kearney of the United States Army.

== Death ==
Agustín de Iturbide y Green died on 3 March 1925 in Washington, D.C. after following a serious nervous and physical breakdown. He was buried at the Church of St John the Evangelist, in Philadelphia, Pennsylvania — alongside his paternal grandmother, Empress Ana María of Mexico.

== In popular culture ==
Mickey Kuhn portrayed De Iturbide y Green in Juarez (1939).

Agustín de Iturbide y Green House of Iturbide
Titles in pretence
Preceded by Emperor Maximiliano I	— TITULAR — Emperor of Mexico; 19 June 1867 – 3 March 1925; Reason for succession failure: Empire abolished in 1867	Succeeded by María I
