= Prince of Iturbide =

Prince de Iturbide was the title originally created as Princess of Iturbide on June 22, 1822, by the Mexican Constituent Congress, to be granted to the older sister of Emperor Agustín de Iturbide. Upon the arrival of Maximilian of Habsburg, he again decreed the titles of Prince and Princess of Iturbide for the daughter who was still alive and the two grandchildren of Agustín de Iturbide.

== Decree I ==
The Sovereign Mexican Constituent Congress decreed on June 22, 1822 the following:

- Art 1 °. The Mexican Monarchy, in addition to being moderate and Constitutional, is also hereditary.
- Art 2 °. Consequently, the Nation calls the succession of the Crown for the death of the current Emperor, his firstborn son Don Agustín Jerónimo de Iturbide. The Constitution of the Empire will decide the order of succession of the throne.
- Art 3 °. The crown prince will be called "Prince Imperial" and will have the treatment of Imperial Highness.
- Art 4 °. The legitimate sons and daughters of H.I.M will be called "Mexican Princes", and will have the treatment of Highness.
- Art 5 °. Don José Joaquín de Iturbide y Arreguí, Father of H.I.M, is decorated with the title of "Prince of the Union" and the treatment of Highness, during his life.
- Art 6 °. It is also granted the title of "Princess of Iturbide" and the treatment of Highness, during her life, to Doña María Nicolasa de Iturbide y Arámburo, sister of the Emperor.

== Decree II ==
The Emperor Maximilian of Habsburg decreed on September 16, 1865 the following:

- Art 1 °. The title of "Princes of Iturbide" is awarded to Don Agustín de Iturbide and Don Salvador de Iturbide, grandsons of the Emperor Agustín de Iturbide, as well as his daughter Doña Josefa de Iturbide.
- Art 2 °. The Princes mentioned in the previous article, will have the treatment of Highness, and will take rank after the reigning family.
- Art 3 °. This title is not hereditary, and in the event that the mentioned princes had legitimate succession, the reigning Emperor or the Regency will reserve the faculty to grant the expressed title, in each case, to that or those of his successors that they deem convenient.
- Art 4 °. By virtue of the arrangements made with the members of the Iturbide family, the Emperor takes the guardianship and curatorship of the aforementioned princes Agustín and Salvador de Iturbide, appointing as co-tutor the Princess Josefa de Iturbide.
- Art 5 °. The coat of arms used by the aforementioned princes, will be the ancient of his family, with mantle and crown of Prince, and having as support the two rampant wolves of the same shield of his family, granting them by special grace the use of the National Shield in the center of the aforementioned blazon, according to the design that is attached.
- Art 6 °. The Princes of Iturbide will have the right to wear the national badge without a flame, and the button with its crown of Prince.

== List ==
Image	Coat of arms	Name	Description
H.I.M Agustín I (Constitutional Emperor of Mexico since May 19, 1822 to March 19, 1823)
		H.H María Nicolasa de Iturbide y Arambúru	June 22, 1822 – March 19, 1823
H.I.M Maximilian I (Emperor of Mexico since April 10, 1864 to May 15, 1867)
		H.H Josefa de Iturbide y Huarte (Mexican Princess 1822–1823)	September 16, 1865 – May 15, 1867
		H.H Agustín de Iturbide y Green	September 16, 1865 – May 15, 1867
		H.H Salvador de Iturbide y Marzán	September 16, 1865 – May 15, 1867
