= St. John the Evangelist Catholic Church (Philadelphia) =

Parish, former Roman Catholic cathedral in Philadelphia

Coordinates: 39.951293°N 75.161276°W

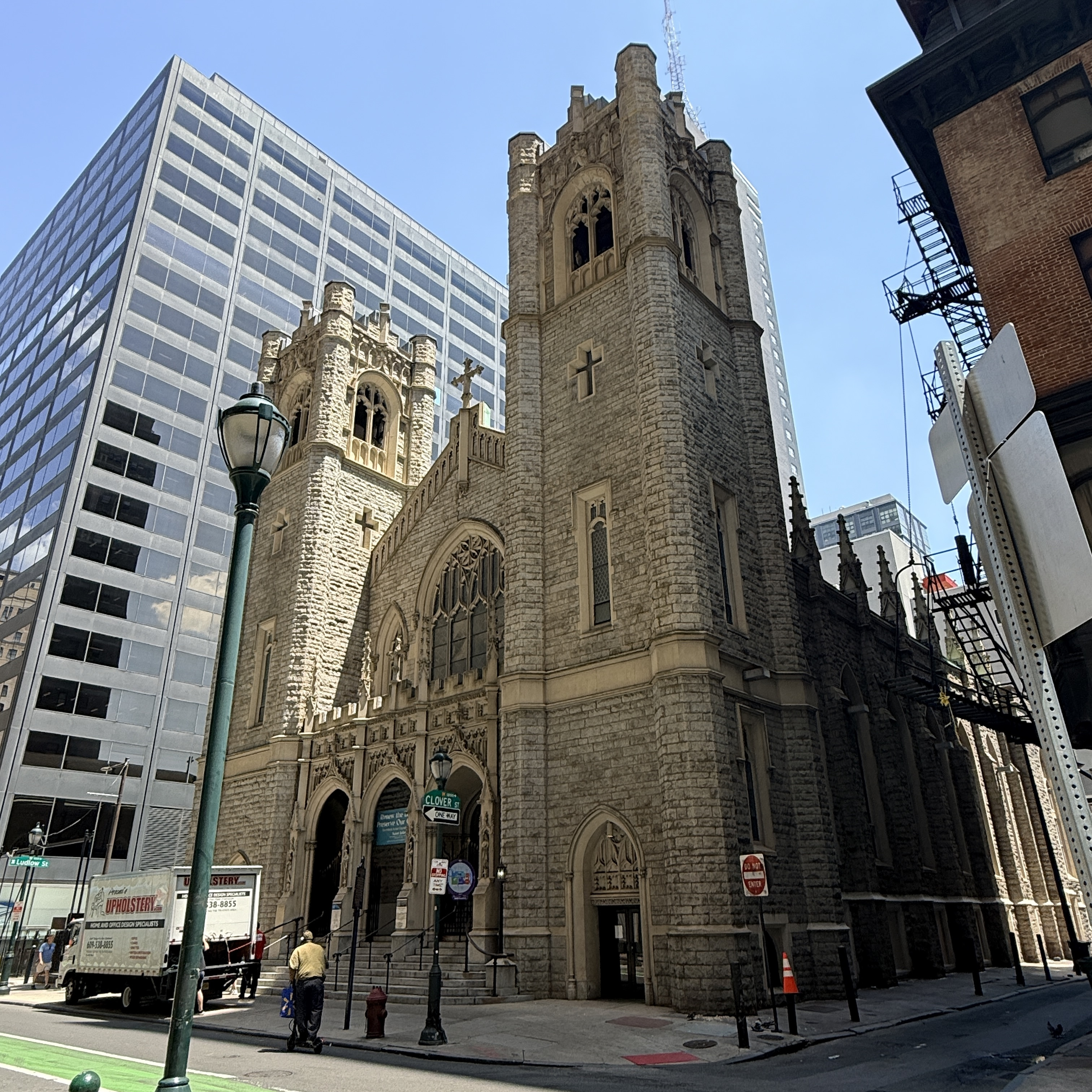
St. John the Evangelist Catholic Church, Philadelphia, Pennsylvania

St. John the Evangelist Church is a parish of the Roman Catholic Church in Center City, Philadelphia, within the Archdiocese of Philadelphia. From 1838 to 1864 it served as the cathedral for the diocese. The historic Gothic Revival parish church, completed in 1832, is located just south of Market Street on 13th Street, a little more than a block from Philadelphia City Hall.

Since 1991, it has been staffed by the Capuchins, a Franciscan order, though for most of its history it was served by diocesan priests. The current pastor is Father Thomas Betz, OFM Cap.

== Activities ==
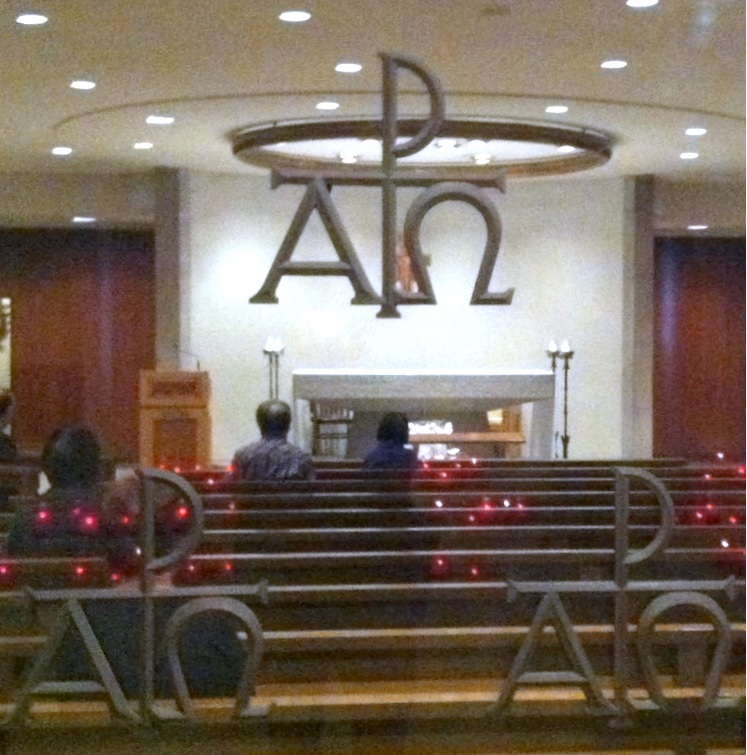
Altar in the lower church at Saint John's, seen through a glass panel etched with Alpha/Omega symbols.

One of the more active parishes in Philadelphia, St. John's offers Sunday Masses at 8:30 a.m., 10:30 a.m., 12:30 p.m. and 6:00 p.m. (along with a Saturday evening Vigil Mass at 5:15 p.m.) in the upper church. It also offers three Masses each weekday in the lower church, at 7:45 a.m., 12:05 p.m., and 5:15 p.m., serving the numerous shoppers and an estimated 200,000 workers in the dense Center City area. At one time, in an effort to serve a special population, it even had a Mass at 2:45 a.m. on Sundays for workers leaving their businesses at that time, called the "Printers' Mass," because of the many newspaper printing plants nearby.

It is also one of the few local parishes to offer confession on multiple days during the week, usually from 3:30 p.m. to 4:45 p.m. Wednesdays through Saturdays and on the vigil days for weekday holydays. This extensive sacramental schedule is offered even though the current number of homes registered in the parish is only 821 (due to the largely commercial nature of the surrounding area).

The weekly church bulletin (with special schedules and listings of other events) is online.

== History ==
=== Founding ===
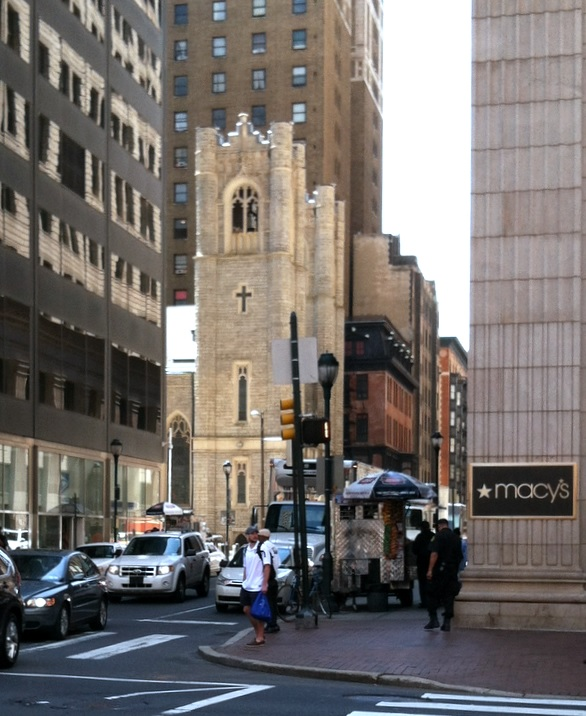
Exterior of St. John the Evangelist Catholic Church at 13th and Market Streets in Philadelphia, PA, showing location in commercial area of the city where it primarily ministers to commuters and workers.

The charter for the parish was granted on December 27, 1830, the feast of St. John the Evangelist, by the Bishop, Francis P. Kenrick, to the Rev. John Hughes, although the location for the church was not chosen until the following year. The church finally was consecrated on Passion Sunday (April 8) in 1832. The interior of the church, at the time (it was since damaged twice by fire), included a fresco painted by Nicholas Monachesi, who became renowned as a local portrait painter and, in 1834, the United States premiere of Mozart's Requiem Mass was held at the church. It was later that year, on August 1, that the first fire on the block occurred.

=== Cathedral and Nativist Riots ===
In 1838, the church was designated as Philadelphia's Proto-Cathedral and the bishop took up residence in the rectory. [The previous cathedral, from 1810 to 1838, was Old St. Mary's Church at 4th and Locust Streets.] In 1844 the Nativist Riots, in which several dozen people were killed, broke out. After two Catholic churches (St. Michael's and St. Augustine's) were destroyed, General George Cadwalader placed cannon near the cathedral to protect it and the disturbances did not damage the church.

In the 1850s, two future saints were connected with the parish; Katherine Drexel received first communion and was confirmed at the parish while John Neumann, Bishop Kenrick's replacement when he was named Archbishop of Baltimore, arrived to become bishop on March 30, 1852; as bishop he lived in the parish (then the cathedral) rectory.

At this time (1855–1860), the Jesuit order took over administration of the parish when the pastor entered the Jesuit order. In 1864, the current cathedral, the Basilica of Saints Peter and Paul on Logan Circle, was named the diocesan cathedral and St. John's again became an ordinary parish. During St. John's time as cathedral, Philadelphia had 170,000 Catholics.

=== Fire of 1899 ===
In February, 1899, the church was burned in a fire which destroyed much of the block where it was located, and there was also damage to the rectory. Three firemen died when the building collapsed atop them and a fourth died later of pneumonia, contracted while battling the blaze in the February weather. A Mass to pray for them was held later that month in the Academy of Music, since the upper church was unusable. In recent years, an annual Mass for this purpose is held each year.

Later in 1899, the parish school was moved out of the basement area of the church which was converted to a lower church for the celebration of the Sacraments while the main (upper church) was repaired.

== International ties ==
The original pastor, Fr. Hughes, became close friends with a parishioner who had lived in Mexico for several years and, through him, ties with that country and people from it endured for many years. Not only was there financial support from Mexican merchants living in Philadelphia, but, when the exiled Mexican Emperor Augustín de Iturbide was executed by Santa Anna upon his return in 1824, his family moved to Philadelphia and his widow, ex-Empress Ana Maria Huarte de Iturbide, is buried in St. John's Churchyard Cemetery, along with some other members of her family. During the anti-religious persecution in the 1920s, the Sisters of the Visitation were expelled from Mexico and lived on the church property at St. John's for several years, before moving to their current monastery site.

In 1939, Bishop Yu Pin urged the Chinese community to connect with the parish; ultimately hundreds did and a chapel (later renamed Holy Redeemer Church) was opened about six blocks away from the main church in the heart of Chinatown, where it still operates.

== See also ==
- List of Catholic cathedrals in the United States
- List of cathedrals in the United States
