= Mexican Prince =

Mexican Prince was the title created on June 22, 1822 by the Mexican Constituent Congress during the First Mexican Empire, to be granted to legitimate children who were not the heir or firstborn of the Emperor Agustín de Iturbide. This title went to the legitimate sons of Agustín de Iturbide and Ana María Huarte at the time of the decree. Later Felipe de Iturbide became a Mexican Prince at birth months later.

== Decree ==
The Sovereign Mexican Constituent Congress decreed on June 22, 1822 the following:

- Art 1 °. The Mexican Monarchy, in addition to being moderate and Constitutional, is also hereditary.
- Art 2 °. Consequently, the Nation calls the succession of the Crown for the death of the current Emperor, his firstborn son Don Agustín Jerónimo de Iturbide. The Constitution of the Empire will decide the order of succession of the throne.
- Art 3 °. The crown prince will be called "Prince Imperial" and will have the treatment of Imperial Highness.
- Art 4 °. The legitimate sons and daughters of H.I.M will be called "Mexican Princes", and will have the treatment of Highness.
- Art 5 °. Don José Joaquín de Iturbide y Arreguí, Father of H.I.M, is decorated with the title of "Prince of the Union" and the treatment of Highness, during his life.
- Art 6 °. It is also granted the title of "Princess of Iturbide" and the treatment of Highness, during his life, to Doña María Nicolasa de Iturbide y Arámburo, sister of the Emperor.

== List of Mexican Princes ==
Image	Coat of arms	First name	Description
H.I.M Agustín I (Constitutional Emperor of Mexico since May 19, 1822 to March 19, 1823)
		H.H Sabina de Iturbide y Huarte	June 22, 1822 – March 19, 1823
		H.H Juana María de Iturbide y Huarte	June 22, 1822 – March 19, 1823
		H.H Josefa de Iturbide y Huarte (Princess of Iturbide 1865–1867)	June 22, 1822 – March 19, 1823
		H.H Ángel de Iturbide y Huarte	June 22, 1822 – March 19, 1823
		H.H María de Jesús de Iturbide y Huarte (Isis)	June 22, 1822 – March 19, 1823
		H.H Salvador de Iturbide y Huarte	June 22, 1822 – March 19, 1823
		H.H Felipe de Iturbide y Huarte	November 30, 1822 – March 19, 1823
