= Prince Imperial of Mexico =

Former title used in Mexico

Flag of the Imperial Regiment of the First Mexican Empire

Flag of the Second Mexican Empire

The Prince Imperial of Mexico is the title created on June 22, 1822 by the Mexican Constituent Congress, to be granted to the firstborn and heir of Emperor Agustín de Iturbide. This title also refers to the heads of the Imperial House and designated to be the official title of the heir apparent to the imperial throne of Mexico.

== Decree ==
The Sovereign Mexican Constituent Congress decreed on June 22, 1822 the following:

- Art 1 °. The Mexican Monarchy, in addition to being moderate and Constitutional, is also hereditary.
- Art 2 °. Consequently, the Nation calls the succession of the Crown for the death of the current Emperor, his firstborn son Don Agustín Jerónimo de Iturbide. The Constitution of the Empire will decide the order of succession of the throne.
- Art 3 °. The crown prince will be called "Prince Imperial" and will have the treatment of Imperial Highness.
- Art 4 °. The legitimate sons and daughters of H.I.M will be called "Mexican Princes", and will have the treatment of Highness.
- Art 5 °. Don José Joaquín de Iturbide y Arreguí, Father of H.I.M, is decorated with the title of "Prince of the Union" and the treatment of Highness, during his life.
- Art 6 °. It is also granted the title of "Princess of Iturbide" and the treatment of Highness, during his life, to Doña María Nicolasa de Iturbide y Arámburo, sister of the Emperor.

== List of title holders ==
Image	Coat of arms	First name	Tenure
H.I.M. Agustín I Constitutional Emperor of Mexico (May 19, 1822 – March 19, 1823)
		H.I.H. Agustín Jerónimo de Iturbide	June 22, 1822 – March 19, 1823 Heir; March 20, 1823 – September 16, 1865
H.I.M. Maximilian I Emperor of Mexico (April 10, 1864 – May 15, 1867)
		H.H. Agustín José de Iturbide	September 16, 1865 – May 15, 1867 Heir; May 16, 1867 – March 3, 1925

== See also ==
- Imperial Crown of Mexico
