= House of Iturbide =

Mexican imperial family

- Country: Mexico
- Founded: • 1432: Martín de Iturbide was ennobled by King John II of Aragon, with the position of perpetual mayor of the Baztan Valley. • 1822: It became an Imperial House with Agustín I of Mexico.
- Founder: Agustín I
- Current head: Maximilian von Götzen-Iturbide (cognatic descendant)
- Titles: Emperor of Mexico; Empress of Mexico; Prince Imperial of Mexico; Mexican Prince; Princess of Iturbide; Prince of the Union; Prince of Iturbide (Created by Maximilian I on 16 September 1865)

The House of Iturbide (Spanish: Casa de Iturbide) is a former Imperial House of Mexico. It was founded by the Sovereign Mexican Constituent Congress on 22 June 1822 when the newly independent Mexican congress confirmed Agustín I's title of Constitutional Emperor of Mexico. He was baptized with the names of Saints Augustine, Cosmas, and Damian at the cathedral there. The last name Iturbide was originally from the Basque Country, Spain, this currently imperial house has an origin in the nobility called "hidalguía", which is the untitled nobility very similar to the baronet in the British nobility system. Agustín abdicated on May 19, 1823, and lived in exile with the prohibition on returning to Mexico. Despite that ban, he returned, was captured and executed by a congressional death decree, without trial and without the opportunity for a defense. On September 19, 1865, two grandchildren of Emperor Agustín were adopted by Maximilian I of Mexico (1864–1867), Agustin and Salvador de Iturbide, who had no biological children, and granted some status in the ephemeral Second Mexican Empire.

== History ==
=== Decree ===
The Sovereign Mexican Constituent Congress decreed on 22 June 1822 the following:

- Art 1 °. The Mexican Monarchy, in addition to being moderate and Constitutional, is also hereditary.
- Art 2 °. Consequently, the Nation calls the succession of the Crown for the death of the current Emperor, his firstborn son Don Agustín Jerónimo de Iturbide. The Constitution of the Empire will decide the order of succession of the throne.
- Art 3 °. The crown prince will be called "Prince Imperial" and will have the treatment of Imperial Highness.
- Art 4 °. The legitimate sons and daughters of H.I.M will be called "Mexican Princes", and will have the treatment of Highness.
- Art 5 °. Don José Joaquín de Iturbide y Arreguí, Father of H.I.M, is decorated with the title of "Prince of the Union" and the treatment of Highness, during his life.
- Art 6 °. It is also granted the title of "Princess of Iturbide" and the treatment of Highness, during his life, to Doña María Nicolasa de Iturbide y Arámburo, sister of the Emperor.

=== First Mexican Empire (1821–1823) ===
On September 27, 1821, Agustín de Iturbide achieved Mexican Independence through the Plan of Iguala, which established a Constitutional Monarchy with a division of powers. A Governing Junta was created as the Legislative Power, the Cortes as the Judicial Power, and a Regency as the Executive Power, in which the Liberator was appointed President of the Regency. In due course, the Sovereign Provisional Governing Junta called for elections to form a Constituent Congress, which was installed on February 24, 1822, swearing to uphold the principles of the Plan of Iguala and the Treaty of Córdoba. These documents were to serve as the fundamental basis for the Constitution of the Mexican Nation, which, in summary, provided that the Executive Power would be vested in the Constitutional Emperor, the Legislative Power in the Congress, and the Judicial Power in the Supreme Court.

==== Regency ====
The Sovereign Provisional Governing Junta, in accordance with the Plan of Iguala and the Treaty of Córdoba, voted that the Regency should be composed of five individuals. Consequently, the first and second Regents were elected: Agustín de Iturbide and Juan O'Donojú. For the third, fourth, and fifth Regent positions, the following candidates were submitted to a vote: Pedro José Fonte (Archbishop of Mexico); Antonio Joaquín Pérez Martínez (Bishop of Puebla); Vicente Guerrero; José Isidro Yáñez; Miguel Guridi; Guadalupe Victoria; Manuel Martínez; Manuel de Sotarriba; Manuel de Bárcena; Miguel Jerónimo de Cervantes (Marquis of Salvatierra); Manuel de Heras Soto; Pedro José de Terreros; and Manuel Velázquez de León.

==== Decree of Proclamation ====
The Sovereign Mexican Constituent Congress decreed on May 19, 1822, the following:

In the Court of Mexico, on the nineteenth day of May of the year eighteen hundred and twenty-two, the second of Independence. The Sovereign Mexican Constituent Congress, assembled in extraordinary session—convened due to the events of the previous night and the report given regarding them by the Generalissimo Admiral [Agustín de Iturbide], together with the transmission of several documents transcribed in today’s record—having heard the acclamations of the people, in agreement with the general will of Congress and of the Nation; and taking into consideration that the Cortes of Spain, by decree published in the Gaceta de Madrid of the thirteenth and fourteenth of February last, have declared null the Treaty of Córdoba, and that therefore its fulfillment no longer binds the Mexican Nation, which remains in the freedom granted by Article Three of said treaty to the Sovereign Constituent Congress of this Empire to name an Emperor, due to the renunciation or non-acceptance by those therein designated [His Majesty Don Ferdinand VII; His Royal Highness Infante Don Carlos; His Royal Highness Infante Don Francisco de Paula; His Highness Don Carlos Luis], has seen fit to elect as Constitutional Emperor of the Mexican Empire Don Agustín de Iturbide, the first of his name, under the bases proclaimed in the Plan of Iguala and accepted generally by the Nation, which are detailed in the formula of the oath he must take before Congress on the twenty-first day of the present month. Let the Regency take notice of this and communicate it to all authorities of the Mexican Empire, having it printed, published, and circulated; upon which act it shall cease in the exercise of its interim charge.

On 11 May 1823, the ex-emperor boarded the British ship Rawlins, en route to Livorno, Italy (then part of the Grand Duchy of Tuscany), accompanied by his wife, children and some servants. There, he rented a small country house and began to write his memoirs. However, Spain pressured Tuscany to expel Iturbide, which it did, and the Iturbide family moved to the United Kingdom. There, he published his autobiography, "Statement of Some of the Principal Events in the Public Life of Agustín de Iturbide". When he was exiled, Iturbide was given a government pension, but Congress also declared him a traitor and "outside of the law", to be killed if he ever returned to Mexico. Whether he was aware of this second part is in dispute.

After his departure, the situation in Mexico continued to worsen. Reports of a probable Spanish attempt to retake Mexico reached Iturbide in the UK. He continued to receive reports from Mexico, as well as advice from supporters, that if he returned, he would be hailed as a liberator and a potential leader against the Spanish invasion. Iturbide sent word to congress in Mexico City on 13 February 1824 offering his services in the event of a Spanish attack. Congress never replied. More conservative political factions in Mexico finally convinced Iturbide to return."

Iturbide returned to Mexico on 14 July 1824, accompanied by his wife, two children, and a chaplain (Joseph A. Lopez). He landed at the port of Soto la Marina on the coast of Nuevo Santander (the modern-day state of Tamaulipas). They were initially greeted enthusiastically, but soon they were arrested and escorted by General Felipe de la Garza, the local military commander, to the nearby village of Padilla. The local legislature held a trial and sentenced Iturbide to death. When a local priest administered last rites, Iturbide supposedly said, "Mexicans! I die with honor, not as a traitor; do not leave this stain on my children and my legacy. I am not a traitor, no." He was executed by firing squad on 19 July 1824.

=== Second Mexican Empire (1864–1867) ===
In 1863, the Mexican Conservative Party, with the support of Napoleon III of France, attempted to establish a new monarchy under Austrian Hapsburg Archduke Ferdinand Maximilian as Emperor Maximilian I of Mexico. Maximilian, who had no natural offspring, adopted two grandsons of the first Mexican emperor, Agustín de Iturbide y Green and Salvador de Iturbide y Marzán. Agustín and Salvador were each granted the vitalicio (meaning non-hereditary) title of Prince de Iturbide and style of Highness by imperial decree and followed in rank after the reigning family. The forces of the Mexican Republic captured and executed Emperor Maximilian in 1867, ending monarchy in Mexico.

=== Decree ===
The Emperor Maximilian of Habsburg decreed on 16 September 1865 the following:

- Art 1 °. The title of "Princes of Iturbide" is awarded to Don Agustín de Iturbide and Don Salvador de Iturbide, grandsons of the Emperor Agustín de Iturbide, as well as his daughter Doña Josefa de Iturbide.
- Art 2 °. The Princes mentioned in the previous article, will have the treatment of Highness, and will take rank after the reigning family.
- Art 3 °. This title is not hereditary, and in the event that the mentioned princes had legitimate succession, the reigning Emperor or the Regency will reserve the faculty to grant the expressed title, in each case, to that or those of his successors that they deem convenient.
- Art 4 °. By virtue of the arrangements made with the members of the Iturbide family, the Emperor takes the guardianship and curatorship of the aforementioned princes Agustín and Salvador de Iturbide, appointing as co-tutor the Princess Josefa de Iturbide.
- Art 5 °. The coat of arms used by the aforementioned princes, will be the ancient of his family, with mantle and crown of Prince, and having as support the two rampant wolves of the same shield of his family, granting them by special grace the use of the National Shield in the center of the aforementioned blazon, according to the design that is attached.
- Art 6 °. The Princes of Iturbide will have the right to wear the national badge without a flame, and the button with its crown of Prince.

In 1867, Maximilian was captured, tried, and executed by the Mexican Republic ruled by President Benito Juárez. After two short-lived attempts at monarchy in Mexico that ended with the execution of the monarchs, Mexico has remained a republic.

== Genealogy ==
=== Genealogy of Agustín I ===
Arms of alliance of Iturbide and Götzen families

Children:

- Agustín Jerónimo de Iturbide y Huarte (1807–1866) Titular Emperor of Mexico (1824–1864)
  - Jesusa de Iturbide y Fernández de Piérola (1842–1914)
    - Pedro José Nicolás de Piérola Iturbide (1862–1886)
    - Eva María de Piérola Iturbide (1863–1919)
    - Raquel de Piérola Iturbide (1865–1886)
    - Adán Jesús Isaías de Piérola Iturbide (1866–1935)
    - Luis Benjamín de Piérola Iturbide (1867–1868)
    - Benjamín Amadeo de Piérola Iturbide (1868–1945)
    - Jesusa María Salomé Victoria de Piérola Iturbide (1870–1896)
      - A large issue of their descendants.
        - Eventually:
          - Jorge Nicolás de Piérola Gabriel (1977)
          - Claudio André de Piérola Gili (1987)
- Sabina María de Iturbide y Huarte (1810–1871)
- Juana María Francisca de Iturbide y Huarte (1812–1828)
- Josefa de Iturbide y Huarte (1814–1891)
- Ángel María José de Iturbide y Huarte (1816–1872)
  - Agustín de Iturbide y Green (1863–1925) (adopted by Maximilian I of Mexico) Titular Emperor of Mexico (1867–1925)
- María de Jesús Juana de Iturbide y Huarte (1818–1849)
- María de los Dolores de Iturbide y Huarte (1819–1820)
- Salvador María de Iturbide y Huarte (1820–1856)
  - Salvador de Iturbide y Marzán (1849–1895) (adopted by Maximilian I of Mexico)
    - María Josepha Sophia de Iturbide (1872–1949) Titular Empress of Mexico (1925–1949)
      - Baroness Maria Anna Tunkl-Iturbide (1909–1962)
      - Baroness Maria Gisella Tunkl-Iturbide (1912–1999)
        - Count Maximilian von Götzen-Iturbide (1944) Titular Emperor of Mexico (1949–)
          - Ferdinand von Götzen-Iturbide (1992)
          - Emmanuella von Götzen-Iturbide (1998)
        - Countess Emmanuella von Götzen-Iturbide (1945)
          - Nicholas McAulay (1970)
          - Edward McAulay (1973)
          - Augustin McAulay (1977)
          - Patrick McAulay (1979)
          - Phillip McAulay (1981)
          - Camilla McAulay (1982)
          - Gisella McAulay (1985)
    - Maria Gisella de Iturbide (1874–1875)
    - Maria Theresa de Iturbide (1876–1915)
- Felipe Andrés María Guadalupe de Iturbide y Huarte (1822–1853)
- Agustín Cosme de Iturbide y Huarte (1825–1873)

== Heraldry ==
Heraldry of the House of Iturbide

Prince Imperial of Mexico.

Mexican Princes.

Princess of Iturbide (1822–1823).

Prince of the Union.

1. Azure, three bendlets argent
2. Gules, a pale argent between two lions counter-rampant or
3. Gules, two wolves passant or in pale
4. Barry of eight azure and argent

— Imperial House — House of Iturbide
First Empire declared	Ruling House of Mexico; 19 May 1822 – 19 March 1823	Vacant Empire abolished
