= Josefa de Iturbide y Huarte =

Josefa de Iturbide
- Princess of Iturbide
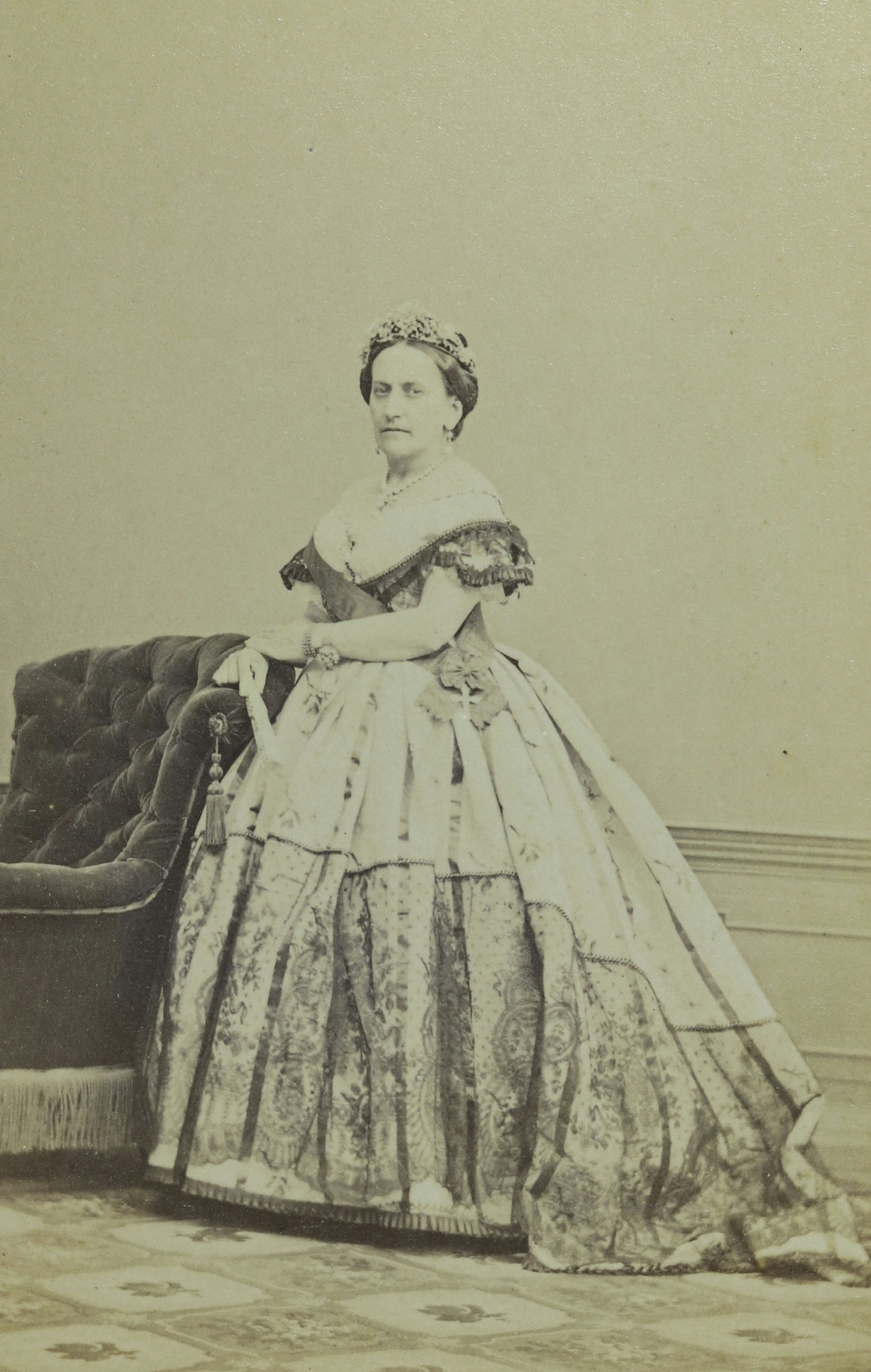
- Born: December 22, 1814; Guanajuato, New Spain
- Died: December 5, 1891 (aged 76); Mexico City, Mexico
- Burial: Panteón Villa de Guadalupe
Names
- Spanish: Josefa de Iturbide y Huarte
- Imperial House: Iturbide
- Father: Agustín I of Mexico
- Mother: Ana María Huarte

Josefa de Iturbide y Huarte (December 22, 1814 — December 5, 1891) was the daughter of Agustín de Iturbide and Ana María Huarte who received the title of Mexican Princess during the First Mexican Empire by the Constituent Congress and Princess of Iturbide during the Second Mexican Empire by Maximilian of Habsburg.

== Decree I ==
The Sovereign Mexican Constituent Congress decreed on June 22, 1822 the following:

- Art 1 °. The Mexican Monarchy, in addition to being moderate and Constitutional, is also hereditary.
- Art 2 °. Consequently, the Nation calls the succession of the Crown for the death of the current Emperor, his firstborn son Don Agustín Jerónimo de Iturbide. The Constitution of the Empire will decide the order of succession of the throne.
- Art 3 °. The crown prince will be called "Prince Imperial" and will have the treatment of Imperial Highness.
- Art 4 °. The legitimate sons and daughters of H.I.M will be called "Mexican Princes", and will have the treatment of Highness.
- Art 5 °. Don José Joaquín de Iturbide y Arreguí, Father of H.I.M, is decorated with the title of "Prince of the Union" and the treatment of Highness, during his life.
- Art 6 °. It is also granted the title of "Princess of Iturbide" and the treatment of Highness, during his life, to Doña María Nicolasa de Iturbide y Arámburo, sister of the Emperor.

== Decree II ==
The Emperor Maximilian of Habsburg decreed on September 16, 1865 the following:

- Art 1 °. The title of "Princes of Iturbide" is awarded to Don Agustín de Iturbide and Don Salvador de Iturbide, grandsons of the Emperor Agustín de Iturbide, as well as his daughter Doña Josefa de Iturbide.
- Art 2 °. The Princes mentioned in the previous article, will have the treatment of Highness, and will take rank after the reigning family.
- Art 3 °. This title is not hereditary, and in the event that the mentioned princes had legitimate succession, the reigning Emperor or the Regency will reserve the faculty to grant the expressed title, in each case, to that or those of his successors that they deem convenient.
- Art 4 °. By virtue of the arrangements made with the members of the Iturbide family, the Emperor takes the guardianship and curatorship of the aforementioned princes Agustín and Salvador de Iturbide, appointing as co-tutor the Princess Josefa de Iturbide.
- Art 5 °. The coat of arms used by the aforementioned princes, will be the ancient of his family, with mantle and crown of Prince, and having as support the two rampant wolves of the same shield of his family, granting them by special grace the use of the National Shield in the center of the aforementioned blazon, according to the design that is attached.
- Art 6 °. The Princes of Iturbide will have the right to wear the national badge without a flame, and the button with its crown of Prince.

== Death ==
Mrs. Josefa de Iturbide has passed away, the only one of all the children of Emperor Agustin de Iturbide who survived. Her last years were spent in this capital, completely withdrawn, rarely leaving her room at the Hotel Comonfort, where she lived. She lived accompanied by maids. Her character was serious, as was natural, not being able to forget the iniquitous crime that made her an orphan. Several governments did justice to the Princess of Iturbide, decreeing that she be paid a regular pension, which was the only resource she had. Josefa and filled her with attention. Gravity lasted a few days, although it took time to suffer some ills. She expired as a believer, with all the sacraments of the Church. Few friends attended the funeral. The funeral procession was modest and simple, her body being buried in the Pantheon of the Villa de Guadalupe, Mexico City. [...] Heaven forbid that the death of the last daughter of the man to whom we owe our homeland destroys forever the unjust hatred that is fictitiously excited in the ignorant classes against the enlightened name of Iturbide, and that the abandonment in which his last daughter died is the last manifestation of the injustice of Mexico towards the family of his greatest hero [...] Josefa de Iturbide ended her life, to whom destiny elevated her twice to the rank of Princess of Mexico

— El Tiempo, Newspaper of Mexico

== Ancestry ==
Ancestors of Josefa de Iturbide y Huarte

16. Salvador José de Iturbide y Irigarya
8. Jose de Iturbide y Alvarez de Eulate
17. Magdalena Álvarez de Eulate y Vicuña
4. José Joaquín de Iturbide y Arregui
18. José de Arregui
9. María Josefa de Arregui y Gastelu
19. Josefa de Gastelu
2. Agustín de Iturbide y Aramburu
10. Sebastián de Arámburu y Urdizibar
5. María Josefa de Arámburu y Carillo de Figueroa
11. Micaela Nicolasa Carillo de Figueroa y Villaseñor
1. Josefa de Iturbide y Huarte
12. Juan Francisco de Huarte e Iriarte
6. Isidro de Huarte y Arrivillaga
26. Jacobo de Arrivillaga y Barrenechea
13. Agustina Antonia de Arrivillaga y Minondo
27. Margarita de Minondo y Huici
3. Ana María de Huarte y Muñiz
28. Antonio Muñiz
14. Manuel Muñiz y Peo
29. Antonia de Peo y Valdés
7. Ana Manuela Muñiz y Sanchez de Tagle
30. Andrés Sánchez de Tagle y Pérez de la Sierra
15. Isabel Sánchez de Tagle y Veydacar
31. María de Veydacar
