= Prince of the Union =

Prince of the Union was the title created June 22, 1822, by the Constituent Congress, to be granted to the father of the emperor Agustín de Iturbide. This title went to Don José Joaquín de Iturbide.

== Decree ==
The Sovereign Mexican Constituent Congress decreed on June 22, 1822 the following:

- Art 1 °. The Mexican Monarchy, in addition to being moderate and Constitutional, is also hereditary.
- Art 2 °. Consequently, the Nation calls the succession of the Crown for the death of the current Emperor, his firstborn son Don Agustín Jerónimo de Iturbide. The Constitution of the Empire will decide the order of succession of the throne.
- Art 3 °. The crown prince will be called "Prince Imperial" and will have the treatment of Imperial Highness.
- Art 4 °. The legitimate sons and daughters of H.I.M will be called "Mexican Princes", and will have the treatment of Highness.
- Art 5 °. Don José Joaquín de Iturbide y Arreguí, Father of H.I.M, is decorated with the title of "Prince of the Union" and the treatment of Highness, during his life.
- Art 6 °. It is also granted the title of "Princess of Iturbide" and the treatment of Highness, during his life, to Doña María Nicolasa de Iturbide y Arámburo, sister of the Emperor.

== List ==
Image	Coat of arms	Name	Description
H.I.M Agustín I (Constitutional Emperor of Mexico since May 19, 1822 to March 19, 1823)
		H.H José Joaquín de Iturbide y Arregui	June 22, 1822 – March 19, 1823
