= José Joaquín de Iturbide =

- Prince of the Union
- Born: February 6, 1739; Navarra, Spain
- Died: November 19, 1825 (aged 86); Murcia, Spain
- Spouse: María Josefa Arámburu y Carrillo de Figueroa
- Issue: María Nicolasa Iturbide y Arámburu; José Francisco Iturbide y Arámburu; José de Iturbide y Arámburu; María Ignacia de Iturbide y Arámburu; María Josefa de Iturbide y Arámburu; Agustín de Iturbide y Arámburu; Francisco Manuel de Iturbide y Arámburu; María Ana de Iturbide y Arámburu; Mariano de Iturbide y Arámburu
Names
- Spanish: José Joaquín de Iturbide y Arregui
- House: Iturbide
- Father: Joseph of Iturbide Álvarez of Eulate
- Mother: María Josefa Arregui Gaztelu
- Religion: Roman Catholicism

José Joaquín de Iturbide y Arregui (February 6, 1739 – November 19, 1825) was the father of Agustín de Iturbide, who ruled the First Mexican Empire as Agustin I.

As father of the Emperor, he held the title of Prince of the Union during his son's reign. After Agustin I's abdication and exile, all titles resulting from his son's coronation were nullified by the Provisional Government of Mexico.

== Background ==
José Joaquín arrived in New Spain with the same objective as many of the Spaniards who resided in Spanish America and who came with the desire to make a fortune. So when arriving in New Spain with his relative Pedro Antonio de Iturbide, he went to Zacatecas, meanwhile José Joaquín went to Valladolid, where he met his paternal uncle, the canon Arregui between 1760 and 1766, who does it administrator of ranches and haciendas of the Church, stories like Irapeo in Morelia, and Toredán of Taretánunas in the Province of San Nicolás, Valladolid.

== Decree ==
The Sovereign Mexican Constituent Congress decreed on June 22, 1822 the following:

- Art 1 °. The Mexican Monarchy, in addition to being moderate and Constitutional, is also hereditary.
- Art 2 °. Consequently, the Nation calls the succession of the Crown for the death of the current Emperor, his firstborn son Don Agustín Jerónimo de Iturbide. The Constitution of the Empire will decide the order of succession of the throne.
- Art 3 °. The crown prince will be called "Prince Imperial" and will have the treatment of Imperial Highness.
- Art 4 °. The legitimate sons and daughters of H.I.M will be called "Mexican Princes", and will have the treatment of Highness.
- Art 5 °. Don José Joaquín de Iturbide y Arreguí, Father of H.I.M, is decorated with the title of "Prince of the Union" and the treatment of Highness, during his life.
- Art 6 °. It is also granted the title of "Princess of Iturbide" and the treatment of Highness, during his life, to Doña María Nicolasa de Iturbide y Arámburo, sister of the Emperor.

== Heraldry ==
Coat of arms of the Prince of the Union

Quarterly: 1) Azure, three bendlets argent; 2) Gules, a pale argent between two lions counter-rampant or; 3) Gules, two wolves passant or in pale; 4) Barry of eight azure and argent
