= Emperor of Mexico =

Ruler of the Mexican Empire

- Imperial
- Imperial coat of arms

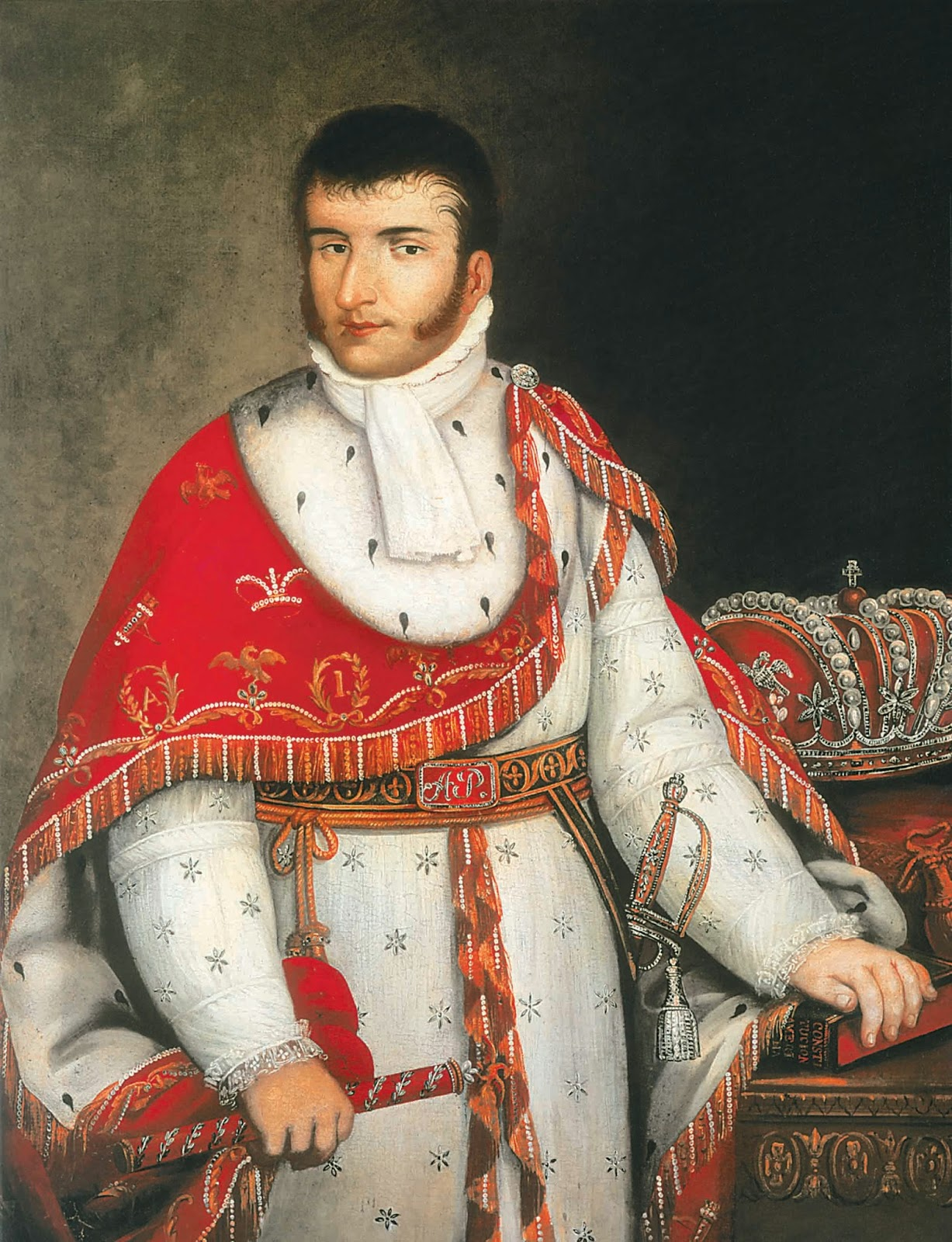
- First emperor Agustín I 19 May 1822 – 19 March 1823

Details
- Style: His Imperial Majesty
- First monarch: Agustín I
- Last monarch: Maximilian I
- Formed: 19 May 1822 (First Empire); 10 April 1864 (Second Empire)
- Abolished: 19 March 1823 (First Empire); 15 May 1867 (Second Empire)
- Residences: Palace of Moncada (1822–1823); Chapultepec Castle (1864–1867)
- Pretender: Carlos Felipe de Habsburgo-Lorena

The Emperor of Mexico (Spanish: Emperador de México) was the head of state and head of government of Mexico on two non-consecutive occasions during the 19th century.

With the Mexican Declaration of Independence from Spain in 1821, Mexico briefly became an independent monarchy – the First Mexican Empire. For a few years in the mid-1860s, Mexico reverted to being a monarchy – the Second Mexican Empire. In both instances, the reigning emperor was forcibly deposed and then executed.

== First Mexican Empire (1821–1823) ==
Portrait	Coat of arms	Name	Lifespan	Reign start	Reign end	House
		Agustín I	27 September 1783 – 19 July 1824 (aged 40)	19 May 1822	19 March 1823 (304 days)	Iturbide

=== Decree ===
The Sovereign Mexican Constituent Congress decreed on June 22, 1822 the following:

- Art 1 °. The Mexican Monarchy, in addition to being moderate and Constitutional, is also hereditary.
- Art 2 °. Consequently, the Nation calls the succession of the Crown for the death of the current Emperor, his firstborn son Don Agustín Jerónimo de Iturbide. The Constitution of the Empire will decide the order of succession of the throne.
- Art 3 °. The crown prince will be called "Prince Imperial" and will have the treatment of Imperial Highness.
- Art 4 °. The legitimate sons and daughters of H.I.M will be called "Mexican Princes", and will have the treatment of Highness.
- Art 5 °. Don José Joaquín de Iturbide y Arreguí, Father of H.I.M, is decorated with the title of "Prince of the Union" and the treatment of Highness, during his life.
- Art 6 °. It is also granted the title of "Princess of Iturbide" and the treatment of Highness, during his life, to Doña María Nicolasa de Iturbide y Arámburo, sister of the Emperor.

== Second Mexican Empire (1863–1867) ==
Portrait	Coat of arms	Name	Lifespan	Emperor from	Emperor until	House
		Maximilian I	6 July 1832 – 19 June 1867 (aged 34)	10 April 1864	19 June 1867 (3 years, 70 days)	Habsburg-Lorraine

=== Decree ===
The Superior Government Junta by the Conservative Party decreed on July 11, 1863 the following:

- Art 1 °. The Mexican nation adopts a moderated, hereditary monarchy by way of government, with a Catholic prince.
- Art 2 °. The sovereign will take the title of Emperor of Mexico.
- Art 3 °. The imperial crown of Mexico is offered to S. A. I. and R., Prince Maximilian, archduke of Austria, for himself and his descendants.
- Art 4 °. In the event that, due to circumstances impossible to foresee, Archduke Maximilian did not take possession of the throne that is offered, the Mexican nation refers to the benevolence of HM Napoleon III, emperor of the French, to be instructed by another Catholic prince.

== See also ==
- Prince Imperial of Mexico
- Regency of the Mexican Empire
- Imperial Crown of Mexico
- Mexican Imperial Orders
- List of heads of state of Mexico
- List of empresses consort of Mexico
