= La Güera Rodríguez =

Mexican independence activist (1778–1850)

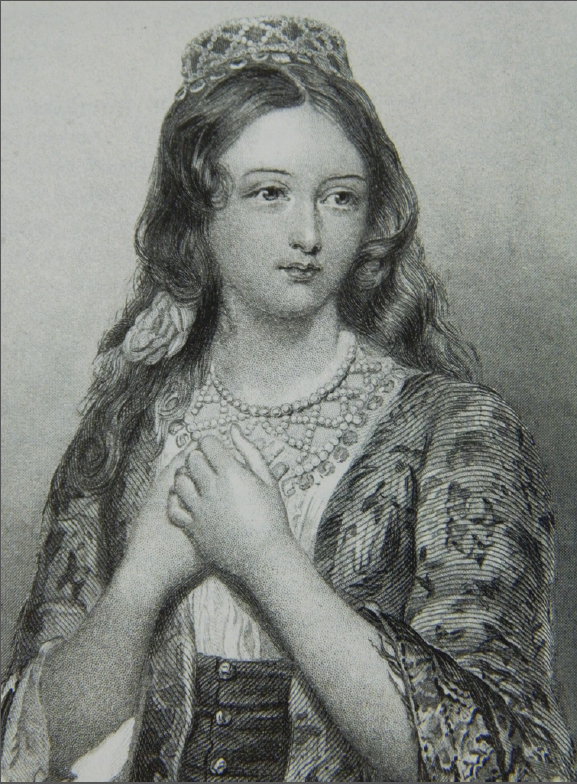
Juliana, a print that appears in the 1851 edition of the conduct book Presente Amistoso Dedicado a las Señoritas Mexicanas from Ignacio Cumplido. This image has become popularly associated with María Ignacia Rodríguez de Velasco.

María Ignacia Rodríguez de Velasco y Osorio Barba, better known as La Güera Rodríguez ("Rodríguez the Blonde") (20 November 1778 in Mexico City – 1 November 1850 in Mexico City) was a wealthy Mexican woman who is today considered a heroine of the independence movement. She was a longtime friend of Agustín de Iturbide, a royal army officer who later led the movement in New Spain for independence. In the 1840s, she became friends with Frances Calderón de la Barca, whose published observations of Mexico helped fuel interest in Rodríguez's story.

Rodríguez married three times, but only the children of her first marriage survived to adulthood; they all married well. At the time her death in 1850, she was not considered a major figure of Mexican independence. She is a controversial figure in Mexican history, with her life story manipulated by her contemporaries and historians. The 1949 publication of the historical novel by Artemio de Valle Arizpe, La Güera Rodríguez, loosely based on historical facts, popularized a fictional version of her life, which the public took as fact. Many aspects of this story are exaggerated or completely made up. Her legend has crystallized in the late twentieth century as an important figure of independence who took lovers and lived an unconventional life.

== Biography ==
The woman who came to be known as La Güera Rodríguez was born in Mexico City on 20 November 1778 to wealthy parents, Antonio Rodríguez de Velasco (1747–1810) and María Ignacia Osorio Barba y Bello Pereyra (1751–1818). María Ignacia was the oldest of three surviving sisters, María Josefa Rodríguez de Velasco (1779–1839) and María Vicenta Rodríguez de Velasco (1783–1845). Through the arbitration of viceroy Juan Vicente de Güemes, 2nd Count of Revillagigedo and the bishop, she married the military man José Jerónimo López de Peralta de Villar Villamil at the age of 15 on 7 September 1794. The marriage was unhappy, but María Ignacia was nevertheless frequently pregnant, giving birth to seven children in just ten years, six of whom survived to adulthood:

- María Josefa Villar Villamil Rodríguez (1795–1828), who married the 3rd Count of Regla, Pedro José María Romero de Terreros Rodríguez de Pedroso (1788-1846), a signatory of the Act of Independence of the Mexican Empire.
- María Antonia Villar Villamil Rodríguez (1797–1864), who married the 5th Marquis of San Miguel de Aguayo, José María Valdivielso Vidal de Lorca (1787-1836), who also signed the Act of Independence of Mexico in 1821.
- Gerónimo Mariano Villar Villamil Rodríguez (1798–1861), who inherited entailed properties as the eldest son.
- Agustín Gerónimo Villar Villamil Rodríguez (1800-1800), who died in infancy.
- Maria Guadalupe Villar Villamil Rodríguez (1801–1816), who died unmarried and was very ill for most of her short life.
- María de Paz Villar Villamil Rodríguez (1804–1828), who married the 2nd Marquis of Guadalupe, Gallardo José María Rincón Gallardo Santos del Valle (1793-1877).
- Camila Rosa Villar Villamil Rodríguez (1805–1865), who married a wealthy Spanish soldier, much to the dismay of her mother.

Among those she counted as a friend was Prussian naturalist and explorer Baron Alexander von Humboldt. Their friendship began when she invited him to view a nopal cactus plantation that she owned, after which they were "inseparable". During those years also, it is recorded that while she participated at the unveiling of the equestrian statue of Charles IV, El Cababillito. she was accompanied by Humboldt. According to Artemio de Valle Arizpe, María Ignacia was dressed in courtly apparel and walked on the arm of the gentleman. From here the first rumors of La Güera's adulteries were born, but in the long years, her first husband could not prove anything, and the evidence rather suggests that she was a long-suffering and mistreated wife. In fact, José Gerónimo's relatives, friends and colleagues took the side of his wife, who claimed to be the innocent victim of his volatile and violent character, and some had even found her "bathed in blood" from the frequent beatings he gave her.

José Gerónimo unsuccessfully attempted to shoot María Ignacia with a bullet that missed, for which she accused him of attempted murder on 4 July 1802. For his part, José Gerónimo accused María Ignacia of committing adultery with three distinguished priests, including her godfather, the cleric and doctor José Mariano Beristáin y Souza, and petitioned for the intervention of the tribunal courts of New Spain and the annulment of their marriage. The litigation between the spouses generated considerable archival documentation, which survives and was used in the petition for legal separation without the breaking of the marital bond. The annulment petition was dropped after four months, and the couple eventually reconciled and went on to have another daughter, who they named María de Paz (Mary of Peace).

When María Ignacia's husband fell ill in December of 1804, she nursed him and suffered much grief when he died on 26 January 1805. She was pregnant with their seventh child at this time, a daughter who was born on 12 June; she named the girl Camila Rosa. María Ignacia remarried on 10 February 1807 to Juan Ignacio Briones Fernández de Ricaño (1753–1807), a wealthy, much older man who died six months later on 16 August after falling victim to a cold from uncovering blankets. She was once again pregnant at this time with a daughter who was born after her father's death on 22 April 1808; she named the girl Victoria Briones Rodríguez. Victoria died in 1809, only surviving long enough for her widowed mother to inherit Briones' considerable estate. María Ignacia married for a third time many years later, raising the six children from her first marriage alone. María Ignacia was married for the third time on 5 September 1825 to Juan Manuel de Elizalde y Martinicorena. Her third marriage, which lasted until her death 25 years later, produced a stillborn son in 1826 and a daughter who died shortly after birth in 1828. María Ignacia spent her last years dedicated to religious devotion in the Third Order of Saint Francis. On 1 November 1850, she died in Mexico City, having outlived all but three of her children. Her widower entered the priesthood following her death.

María Ignacia was known in colonial Mexican society for her beauty and quick wit, although she suffered from a "chronic cough" and recurring fever. Foreign travelers referred to her as "a sort of western Madame de Staël". Guillermo Prieto, chronicler of the era, said of her, "The Güera was not only noticeable for her beauty, but also for her wit and her place in high society". In the early 1840s, one traveler claimed that La Güera had not lost her beauty nor charm: She was "very agreeable, and a perfect living chronicle...in spite of years and of the furrows which it pleases Time to plough in the loveliest faces, La Güera retains a profusion of fair curls without one gray hair, a set of beautiful white teeth, very fine eyes, and great vivacity."

=== Support for independence ===
During her widowhood, when she had autonomous control of her life, La Gũera supported the insurgent cause with her money and relationships. However, there is not strong support for her being called "Mother of the Patria", with a key role in independence. She was a wealthy widow living in difficult times but was never brought before a tribunal as an insurgent for independence, so there is no judicial record of the role she may have played. It is known that she was connected to high-ranking criollos in Mexico City, including her father, her brother-in-law the Marquis of Uluapa, and members of the Mexico City council. Following the news that Napoleon I's army had invaded Spain in 1808, arrested the Spanish king, and replaced him with his brother Joseph Napoleon, members of the city council, including her father, proposed a provisional royal government with the pro-criollo viceroy José de Iturrigaray at its head to rule in the name of the legitimate king of Spain, Ferdinand VII. Peninsular-born Spaniards in Mexico led by Gabriel de Yermo saw this as a dangerous step towards home rule in New Spain and staged a coup, ousting Iturrigaray and arresting many criollos in the process. Two of La Güera's old friends were arrested in the wake of the coup.

In 1809, she denounced a plot to poison viceroy Lizana, accusing a judge of the high court, Don Guillermo Aguirre y Viana. The documentation is confusing, but the accusation was credible enough that Aguirre was ordered to briefly leave Mexico City. The incident triggered an investigation of La Güera in March 1810 by inquisidor decano Bernardo de Prado y Obejero. Prado concluded that despite La Güerra's protestations that her denunciation was truthful that it was in retaliation for the ousting of viceroy Iturrigaray. In consequence, she was ordered to leave Mexico City for Querétaro, where she owned two houses. She was never charged or tried. Her actions showed that she was pro-criollo and paid a price for it. However, she successfully petitioned the viceroy directly in her own handwriting to return to the capital from Querétaro due to her ill health, as she was nursing her chronically ill daughter Maria Guadelupe at the time and was suffering from serious coughing, fainting, and fever. While in Querétaro in March and April 1810, she was part of the pro-criollo elite resident there. She might have known Miguel Hidalgo y Costilla, since her son's entailed estates included property near Father Hidalgo's parish of Dolores. When Hidalgo issued his Grito de Dolores that sparked the first major uprising in September 1810, she might have balanced her pro-criollo outlook with that of a wealthy property owner whose estates were endangered by insurgents. "There is no proof that La Güera played a decisive role in the first phase of the independence struggle in 1810 and 11." However, there is evidence that she gave money to insurgents, perhaps as protection against damage to her estates by insurgents. It is known that her estates were occupied by insurgents and that she received visits from officers of the insurgency.

She established a long-standing friendship with the royal army officer Agustín de Iturbide, the future emperor of Mexico, after he reversed his loyalties and forged an alliance with the insurgents. After Iturbide's triumph in bringing about independence at the head of the Army of the Three Guarantees, Iturbide, Spanish Field Marshal Francisco Novella and the incoming viceroy Juan O'Donojú met at her landed estate, Hacienda de la Patera, to negotiate the final terms of independence. Iturbide's cousin Domingo Malo was managing La Güera's property there. There were rumors that La Güera and Iturbide had an illicit relationship, and they did live across the street from each other in Mexico City, but a written account by Vicente Rocafuerte, one of Iturbide's detractors, claimed in print that he was having an affair with a beautiful aristocratic blond woman "full of charm and talent, bewitching, and endowed with a great genius for intrigue and mischief." Rocafuerte alleges that the origin of his Plan of Iguala, uniting disgruntled royalists and rebels in the fight for independence, was strongly influenced by La Güera.

== Evolving legend ==
A key element in creating and disseminating the legend of La Güera as an important figure of Mexican independence, one of the few women to have done so, was the publication in 1949 of the novel La Güera Rodríguez. It subsequently underwent revisions and further editions. According to La Güera's biographer, historian Silvia Marina Arrom, most readers considered the text as being "true tales about an interesting historical figure." His novel is loosely based on the relatively scant facts of her biography found in the archives and published sources. But in shaping her narrative for his purpose of presenting an entertaining and accessible view of the independence period for Mexicans, Valle Arizpe added elements that are pure fiction. Arrom's scholarly biography of La Güera has sought to untangle fact from fiction and place her legend and biography within the larger context of Mexican history.
