= Agustín de Iturbide =

Emperor of Mexico from 1822 to 1823

Agustín I
- Emperor of Mexico
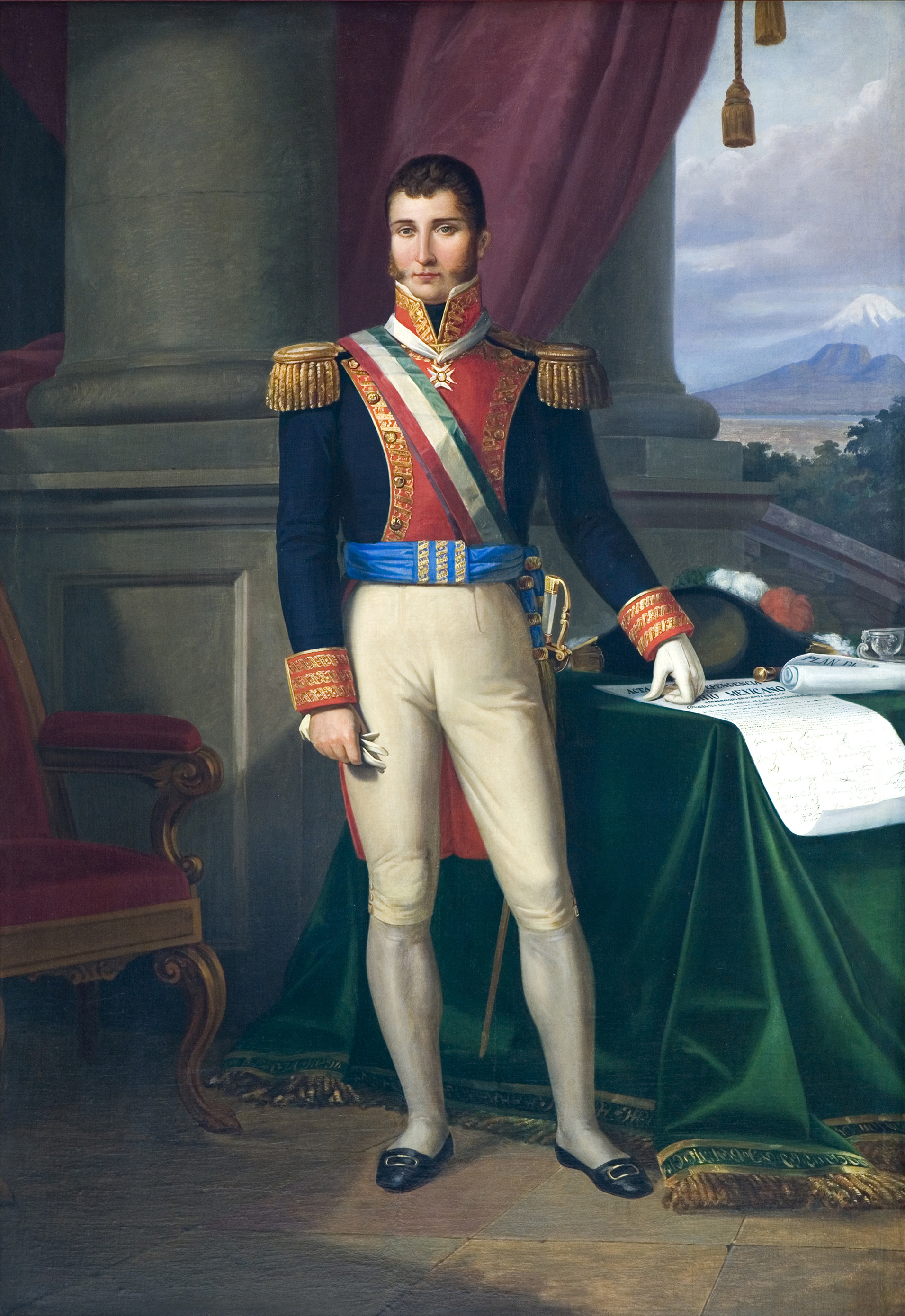
- Portrait by Primitivo Miranda, 1865

Emperor of Mexico
- Reign: 19 May 1822 – 19 March 1823
- Coronation: 21 July 1822
- Predecessor: Monarchy established
- Successor: Provisional Government (Chronologically); Maximilian I (as Emperor)

President of the Regency of Mexico
- In office 28 September 1821 – 18 May 1822
- Preceded by: Monarchy established
- Succeeded by: Juan Nepomuceno Almonte (Second Mexican Empire)
- Born: Agustín Cosme Damián de Iturbide y Arámburu; 27 September 1783; Valladolid, Viceroyalty of New Spain (now Morelia, Michoacán, Mexico)
- Died: 19 July 1824 (aged 40); Padilla, Tamaulipas, Mexico
- Cause of death: Execution by shooting
- Burial: 27 October 1838; Mexico City Cathedral
- Spouse: Ana María Josefa Ramona de Huarte y Muñiz (m. 1805)
- Issue: Agustín Jerónimo, Prince Imperial of Mexico; Princess Sabina; Princess Juana de Dios; Princess Josefa; Prince Ángel; Princess María de Jesús; Princess María de los Dolores; Prince Salvador María; Prince Felipe; Prince Agustín Cosme
Names
- Agustín Cosme Damián de Iturbide y Arámburu
- House: Iturbide
- Father: José Joaquín de Iturbide y Arreguí
- Mother: María Josefa de Arámburu y Carrillo de Figueroa
- Religion: Roman Catholicism

Agustín Cosme Damián de Iturbide y Arámburu (Spanish pronunciation: [aɣusˈtin de ituɾˈbiðe]; 27 September 1783 – 19 July 1824), commonly known as Agustín de Iturbide and later by his regnal name Agustín I, was a Mexican army officer and politician who served as the first Emperor of Mexico from 1822 until his abdication in 1823.

A criollo from a family of Valladolid's landed gentry, Iturbide entered the royal Spanish army in 1805 and became one of the most important commanders in the Mexican War of Independence, repeatedly defeating the insurgent forces from 1810 to 1815, culminating in the capture and execution of José María Morelos in 1815. He was dismissed from command in 1816 for corruption and cruelty towards the insurgent forces, but was reinstated in 1820 to defeat Vicente Guerrero. However, fearing the onset of republicanism following Spain's restoration of the liberal constitution of 1812, Iturbide allied with the insurgents under the plan of Iguala of 1821, which aimed to turn Mexico into a monarchy, with Roman Catholicism as its official religion and the abolition of the racial caste system and slavery. The new Army of the Three Guarantees quickly defeated the Spanish forces, and on 27 September 1821 Iturbide marched into Mexico City; the next day, Mexico was proclaimed an independent empire.

Iturbide was proclaimed president of the Regency in 1821. The refusal by Ferdinand VII of Spain to accept the Mexican crown paved the way for Iturbide to assume the mantle of emperor on 21 July 1822. His reign was turbulent, characterized by the political conflict with former insurgents, progressives and loyalists to Ferdinand VII, economic troubles and fears of a Spanish invasion. His dissolution of Congress on 31 October 1822 precipitated a military revolt in December led by Antonio López de Santa Anna, Guadalupe Victoria and Guerrero. With his forces defecting to the rebels, Iturbide decided to abdicate on 19 March 1823. In May 1823 he went into exile in Europe. When he returned to Mexico in July 1824, he was arrested and executed by a local legislature.

== Family and early life ==
Agustín Cosme Damián de Iturbide y Arámburu was born in what was then called Valladolid, now Morelia, the provincial capital of Michoacán, on 27 September 1783. He was baptized with the names of Saints Augustine, Cosmas, and Damian at the cathedral. The fifth child born to his parents, he was the only male to survive and eventually became head of the family. Iturbide's parents were part of the privileged landed class of Valladolid, owning agricultural land including the haciendas of Apeo and Guaracha as well as lands in nearby Quirio.

Iturbide's father, Joaquín de Iturbide, came from a family of the Basque gentry who had been confirmed in the nobility by King Juan II of Aragon. One of his ancestors, Martín de Iturbide, was designated as Royal Merino in the High Valley of Baztan in the 1430s, and thereafter many in the family held political or administrative positions in the Basque Country from the 15th century. As a younger son, Joaquín was not in line to inherit the family lands, so he migrated to New Spain to make his fortune there. While the aristocratic and Spanish lineage of Agustín's father was not in doubt, his mother's ancestry was less clear.

His mother, María Josefa Arambúru Carrillo de Figueroa, was of pure Spanish blood born in Mexico, and therefore, a criolla. Some sources state she came from a high-ranking family in Michoacán. In the Spanish colonial era, racial caste was important to advancement, including military rank, and having some indigenous ancestry was often regarded as a disadvantage. Iturbide insisted throughout his life that he was criollo (native born of Spanish descent).

Agustín studied at the Catholic seminary called Colegio de San Nicolás in Valladolid, enrolled in the program for secular officials, though he was not a distinguished student. After that, he worked as an overseer at one of his family's haciendas for a short time, discovering he was a very good horseman.

Iturbide entered the royal army in 1805, commissioned as a second lieutenant in the Valladolid regiment of the provincial infantry. In 1806, he was promoted to full lieutenant.

== Marriage and family ==
In 1805, when he was twenty-two, Iturbide married Doña Ana María Josefa Ramona de Huarte y Muñiz, member of the House of Tagle of the family of the Marquises of Altamira. She came from Valladolid, from a prosperous family of businessmen and landowners. She was the daughter of wealthy and powerful noble Isidro de Huarte, governor of the district, and the granddaughter of the Marquis of Altamira. With her dowry of 100,000 pesos, the couple bought the Hacienda of San José de Apeo in the small town of Maravatío, not far from property owned by Father Miguel Hidalgo, who became leader of the insurgency for independence in 1810. Iturbide had a longstanding friendship and had business dealings with the wealthy Mexico City beauty María Ignacia Rodríguez, known as La Güera Rodríguez ("Rodríguez the Fair"), who supported the insurgency for independence.

== Military career ==
In the early 19th century, there was political unrest in New Spain. One of Iturbide's first military campaigns was to help put down a mutiny, headed by Gabriel J. de Yermo.

He quickly grew in popularity amongst the royalists, whilst becoming a feared foe for the Insurgents. A peerless horseman and a valiant dragoon who acquired a reputation for achieving victory against numerical odds, his prowess in the field gained him the nom de guerre of "El Dragón de Hierro" or "The Iron Dragon", in reference to his skill and position in the army. He was given an important charge in the army. However, he was accused by locals of using his authority for financial gain although he was recognized as valiant in combat. Those accusations could not be proved but cost him his post. He turned down the offer to reclaim his post since he felt that his honor had been damaged. He may have been involved in the initial conspiracy to declare independence in 1809 that was headed by José Mariano Michelena in Valladolid. It is known by his and Hidalgo's documents that he was a distant relative of Miguel Hidalgo, the initial leader of the Insurgent Army. Hidalgo wrote to Iturbide, offering him a higher rank in his army. Iturbide writes in his memoirs that he considered the offer, but that ultimately turned it down because he considered Hidalgo's uprising ill-executed and his methods barbaric.

== Combating insurgency ==
=== 1810–1816 ===
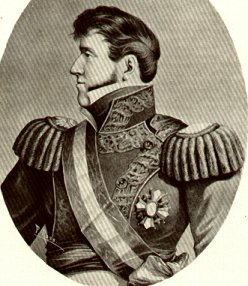
Iturbide

After the outbreak of the War of Independence in 1810, leader of the insurgency, Father Miguel Hidalgo y Costilla, offered Iturbide the rank of lieutenant general in the insurgent forces, which Iturbide rejected, remaining firmly a royal army officer at the outbreak of the war. From the start, Iturbide was ambitious and compiled a brilliant record of victories against the insurgents, often against far larger numbers. He was also well known by contemporaries of all factions for his cruelty against his opponents, the insurgents themselves as well as their families, including women and children.

One of Agustín's first encounters with the rebel army was in the Toluca Valley in 1810 as it advanced toward Mexico City from Valladolid. Royalist and rebel forces engaged on the east bank of the Lerma River at the end of October in what is now known as the Battle of Monte de las Cruces. Royalist forces, under the command of Colonel Torcuato Trujillo, withdrew from the area, allowing rebels to take Toluca. Despite the loss by his side, Iturbide distinguished himself in this battle for valor and tenacity. He would later maintain in his memoirs that it was the only battle he considered to have lost (in which he was directly involved).

Iturbide's next major encounter with the rebels would be against José María Morelos himself and in his native city of Valladolid. Iturbide led the defenders. He demonstrated his tactical skill and horsemanship by breaking Morelos's siege of the town with a well-executed cavalry charge that caused the insurgent forces to withdraw into the forest. For that action, Iturbide was promoted to captain.

As a captain, he pursued rebel forces in the area, managing to capture Albino Licéaga y Rayón, leading to another promotion. In 1813, Viceroy Félix María Calleja promoted Iturbide to colonel and put him in charge of the regiment in Celaya. Then, in 1814, he was named the commander of forces in the Bajío area of Guanajuato, where he continued to pursue the rebels with vigor in a strongly contested area, and was Morelos's principal military opponent from 1813 to 1815.

The next major encounter between Morelos and Iturbide occurred in a town called Puruarán, Michoacán, on 5 January 1814. In the battle, rebel forces were soundly defeated by forces led by Iturbide, forcing Morelos to retreat to the Hacienda of Santa Lucía and to leave Mariano Matamoros and Ignacio López Rayón in command of the rebel army, with over 600 insurgents killed and 700 captured. That marked a turn in the war as Morelos would never again achieve the same level of competency as he had before this defeat. Iturbide and other Spanish commanders relentlessly pursued Morelos, capturing and executing him in late 1815.

=== Relieved of command ===
Iturbide's fortunes reversed after his victory when a number of accusations of cruelty and corruption surfaced.

Iturbide's persistence against the rebels was widely known as well as his views against their liberal, anti-monarchical politics. In his diary, he refers to the insurgents as "perverse," "bandits," and "sacrilegious." In a letter to the viceroy in 1814, he wrote of how he had 300 rebels, to whom he referred as excommunicates, executed to celebrate Good Friday. Iturbide was also criticized for his arbitrariness and his treatment of civilians, in particular his jailing of the mothers, wives, and children of known insurgents. In 1814, he had captured 100 women and incarcerated them into different houses in order to be "re-educated". As for corruption, the Count of Pérez Galvez extensively testified that profiteering by many royalist officers, of whom Iturbide was the most visible, was draining the effectiveness of the royal army. Iturbide acquired a large personal fortune before 1816 by questionable dealings. Some of those shady practices included creating commercial monopolies in areas that he controlled militarily. Other accusations against Iturbide included sacking private property and embezzling military funds. In 1816, the viceroy relieved Iturbide of his command for corruption and cruelty. However, one year later, with the support of an auditor named Bataller, and staunch monarchists in the viceregal government, the charges were withdrawn. Iturbide's supporters further convinced the viceroy that he was needed to vanquish the last remaining rebel leader. However, Iturbide never forgot the humiliation of his dismissal.

=== Against Vicente Guerrero ===
Iturbide was fully reinstated to military command in November 1820 by viceroy Juan Ruiz de Apodaca. He was reinstated as colonel of the royalist army and general of the south of New Spain. For a couple of years after the defeat of Morelos at Puruarán, the independence movement had diminished significantly. However, Iturbide was given the task of putting down the remaining insurrectionist movement southwest of Mexico City led by Vicente Guerrero. Iturbide installed his headquarters at Teloloapan. For more than a century, historians believed that Iturbide had first attempted to carry out his duty in destroying Guerrero but that he met with failure and so decided to strike an alliance with the rebel. However, in 2006, new evidence was discovered by Mexican historian Jaime del Arenal Fenochio: a letter between the two military leaders dated 20 November 1820, which also referenced a previous letter. Since communications had been proven to have existed between the two leaders before Iturbide ever set out to seek out Guerrero, it is now believed that both were then carrying out negotiations. Regardless, some encounters between the two military forces were unavoidable, as the troops of Guerrero and Pedro Ascencio (another insurgent leader) managed to force Iturbide's rear guard to withdraw from an ambush. In their further correspondence, Iturbide and Guerrero lament the clashes, and Iturbide further attempts to convince Guerrero of his intentions of liberating Mexico.

== Switching sides ==
=== Criollo rebellion ===
From 1810 to 1820, Iturbide had fought against those who sought to overturn the Spanish monarchy and Bourbon dynasty's right to rule New Spain and replace that regime with an independent government. He was solidly aligned with the Criollos. However, events in Spain caused problems, as the very monarchy for which that class was fighting was in serious trouble. The 1812 Cadiz Constitution, which was reinstated in Spain in 1820 after the successful Riego revolt, established a constitutional monarchy, which greatly limited Ferdinand VII's powers. There was serious concern in Mexico that the Bourbons would be forced to abandon Spain altogether. That led to the disintegration of viceregal authority in Mexico City, and a political vacuum developed that the Mexican nobility sought to fill, seeking limited representation and autonomy for themselves within the empire. An idea arose in the class that if Mexico became independent or autonomous, and Ferdinand were deposed, he could become king of Mexico.

=== Alliance with Guerrero ===
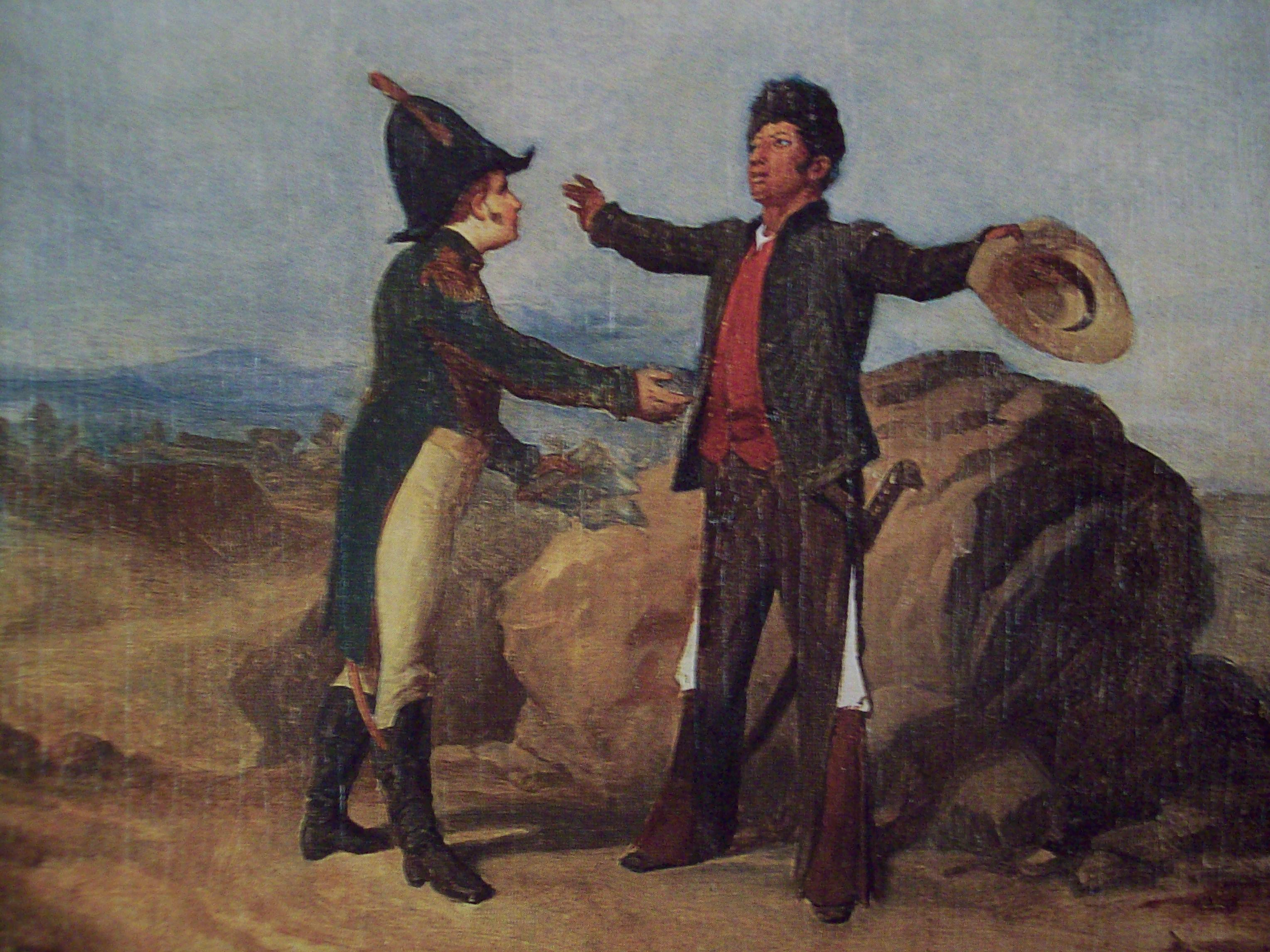
Embrace of Acatempan, between Iturbide (left) and Guerrero (right), by Ramón Sagredo

Iturbide was convinced that independence for Mexico was the only way to protect the country from a republican tide. He decided to become the leader of the Criollo independence movement. However, to succeed, he would need to put together a very-unlikely coalition of Mexican liberal insurgents, landed nobility, and the Church. Therefore, he penned The Plan of Iguala, which held itself up on Three Guarantees: Freedom (from Spain), Religion (with Catholicism being the only accepted religion in the new country) and Union (with all inhabitants of México to be regarded as equals). In that manner, he was paving the road to gaining the support of the most powerful factions: the insurgents, the clergy and the Spaniards. The plan envisioned a monarchy, thus assuring the support of the royalists as well. Iturbide held a series of negotiations with Guerrero and made a number of demonstrations of his intentions to form an independent Mexico. Iturbide offered Guerrero a full pardon if he surrendered. Guerrero rejected the pardon but agreed to meet with Iturbide to discuss the independence of Mexico. In the "Embrace of Acatempán", named after the locale, they agreed to implement the plan, which was made public on 24 February 1821 by Iturbide, Guerrero, and another insurgent leader, Guadalupe Victoria. On 1 March 1821, Iturbide was proclaimed head of the Army of the Three Guarantees, with Guerrero fully supporting him and recognizing him as his leader.

=== Plan of Iguala ===
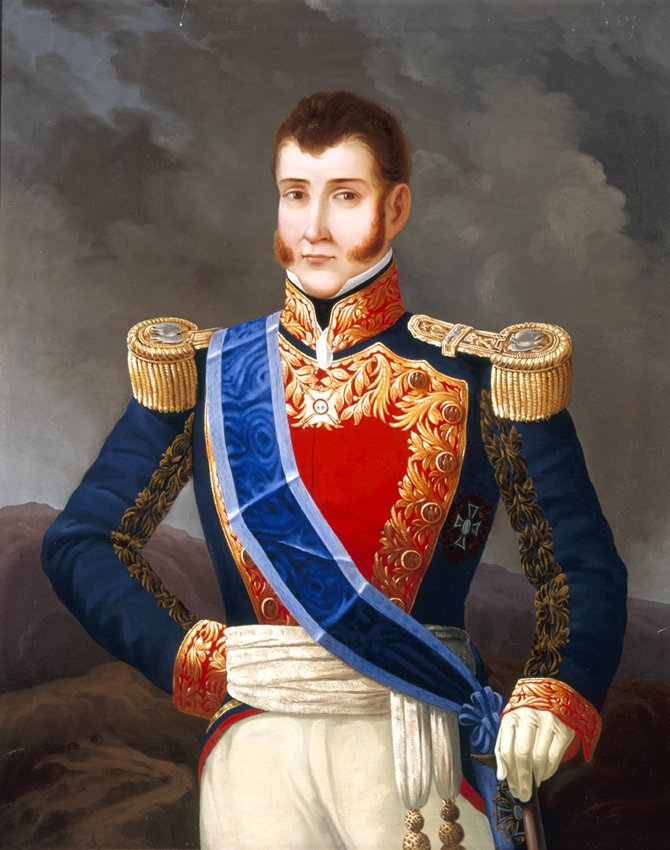
Oil portrait of Agustín de Iturbide.

The plan was a rather vague document that sought the transition of the center of power in New Spain from Madrid to Mexico City. Essentially, the idea was to bring Ferdinand VII to Mexico City to rule. If he did not come to Mexico, another member of the Bourbon royal family would be chosen to rule there. If no European ruler would come to rule México, the nation would have the right to elect a ruler by its own people. To attract the disparate parties involved in the scheme, the plan offered three guarantees: Mexico would be independent from Madrid, Roman Catholicism would be the official religion, and all inhabitants of the new nation, later México, would be considered equals, with no distinction being made between Spaniards, Creoles, Mestizos, etc., thus eliminating the complicated caste system that had been used until then and abolishing the use of slaves in the territory of the new nation as well.

The promise of independence convinced the insurgents to accept the proposal. The promise of the supremacy of the Roman Catholic Church was offered to the clergy, who were frightened by anticlerical policies of Spanish Liberalism. The offer of equality between Criollos and the Spanish-born Peninsulares assured the latter that they and their property would be safe in the new state. That was important because the Peninsulares owned a significant part of the valuable real estate and many of the businesses in Mexico. If the Spaniards had left, that would have been disastrous for the Mexican economy.

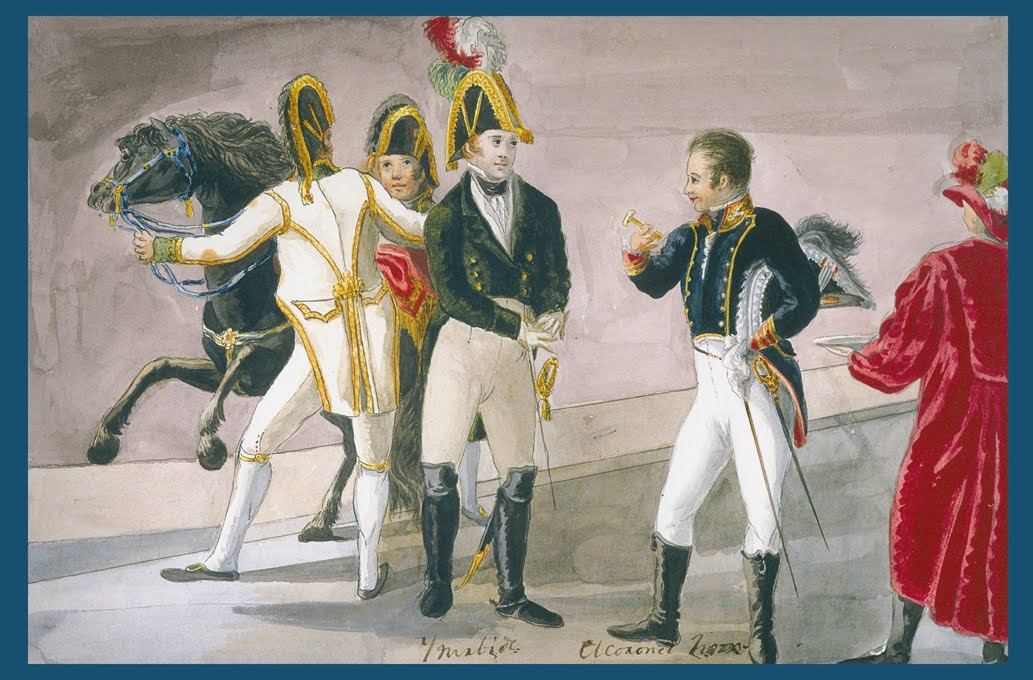
General Iturbide receives the keys to the Mexico City of Colonel Hormaechea.

The plan gained wide support because it demanded independence without attacking the landed classes and did not threaten social dissolution. Therefore, Iturbide succeeded in bringing together old insurgents and royalist forces to fight against the new Spanish government and what was left of the viceregal government. Military leaders, soldiers, families, villages, and towns that had been fighting against one another for almost ten years found themselves joining forces to gain Mexican independence. However, their reasons for joining together were very different, and those differences would later foment the turmoil that occurred after independence.

Both the sitting viceroy and Fernando VII rejected the Plan of Iguala. The Spanish parliament sent a new "viceroy," Juan O'Donojú, to Mexico. (Technically, the office of viceroy had been replaced by a "superior political chief" under the 1812 Spanish Constitution.) O'Donojú, however, arrived to witness a nation on the brink of achieving independence and knew that its consummation could not be stopped.

== Independence and early transition ==
Flag of the Mexican Empire Regency (1821–1822).

Iturbide met with O'Donojú and Field Marshall Francisco Novella to negotiate the final terms of capitulation at the landed estate of his longtime friend, Doña María Ignacia Rodríguez de Velasco (La Güera Rodríguez). The hastily negotiated Treaty of Córdoba was similar in terms of its outcomes to the Plan de Iguala—the document tried to guarantee an independent monarchy for New Spain under the Bourbon dynasty. The successor state would invite Ferdinand VII to rule as emperor or, if he defaulted, his brother Don Carlos. If both refused, a suitable monarch would be sought among the various European royal houses. In the meantime, a regency would replace the viceroy. All existing laws, including the 1812 Constitution, would remain in force until a new constitution for Mexico was written. A key element was added at O'Donojú's suggestion: if Spain refused its right to appoint a regent for the Mexican Empire, the Mexican congress would have freedom to elect whomever it deemed worthy as emperor. That crucial clause was not in Iturbide's Plan de Iguala, a point against the argument that Iturbide entertained the notion of becoming the ruler when he started his campaign for Mexico's independence.

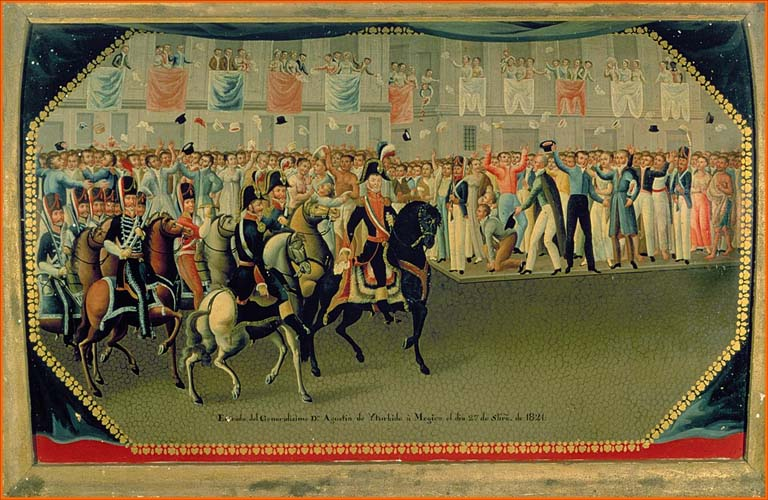
Iturbide's triumphal entrance to Mexico City

To show the military might of the alliance, Iturbide co-ordinated with associated royalist and insurgent commanders in the provinces, opting for a replay of the strategy of closing in on Mexico City from the periphery, which Morelos had attempted in 1811–14. However, Iturbide had the advantage of having most of the former royalist army on his side. Iturbide marched into Mexico City on 27 September 1821, his own birthday, with the Army of the Three Guarantees. The army was received by a jubilant populace who had erected arches of triumph and decorated houses and themselves with the tricolor (red, white, and green) of the army. Cries of "¡Viva Iturbide I!" were heard first on that day. The next day, Mexico was declared an independent empire.

What remained of the royalist army retreated to Veracruz and was cornered in the fortress of San Juan de Ulúa, and O'Donoju, who had been assured an important position in the government of the new empire, died shortly afterwards, dishonored by his Spaniard compatriots.

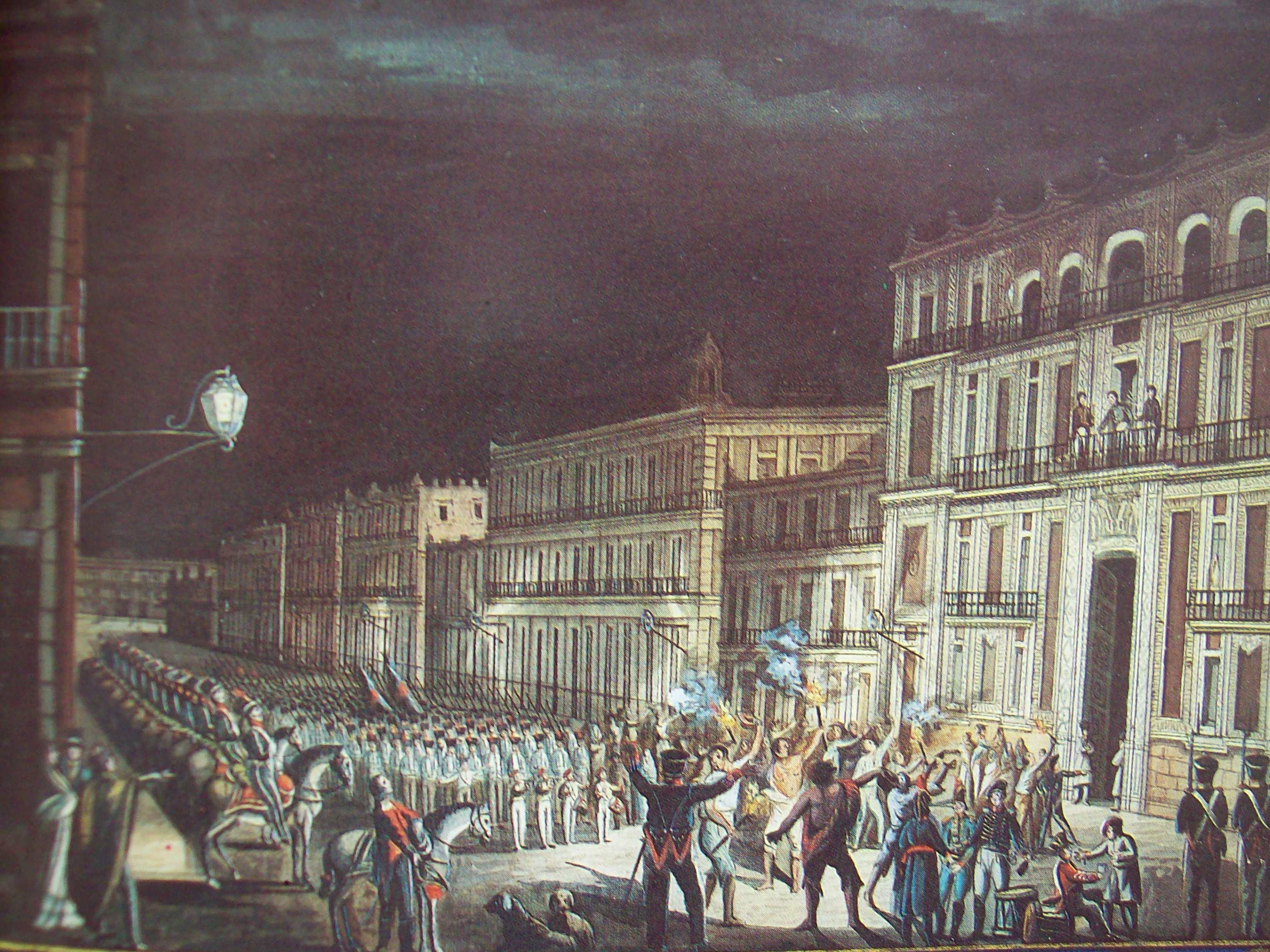
Proclamation of Iturbide the 19 May 1822.

Iturbide was named President of the Provisional Governing Junta, which selected the five-person regency that would temporarily govern the newly independent Mexico. The junta had 36 members who would have legislative power until the convocation of a congress. Iturbide controlled both the membership of the junta and the matters that it considered. The junta would be responsible for negotiating the offer of the throne of Mexico to a suitable royal. Members of the former insurgent movement were left out of the government.

This new government was overwhelmingly loyal to Iturbide. Opposition groups included the old insurgents as well as a number of progressives and those loyal to Ferdinand VII. Many liberals and progressives also belonged to Masonic lodges of the Scottish Rite, leading these branches of the opposition to be called escoceses (Scots). The plan of Iguala was a compromise of the differing factions, but after independence, it became clear that some of the promises it had made would prove very difficult, if not impossible, to accomplish. This state of affairs started to lead to turmoil, even among those in power.

Iturbide moved back to Mexico City and settled himself in a large palatial home that now bears the name Palace of Iturbide. The mansion was lent to him by the family that owned it but was not living in it.

Iturbide began to live extravagantly. He demanded preference for his army and also personally chose ministers. In the meantime, Ferdinand VII rejected the offer of the Mexican throne and forbade any of his family from accepting the position, and the Spanish Cortes rejected the Treaty of Córdoba, granting Mexico its independence.

== Emperor Agustín I ==
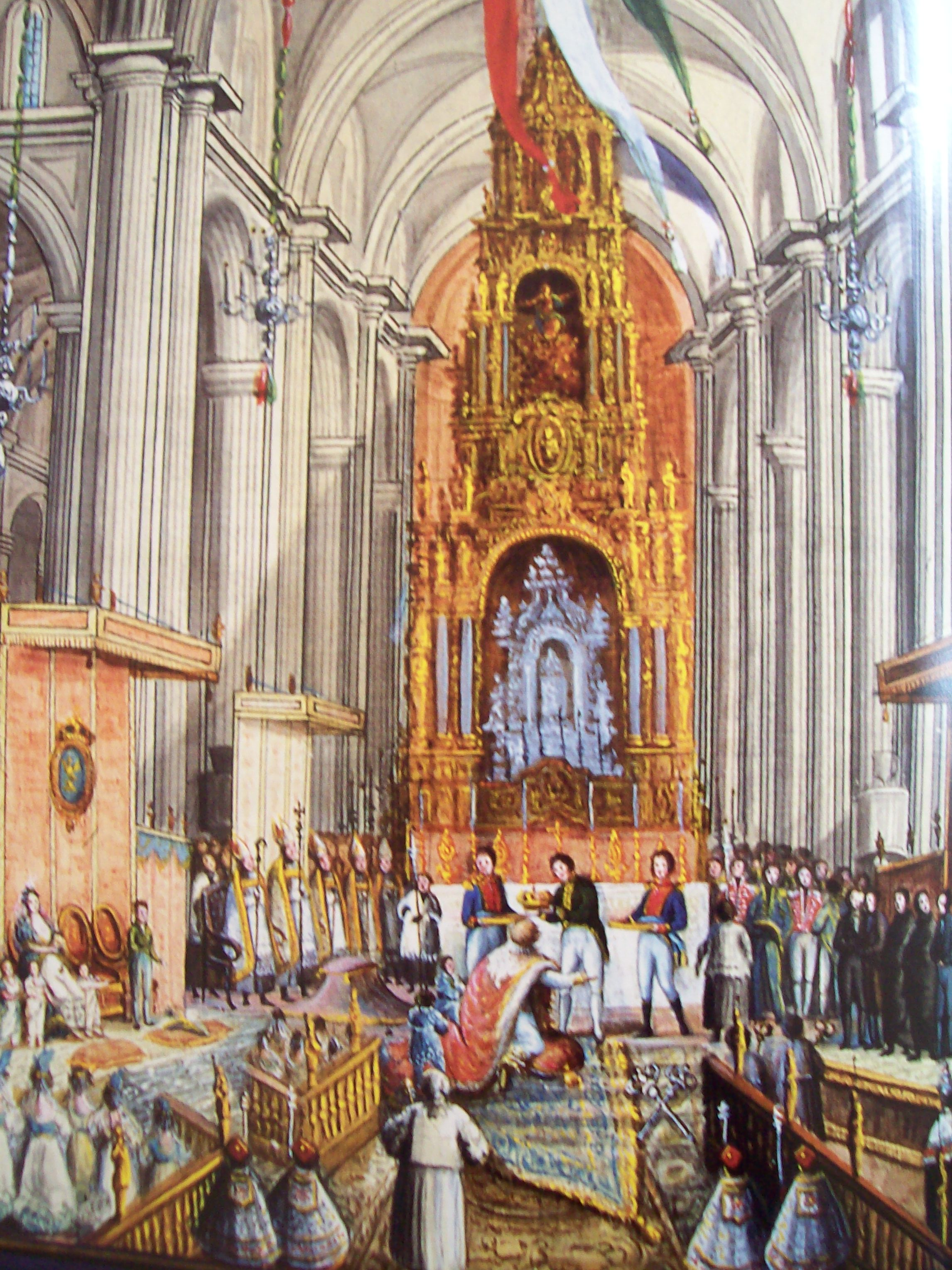
Coronation of Iturbide in 1822 at the foot of the high altar of the Cathedral of Mexico City.

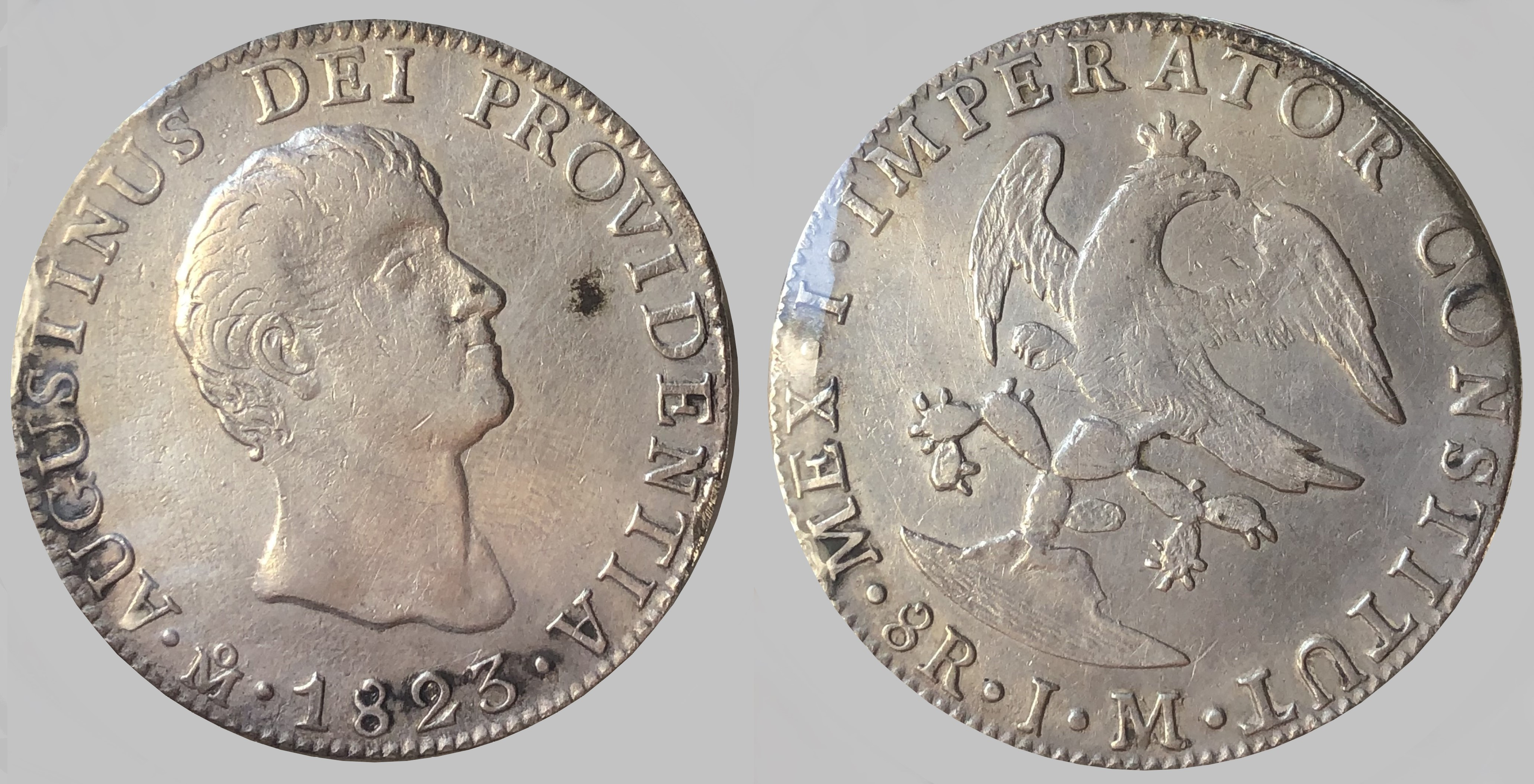
First Mexican Empire 8 reales portrait of Agustín de Iturbide, (Mexico City mint).

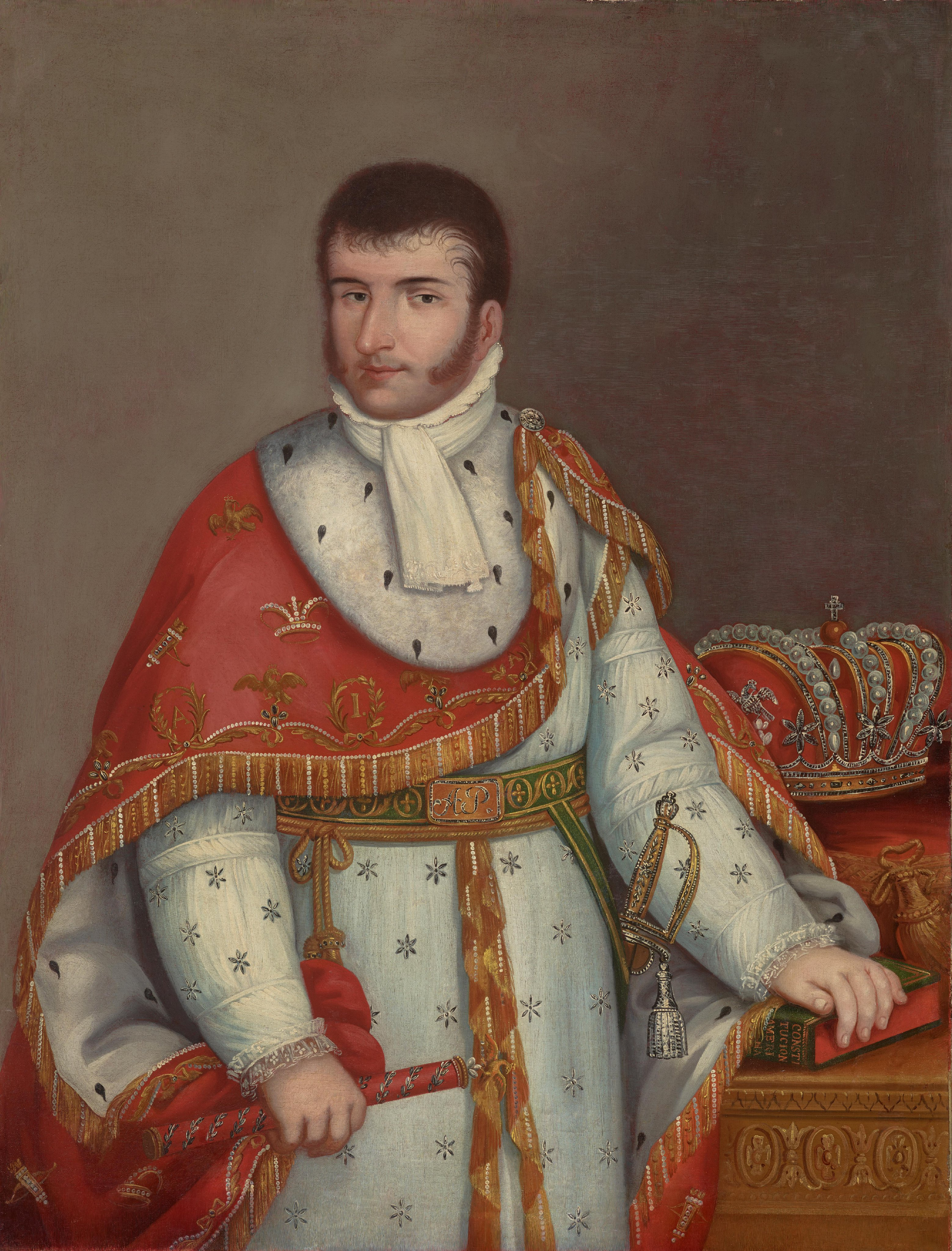
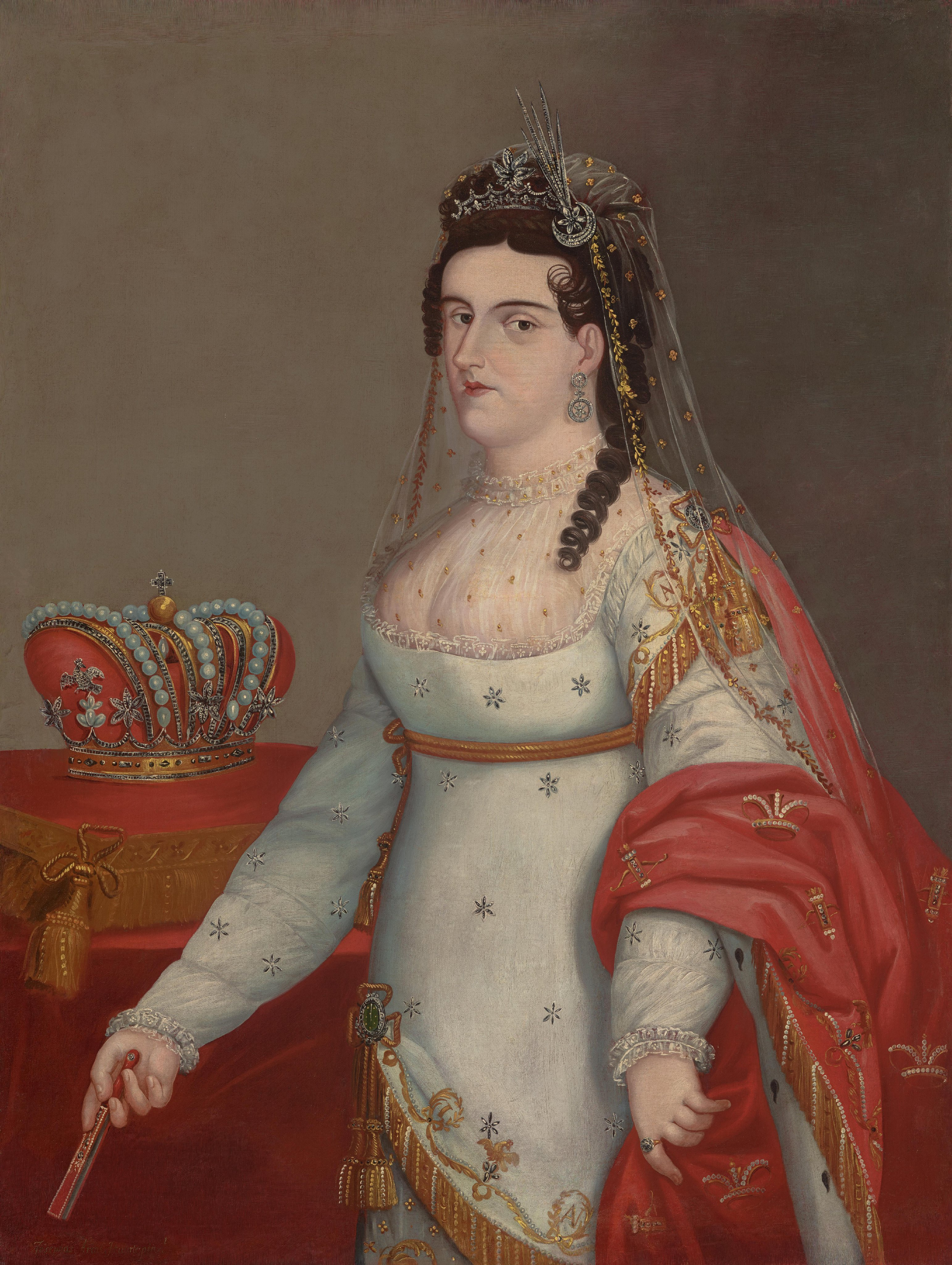
A half-length portrait of Mexican Emperor Agustín I and Empress Ana María Huarte de Iturbide, both pictures attributed to Josephus Arias Huerta, 1822.

Shortly after signing the Treaty of Córdoba, the Spanish government reneged. Ferdinand VII had regained the upper hand against the liberals in Spain and increased his influence outside the country. He even had credible plans for the reconquest of the old colony. For those reasons, no European noble would accept the offer of a Mexican crown. In Mexico itself, there was no Mexican noble family that the populace would accept as imperiality.

In the meantime, the governing junta that Iturbide headed convened a constituent congress to set up the new government. The new government had indirect representation, based on the Cadiz model, but the Plan of Iguala and the Treaty of Córdoba were clear that the order of things would be kept as it had been before the Cadiz Constitution. Thus, Iturbide and the junta declared that they would not be bound by the Cadiz Constitution but kept the Congress that was convened. That led to division, which came to a head in February 1822. In its inauguration, Congress swore that it would never abide for all of the powers of the state to fall into the hands of a single person or entity. It, however, proceeded to assign sovereignty to itself, rather than to the people, and proclaimed that it held all three powers of the State. It also considered lowering military pay and decreasing the size of the army. Those moves threatened to reduce Iturbide's influence in current and future governments.

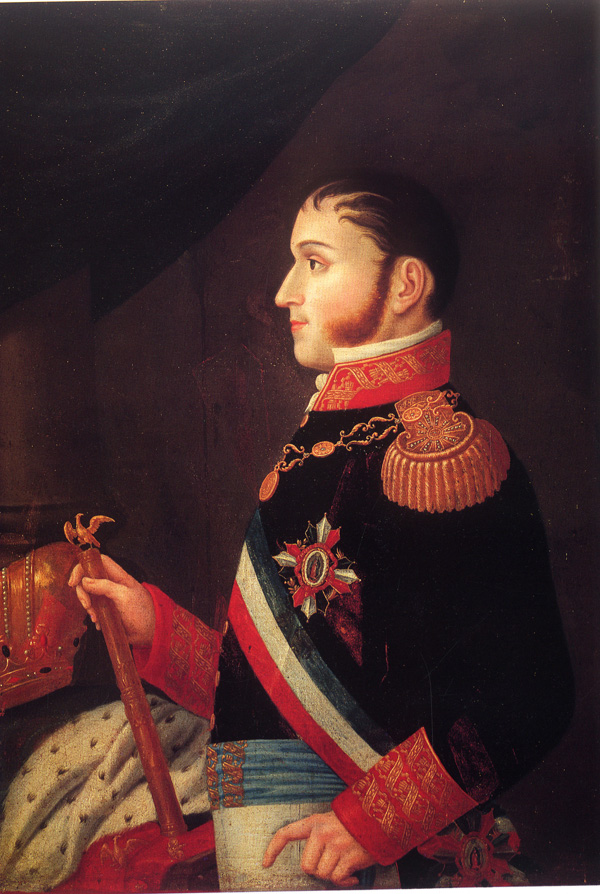
Half-length portrait as Emperor of Mexico

That led to political destabilization, which was resolved temporarily when Iturbide was elected Emperor of the Mexican nation. However, it is not clear whether he took the crown at the insistence of the people or simply took advantage of the political situation.

Some call Iturbide's decision a coup and state that the public support for him was orchestrated by him and his followers. Others insist that the people's offer of the throne was sincere, as there was no other candidate and the people were grateful to him for the liberation of Mexico. The latter accounts stress that Iturbide initially rejected the offer, in favor of persuading Ferdinand VII to change his mind about ruling Mexico, but then reluctantly accepted. When the liberating army entered Mexico on 27 September 1821, the army sought to proclaim Iturbide as Emperor, which he himself stopped. A month later, on 28 October, he was publicly proclaimed Emperor by the people but again refused any such attempt.

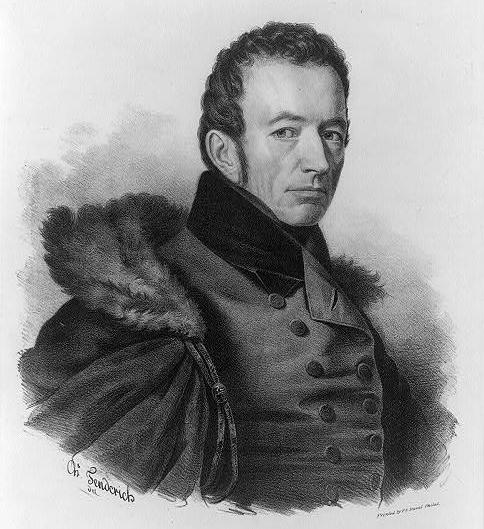
Joel Roberts Poinsett, U.S. Special Envoy to Mexico

The US government appointed Joel Roberts Poinsett as a special envoy to independent Mexico when Iturbide was declared emperor since James Monroe was concerned about how popular and long-lasting the regime might be. Poinsett indicated the empire was not likely to be enduring, but the US still recognized Mexico as an independent country. Poinsett's Notes on Mexico are an important source as a foreign view of Iturbide's regime. Poinsett also took advantage of the opportunity to proposition Iturbide's government on the issue of the US wish of acquiring Mexico's northern territories but was soundly refused.

Famed Mexican author José Joaquín Fernández de Lizardi, El Pensador ("the Mexican Thinker"), the author of El Periquillo Sarniento, wrote about the subject at the time: "If your excellency be not the Emperor, then our Independence be damned. We do not wish to be free if your excellency will not be at the lead of his countrymen." Timothy E. Anna points out that in the months between the achievement of Independence and his crowning as Emperor, Iturbide already practically ruled the nation, as he was president of the Regency, and the junta had granted him command over all land and sea forces. He was appointed protector of commerce, navigation, local order and ports and was given the right to expedite passports and navigation licenses even after the Emperor had been instated (and according to the Emperor's wishes). Iturbide had what he could have possibly wanted before becoming Emperor, Anna notes, and so it is not probable that Iturbide conspired to appoint himself Emperor. Iturbide himself notes in his memoirs written in exile: "I had the condescension–or, call it weakness—of allowing myself to be seated in a throne I had created for others."

Historians point out that Iturbide had quite possibly all the power, influence, and support he needed before redacting the Plan of Iguala, to crown himself Emperor, and he still wrote the Plan with the clear intention of creating a throne meant for a European noble.

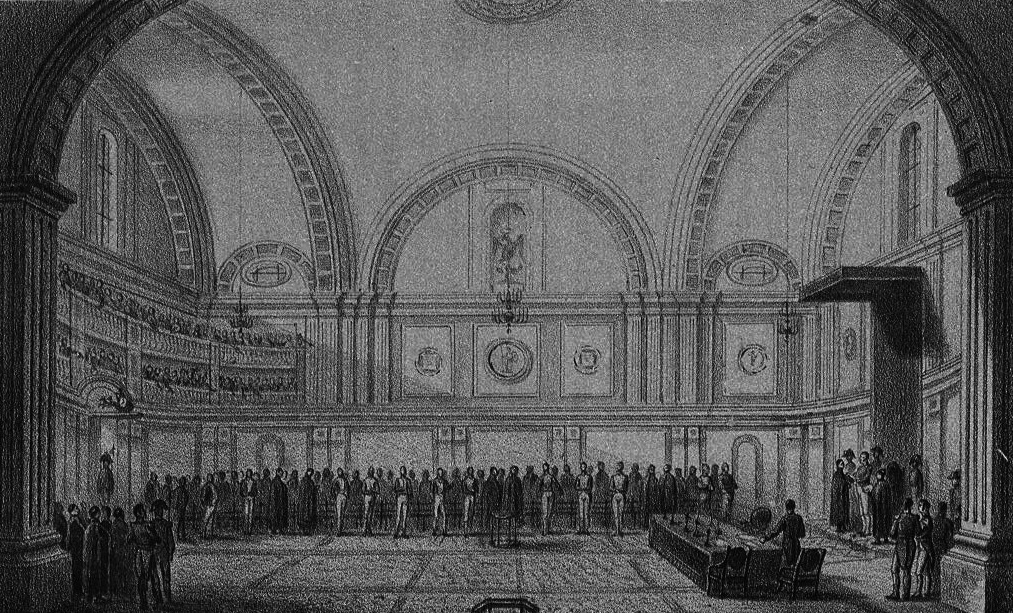
Lithography of the Oath of Iturbide Constitutional Emperor of Mexico (1822).

Most historical accounts mention the crowd that gathered outside what is now the Palace of Iturbide in Mexico City shouting "Viva Iturbide!" and insist for him to take the throne of Mexico in May 1822. The crowd included Iturbide's old regiment from Celaya. Some detractors of Iturbide insist that this demonstration was staged by Iturbide himself or his loyalists. From a balcony of the palace, Iturbide repeatedly denied his desire for the throne. One interesting twist to the story is reported by Mexico City daily La Jornada, which states that Iturbide held the first popular referendum in Mexico. According to the article, Iturbide sent out a questionnaire to military and civilian leaders as to whether the people preferred a republic or a monarchy. The answer came back in favor of a monarchy. Iturbide asked the demonstrators that night to give him the night to think it over, and to respect the wishes of the government. The Congress convened the next day to discuss the matter of Iturbide's election as Emperor. Iturbide's supporters filled the balconies overlooking the chamber. The Congress confirmed him and his title of Agustín I, Constitutional Emperor of Mexico, by a vast majority. After Iturbide's abdication, members would state that it had elected Iturbide out of fear for their lives, as the common folk were present during the vote and loudly proclaimed Iturbide, and no member voted against his crowning as Emperor. However, three days after Iturbide had been elected Emperor, Congress held a private session in which only it was present. It ratified the decision, created titles for the royal family, and declared Iturbide's title to be lifelong and hereditary.

Iturbide's coronation was held at the Mexico City Cathedral on 21 July 1822, and his wife, Ana María, was crowned empress, in an elaborate ceremony. It was attended by the bishops of Puebla, Guadalajara, Durango, and Oaxaca. According to the author Pérez Memen, Archbishop of Mexico Pedro José de Fonte y Hernández Miravete objected and did not attend. Iturbide was crowned by Rafael Mangino y Mendivil, the head of the Congress, in itself a statement by Congress: the state, not the church or any other power, would be sovereign. The Congress decreed the crown to be hereditary with the title of "Prince of the Union." As emperor, Iturbide had sovereignty over lands bordered by Panama in the south and the Oregon Country in the north, including the current countries of Central America and the US states of California, Texas, Arizona, Utah, Nevada, Colorado, and New Mexico. Central America only briefly was part of the Mexican Empire of Iturbide (from 1821 to 1823), because by 1823 the local patriots, both liberal and conservative, made a move for total and absolute independence from Mexico and Spain.

== Downfall ==
=== Dissolution of Congress ===
The republicans were not happy with Iturbide as emperor. While the Catholic clergy supported him, the coronation dashed republican hopes, and while the Plan of Iguala and the Treaty of Córdoba directed that in the event of it being impossible to install a European on the Mexican throne, a national sovereign could be chosen, some of the royalists who had supported Iturbide had hoped for a European ruler. Many of the landed classes supported Iturbide and those documents because they offered a sense of continuity with the past. Iturbide's election to the throne was against their wishes, and many of them withdrew their support for him and conspired against the new empire.

The strongest opposition to Iturbide's reign came from the Congress, where a significant number of its members supported republican ideas. Many of these members also belonged to Masonic lodges, which provided an easy forum for communication. Those ideas found a voice when Manuel Codorniu founded the newspaper El Sol, essentially becoming the in-house publication for the Scottish Rite lodge in its struggle against Iturbide. Iturbide's government was notoriously harsh in turning down territorial negotiations with agents of the US government, as attested by Poinsett. The United States was itself a republic as well, meaning Iturbide's relations with the US were on shaky ground. The Congress, believing itself to be sovereign over the Emperor and the people and the recipient of the executive, legislative, and judicial powers, antagonized Iturbide. The Congress refused to draw up a new monarchical Mexican Constitution with a role for the Emperor. Furthermore, people loyal to the Emperor became aware of a conspiracy that involved several members of the Congress who planned to kidnap the Emperor and his family and overthrow the Empire. As a response to this claimed threat to his life and to combat the resistance, Iturbide dismissed the Congress on 31 October 1822 and two days later created a new junta, the National Institutional Junta, to legislate in its place, answering only to himself.

The National Institutional Junta was directed to create much-needed legislation in economic matters, create a provisional set of laws for the Empire, and then issue a call for a new Constituent Congress. The formulation of the new Congress was changed in how many representatives each Mexican province was granted. The new Congress would also be in charge of issuing a new Mexican Constitution. Iturbide persecuted his enemies, arresting and jailing a score of former members of the Congress, but that did not bring peace.

A number of prominent politicians and military leaders, many of whom had supported Agustín as emperor, turned against him for having "made a mockery of national representation" in the new Congress's composition. Among those were prominent Insurgent leaders Vicente Guerrero, Nicolás Bravo and Guadalupe Victoria.

Meanwhile, Mexico suffered as an independent country. Ferdinand's resurgence as a ruler in Spain and his clear intentions to reconquer Mexico meant that no European nation was willing to recognize Mexico's independence, and most broke off economic ties with the new state. Iturbide's economic policies were draining resources as well. To increase his popularity, he abolished a number of colonial-era taxes. However, he still insisted on a large and very well-paid army and lived extravagantly himself. The elite turned against him when he imposed a 40% property tax.

The situation did not last long. Soon, Iturbide was unable to pay his army, creating discontent in a significant portion of his power base. When criticism of the government grew strong, Iturbide censored the press, an act that backfired against him. Opposition groups began to band together against him. Leaders such as Valentín Gómez Farías and Antonio López de Santa Anna began to conspire against the imperial concept altogether and became convinced that a republican model was needed to combat despotism.

=== Veracruz and the Plan of Casa Mata ===
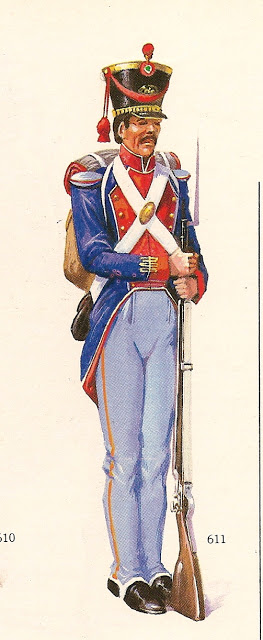
A grenadier of Iturbide's Imperial Guard

Santa Anna publicly opposed Iturbide in December 1822 in the Plan of Veracruz, supported by the old Insurgent hero, Guadalupe Victoria. Santa Anna would later admit in his recollections that at the time, he did not know what a republic was. Iturbide had tried to stop Santa Anna by inviting him to Mexico City. Recognizing the danger of such an invitation, Santa Anna responded with his Plan de Veracruz, which called for the reinstatement of the old Constituent Congress, which would then have the right to decide the form of government of the new nation. Curiously, it did not specifically call for a republic or for the abdication of Iturbide. Santa Anna wrote to Iturbide, explaining his reasons and swearing to sacrifice his own life if it was necessary to ensure the safety of the Emperor. Iturbide's enemy-turned-ally, Vicente Guerrero, turned back to enemy when he and General Nicolás Bravo escaped México City and allied themselves with the rebels. In a proclamation that explained their reasons, they also called for the reinstatement of the disintegrated Congress, which would then decide the fate of the nation. Bravo and Guerrero wrote that they swore to abide by the Congress's decision, even if it decided to stay as a Constitutional Empire and it elected Iturbide again to lead them.

Iturbide sent his most trusted man, his protégé of sorts, General Echávarri, to combat the rebels. Santa Anna considered escaping to the United States but was stopped by Victoria. Santa Anna retreated and fortified himself in the city of Veracruz with his superior artillery. Victoria was separated from Veracruz, fighting behind Imperial lines. Bravo and Guerrero were defeated, with Guerrero suffering such a grievous injury in battle that the nation believed him dead until he resurfaced months later. However, Echávarri and several other imperial officers turned on the empire; away from Mexico City, the loyalty of the imperial armies proved patchy. Santa Anna, joined by republicans Guerrero, and Bravo, and imperial generals Echávarri, Cortázar y Rábago, and Lobato, proclaimed the Plan of Casa Mata, which called for the installation of a new Congress and declared the election of the emperor null and void. Casa Mata also called for giving provinces the right to govern themselves in the interim until the new Congress was formed, an attractive prospect for the provincial governments. They accepted the plan, with the exception of the province of Chiapas. Much of the area now known as Central America declared its opposition to Mexico City and Iturbide's rule. In 1823, authorities in what are now Guatemala, El Salvador, Nicaragua, Costa Rica, and Honduras convened a Congress to declare themselves independent from Mexico and Spain as the United Provinces of Central America.

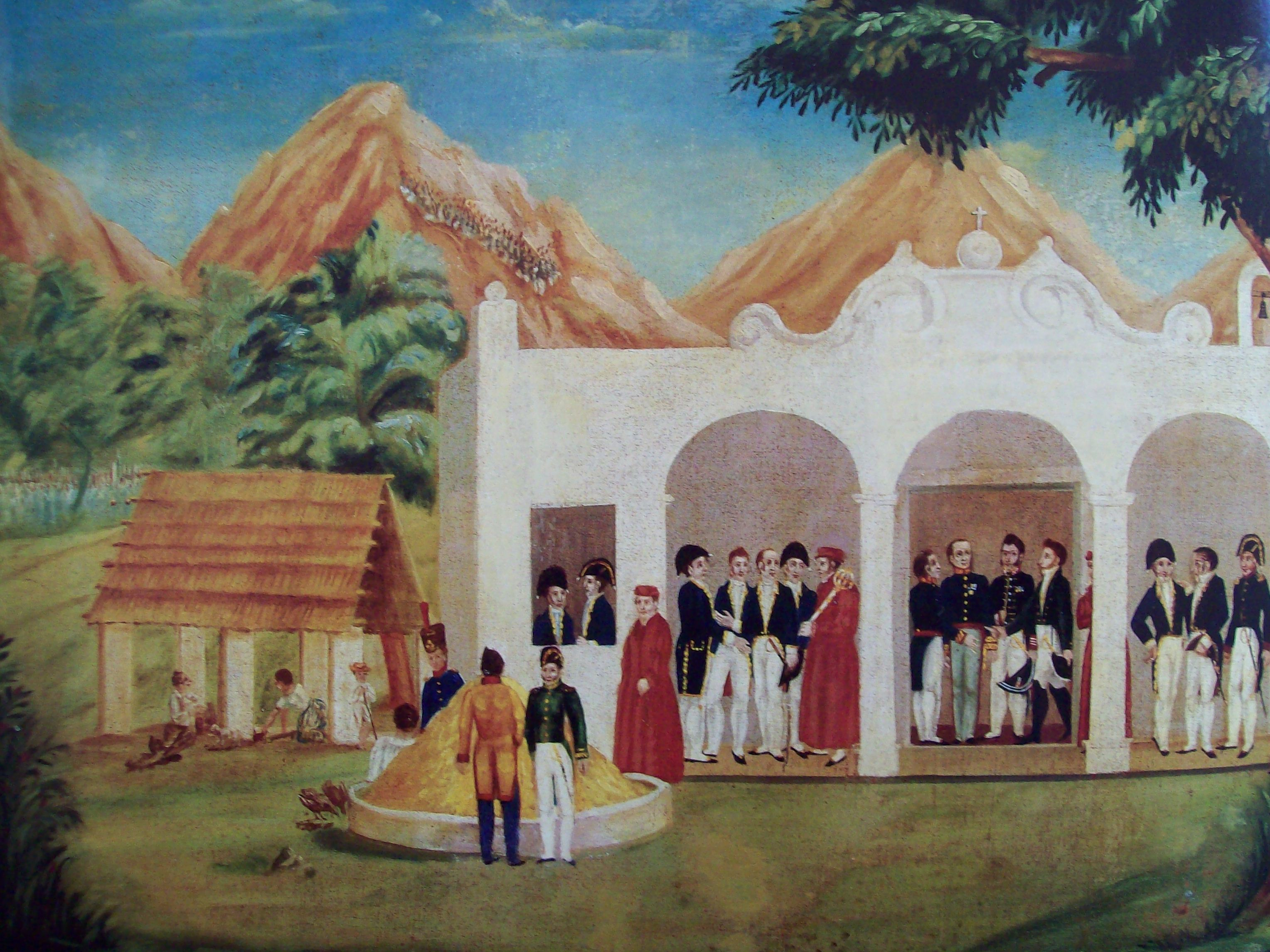
Iturbide meeting Juan O'Donojú in 1821

Santa Anna's army marched toward Mexico City, winning small victories along the way. Iturbide gathered and sent troops to combat Santa Anna who did not put up a strong resistance. Many military leaders who Iturbide appointed turned on him upon contacting Santa Anna's forces. Iturbide later admitted he had made a mistake by not leading his armies himself. Iturbide recognized that although his provisional junta was working to call a new Congress, most of the nation had already accepted the Plan of Casa Mata. Recognizing the wishes of the country, Iturbide personally reopened the same Congress that he had closed in March 1823 and presented his abdication to them. He later wrote that he was choosing abdication over bloody civil war. However, Congress refused to accept his abdication, arguing that acceptance of abdication would imply that the existence of the throne was legitimate. Instead, they nullified their own election of Iturbide as emperor and refused to acknowledge the Plan of Iguala or the Treaty of Córdoba.

Executive leadership of the country was passed to the "triumvirate," made up of the generals Guadalupe Victoria, Nicolás Bravo, and Pedro Celestino Negrete.

== Exile ==
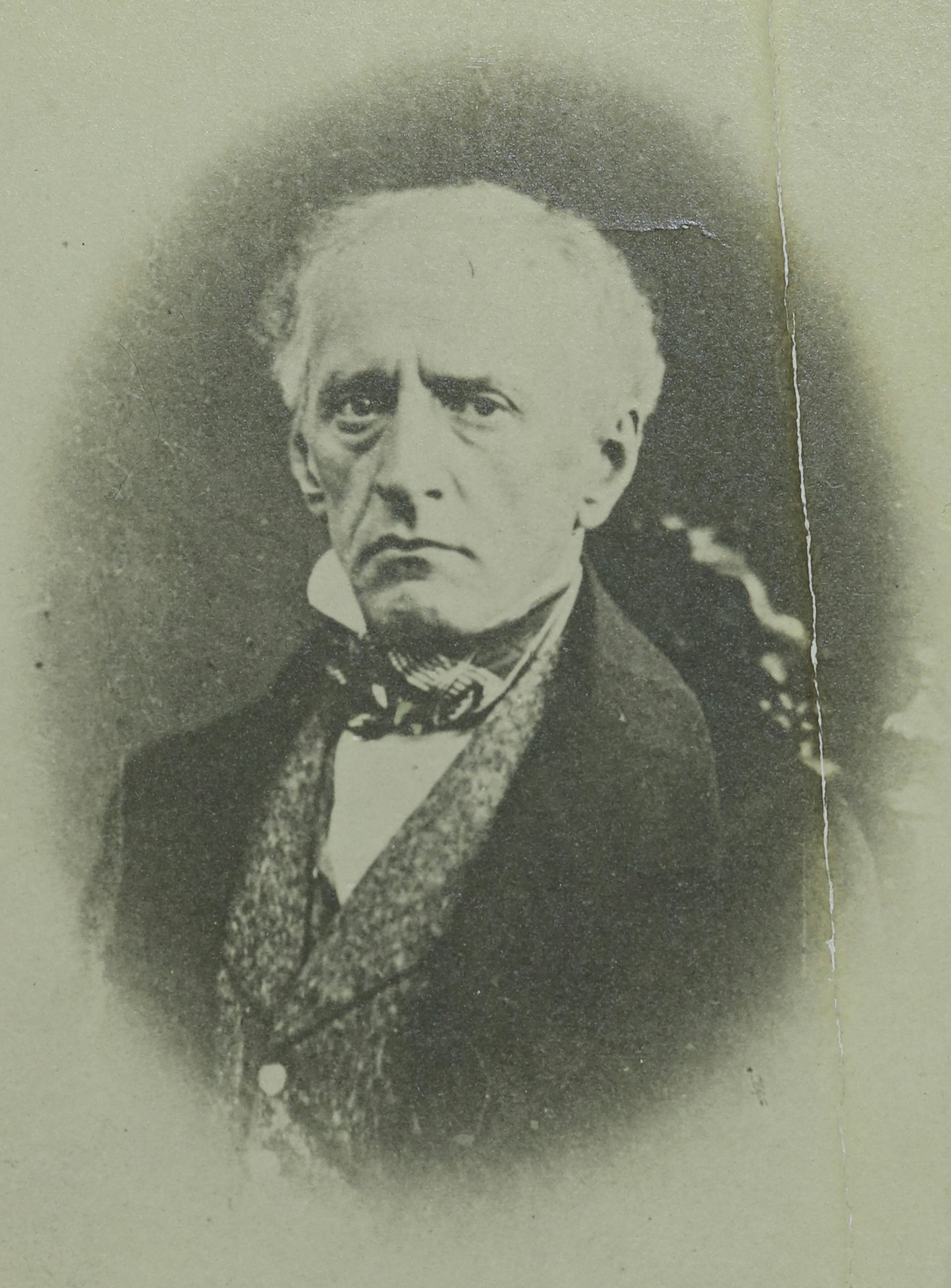
Agustín Jerónimo de Iturbide (firstborn son of Emperor of Mexico), a veteran of the battle of Ayacucho in Colombia, worked at the Mexican legation in London, UK, and later volunteered with the Papal Army.

On his way to exile, Iturbide and his family were escorted by former insurgent leader Nicolás Bravo, who treated Iturbide harshly. Though the republican movement had triumphed, the people still held Iturbide in high regard and greatly admired him. On his way out of the city, his carriage was surrounded by the people, the horses dismissed and the people sought to drag the carriage themselves out of the city. That treatment was customary in the entrances or exits of great figures in or out of a city. The soldiers escorting Iturbide prevented that from happening and would henceforth lead the former emperor on hidden roads, as the government feared a popular rising in favor of Iturbide.

On 11 May 1823, the ex-emperor boarded the British ship Rawlins en route to Livorno, Italy (then part of the Grand Duchy of Tuscany), accompanied by his wife, children, and some servants. There, he rented a small country house and began to write his memoirs, known under the name of Manifiesto de Liorna. Iturbide and his family struggled financially during this time despite claims by historians and some members of the Congress that deposed him that Iturbide had indulged in illegal enrichment throughout his military career and rule. In exile, Iturbide was approached by a Catholic coalition of nations that sought to enlist his help in a campaign to reconquer México for Spain. Iturbide declined. Spain pressured Tuscany to expel Iturbide, and the Iturbide family moved to England.

There, he published his autobiography, Statement of Some of the Principal Events in the Public Life of Agustín de Iturbide. When he was exiled, Iturbide was accorded a government pension, but it was never received by Iturbide. Congress also declared him a traitor and "outside of the law" to be killed if he ever returned to Mexico. Iturbide was unaware of the penalty. After his death, many an author decried the decree calling for Iturbide's death, as it was against all known precepts of the law at the time: it was unheard of that a law could be issued solely against a specific citizen, instead of issuing a general law that would be applied to particular cases.

Reports of a probable further Spanish attempt to retake Mexico reached Iturbide in England. He wrote in his memoirs that he was very worried about the future of Mexico. He continued to receive reports from Mexico and advice from supporters that if he returned he would be hailed as a liberator and a potential leader against the Spanish invasion. Iturbide sent word to congress in Mexico City on 13 February 1824 offering his services in the event of Spanish attack. Congress never replied.

Conservative political factions in Mexico finally convinced Iturbide to return.

== Execution and burial ==
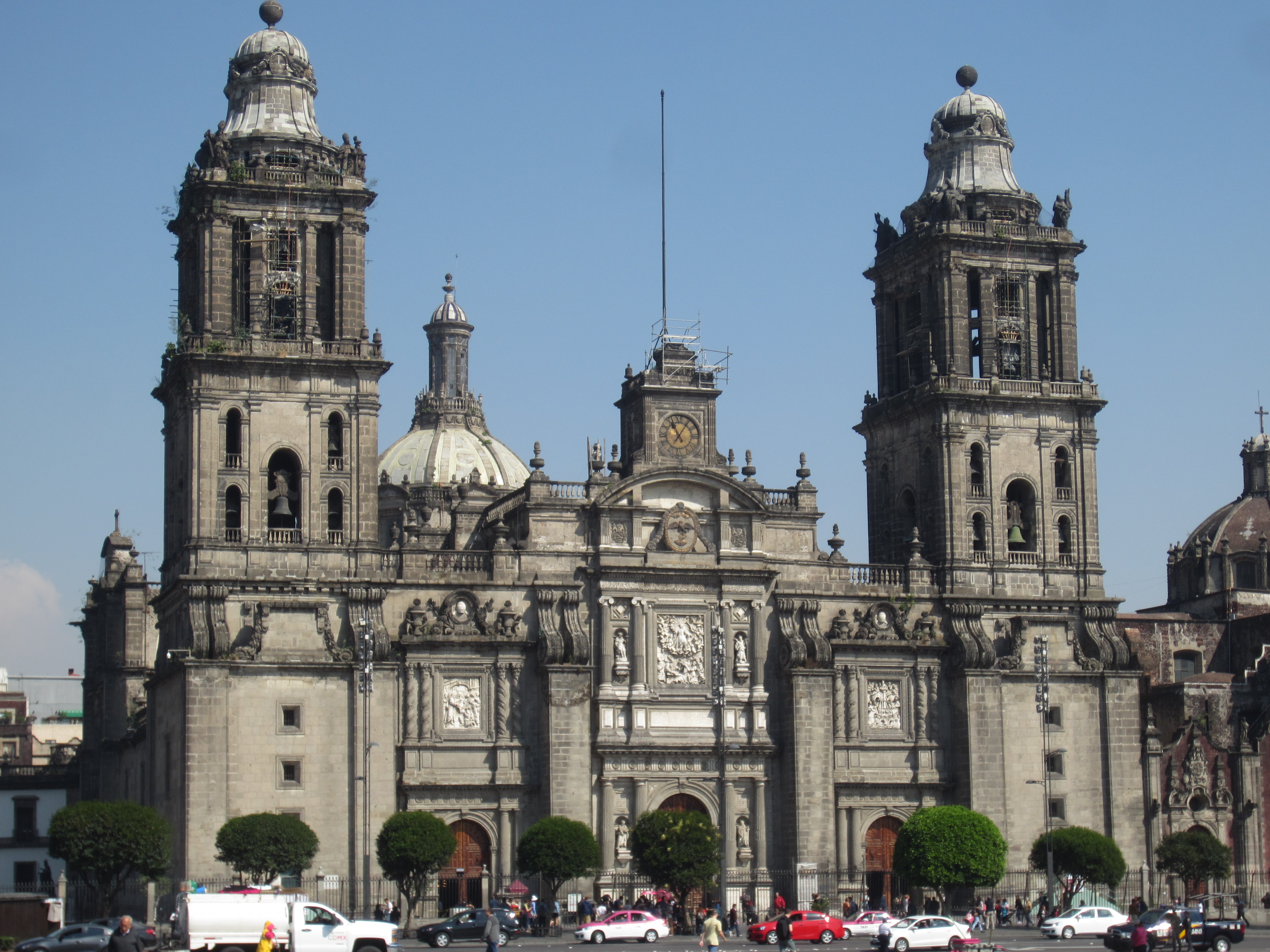
Mexico City Metropolitan Cathedral

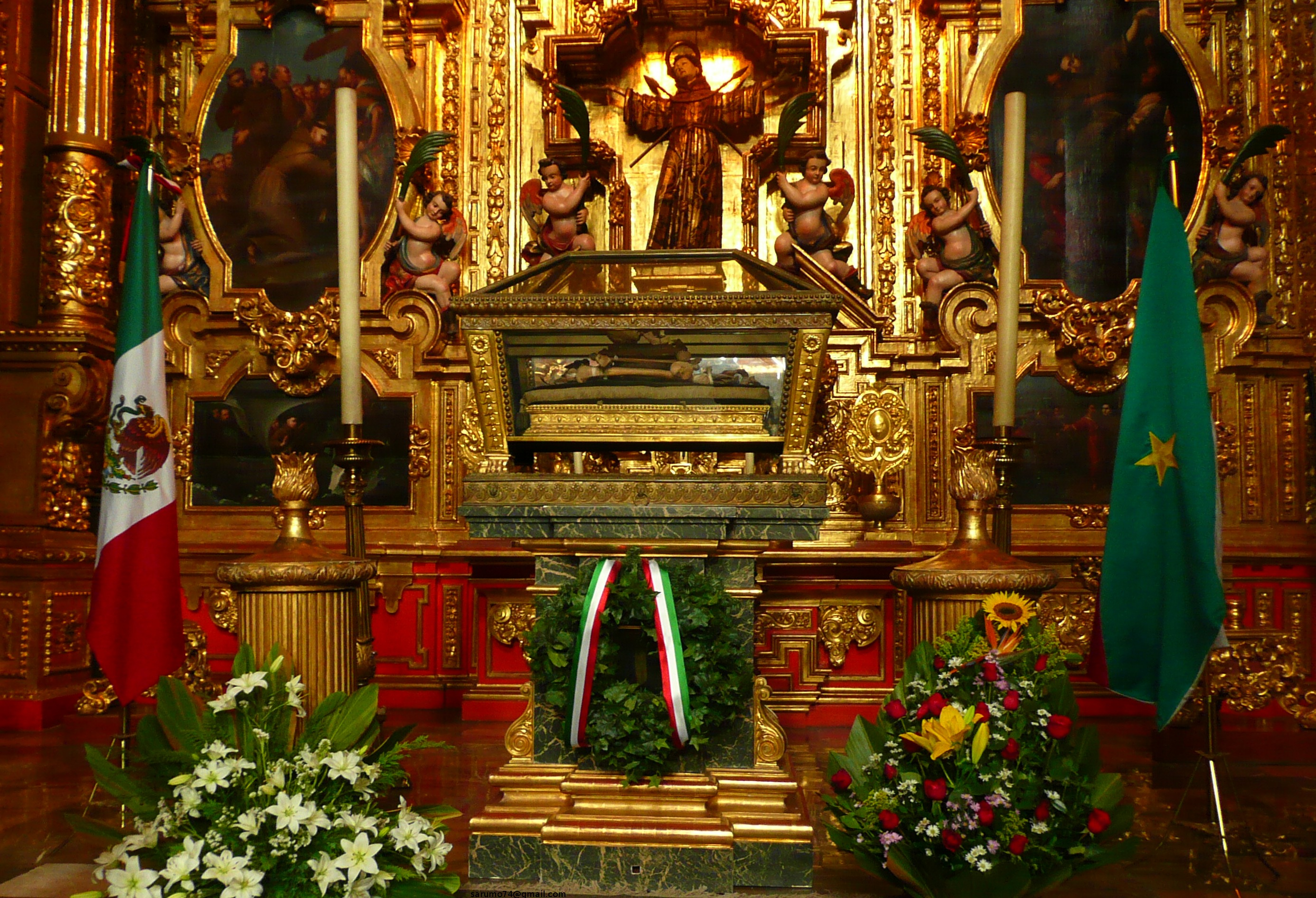
Coffin containing Agustín de Iturbide's remains in Mexico City Metropolitan Cathedral

Iturbide returned to Mexico on 14 July 1824, accompanied by his wife, two children, and a chaplain (Joseph A. Lopez). He landed at the port of Soto la Marina on the coast of Nuevo Santander (the modern-day state of Tamaulipas). He was initially greeted enthusiastically, but was soon arrested by General Felipe de la Garza, the local military commander. Felipe de la Garza had been the head of a short-lived revolt during Iturbide's reign. Iturbide had chosen to pardon the general and reinstate him to his old post. Perhaps it was because of this debt that de la Garza wavered in his resolve to detain Iturbide. On the way to his trial, de la Garza gave Iturbide command over the military escort that accompanied them and requested that Iturbide present himself to the nearby village of Padilla. Iturbide gave his word of honor and surrendered to authorities.

The local legislature held a trial and sentenced Iturbide to death. When a local priest administered last rites, Iturbide said, "Mexicans! In the very act of my death, I recommend to you the love to the fatherland, and the observance to our religion, for it shall lead you to glory. I die having come here to help you, and I die merrily, for I die amongst you. I die with honor, not as a traitor; I do not leave this stain on my children and my legacy. I am not a traitor, no." He was executed by firing squad on 19 July 1824.

The aftermath of his execution was met with indignation by royalists. The sentiment of those horrified by this regicide was compiled by novelist Enrique de Olavarría y Ferrari in "El cadalso de Padilla: "Done is the dark crime, for which we will doubtlessly be called Parricides." His body was buried and abandoned at the parish church of Padilla until 1833. In that year, President Santa Anna, deciding to rehabilitate the memory of Iturbide, ordered that his remains be transferred to the capital with honors. However, it was not until 1838, during the presidency of Anastasio Bustamante, that the order was confirmed and carried out. His ashes were received in Mexico City with much pomp and ceremony, and the same Congress that had been against him for so many years gave him honor as a hero of the War of Independence, if not the short imperial reign after.

On 27 October 1839, his remains were placed in an urn in the Chapel of San Felipe de Jesús in the Mexico City Metropolitan Cathedral, where they remain. On the stand is an inscription in Spanish that translates to "Agustín de Iturbide. Author of the independence of Mexico. Compatriot, cry for him; passerby, admire him. This monument guards the ashes of a hero. His soul rests in the bosom of God."

== Iturbide's role in history ==
Iturbide's reign as emperor lasted less than a year, but as leader of the coalition that brought about Mexican independence and then as its first ruler in the post-independence era, he remains an important figure not only in Mexico, but also in Europe. For a number of Mexican autonomists, a constitutionally sanctioned monarchy was a logical solution to the problem of creating a new state as it seemed to be a compromise between those who pushed for a representative form of government and those who wished to keep Mexico's monarchist traditions. In their view, a republican, federalist government was virtually unheard of; for 300 years New Spain had lived in a monarchy, so a continuation of some form would have aided national stability.

Historian Eric Van Young states that Iturbide's seizure of the crown "seems less cynical and idiosyncratic when it comes along at the end of the independence struggle." Van Young's assessment is that "he demonstrated moments of political brilliance clouded over in the long term by bad judgment and that in the end he was an opportunist."

Iturbide is often described as a reactionary rather than a revolutionary, a view supported by his initial refusal to join Miguel Hidalgo’s independence movement until it aligned with his own interests. His role in the independence movement is frequently shared with that of Vicente Guerrero in educational materials, and his legacy remains controversial. No official acts or public events are typically held to commemorate his ascension or death. The rest of the 19th century in Mexico saw frequent shifts between political extremes, with various factions gaining power at different times. The old Mexican nobility remained influential, and members of the Iturbide family were involved in political intrigue against the Mexican government in Madrid, New York, Paris, and Rome into the 1890s.

Liberal or republican ideas would continue to be embraced by people outside the Mexico City elite. These came out of Bourbon Reforms in Europe that were based on the Enlightenment. Attacks on the Catholic Church by liberals in Spain and elsewhere in Europe were conducted also in Mexico during the Liberal Reform period in the mid-nineteenth century. Ideals of the Constitution of Cadiz would find expression in the 1824 Constitution of Mexico. This constitution would influence political thought on both sides of the Mexican political spectrum, with even Iturbide bending to it when he created the first congress of an independent Mexico. After Iturbide, there was wide general consensus, even among the landed elite, that some form of representative government was needed. The question was how much power would be in legislative hands and how much in an executive.

Iturbide's empire was replaced with the First Mexican Republic. General Guadalupe Victoria was elected the first president, but in subsequent years, General Vicente Guerrero became the first in a long line of Presidents to gain the Presidency through a military revolt after losing an election. Guerrero was betrayed and assassinated, and Santa Anna would rise to avenge him, beginning an era of Mexican history that Santa Anna dominated. This regime would oscillate and finally be overcome by the Plan of Ayutla. The new Government would struggle between anti-clerical, reformist views and conservative views during the Reform War. During the French Intervention the country would face Civil War amongst conservative, Catholic, Europe-adherent monarchists led by the ironically liberal Maximilian I of Mexico, and liberal, masonic, anti-clerical, reformist and United States-adherent liberals led by the American-backed Benito Juárez. Having prevailed, Juárez died after 15 years of forcefully remaining as president. Porfirio Díaz in the late 19th century would install a one-man rule which imposed upon México its first true period of relative peace, in exchange for freedom, and Díaz remaining for the next 30 years in power. He would be overthrown by the Mexican Revolution.

== In historical memory ==
Flag of the First Mexican Empire, 1821–1823

Early in the independence period of Mexico's history, the day used to mark independence was based on one's political stance. Conservatives favored 27 September for celebration, when Iturbide entered Mexico City at the head of the conquering army, but Liberals preferred 16 September to celebrate Hidalgo's call for rebellion against Spain. In modern Mexico, the liberal tendency has dominated, such that much writing about Iturbide is often hostile, seeing him as a fallen hero, who betrayed the nation by grasping for personal power after independence. Since the 1949 publication of a historical novel, La Güera Rodríguez about Iturbide's aristocratic friend, Doña María Ignacia Rodríguez de Velasco, Iturbide was cast in the novel as her paramour, having an illicit affair with her. Although the portrayal of her was as a libertine, the notion was based on uncorroborated rumors and innuendo, with nothing ever proven, and then exaggerated in fiction. As her posthumous reputation as a "heroine of Mexican independence" has risen beginning in the late twentieth century, Iturbide's has continued to be something much less than that of Mexico's Liberator. A two-volume work on Mexican independence contrasts Hidalgo and Iturbide, with the subtitle "the glory and the oblivion".

Iturbide's strategy of defining a plan and using the military to back it began a tradition in Mexican politics that would dominate the country' history. He can be considered Mexico's first "caudillo", or charismatic military leader, using a combination of widespread popularity and threat of violence toward opposition to rule and would be followed by army generals Antonio López de Santa Anna and Porfirio Díaz, who came to dominate their respective eras. During the 1910 centenary celebrations of independence, the remains of Iturbide were not placed at the "El Ángel" with other leaders of independence, but stayed in the National Cathedral. Following the Mexican Revolution 1910–20, victorious revolutionary general and newly elected president of Mexico Álvaro Obregón mounted a massive centenary celebration for Mexican independence, even larger than the one that Porfirio Díaz had staged in 1910 to commemorate Hidalgo's revolt, considered the outbreak of the War of Independence. It was the first time since the mid-19th century that the date was commemorated. Given that Obregón himself was a military strong man, his 1921 commemoration of Mexican independence and Iturbide was an opportunity for him to assert his own state-building vision by appropriating a piece of Mexico's history. By overseeing the ceremonies, Obregón could shape and consolidate his own position in power, which was then relatively weak. The Mexican Army benefited from the celebrations with new uniforms and equipment, and there was even a re-enactment of Iturbide's triumphal entry into Mexico City.

Mexico's flag is also attributed to Iturbide – its three colors of red, white, and green originally represented the three guarantees of the Plan of Iguala: Freedom, Religion, and Union. In the place of the Spanish emblem for Mexico, Iturbide resurrected the old Tenochtitlán symbol for Mexico City, an eagle perched on a nopal cactus holding a snake in its beak. With it, he hoped to link the Mexican Empire with the Aztec one. Iturbide is noted in one stanza of the Himno Nacional Mexicano: "If to battle against the foreign host, the warrior trumpet invokes us, Mexicans, the Sacred Flag of Iturbide bravely follow. Let the conquered banners serve as a carpet to the brave steeds, may the laurels of triumph bring shade to the brow of the brave Captain."

== Honours ==
- Knight Grand Cross of the National Order of Our Lady of Guadalupe

== Gallery ==
Coat of Arms of Agustín de Iturbide as Emperor of Mexico

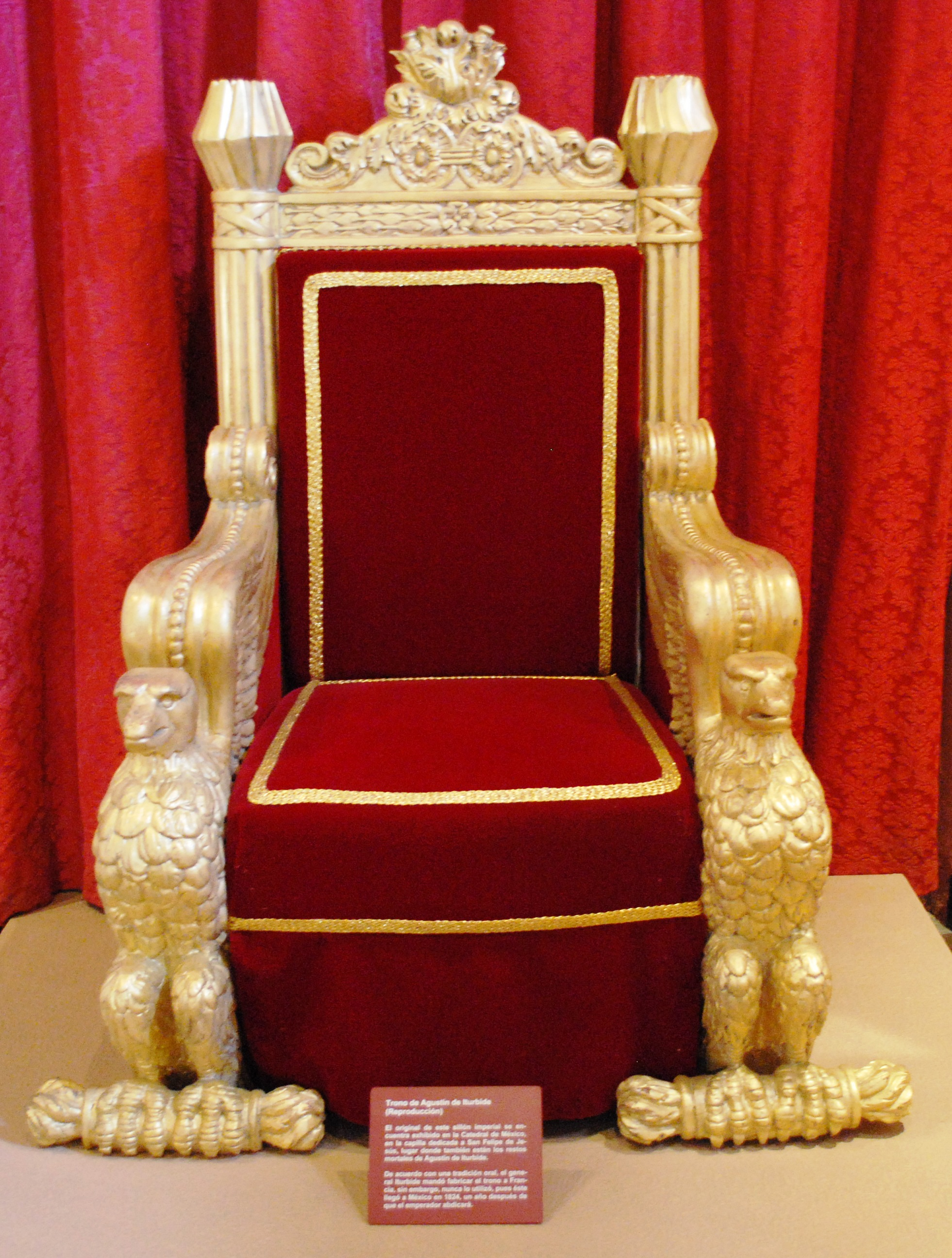
Throne of Agustín de Iturbide in the Museo Nacional de las Intervenciones

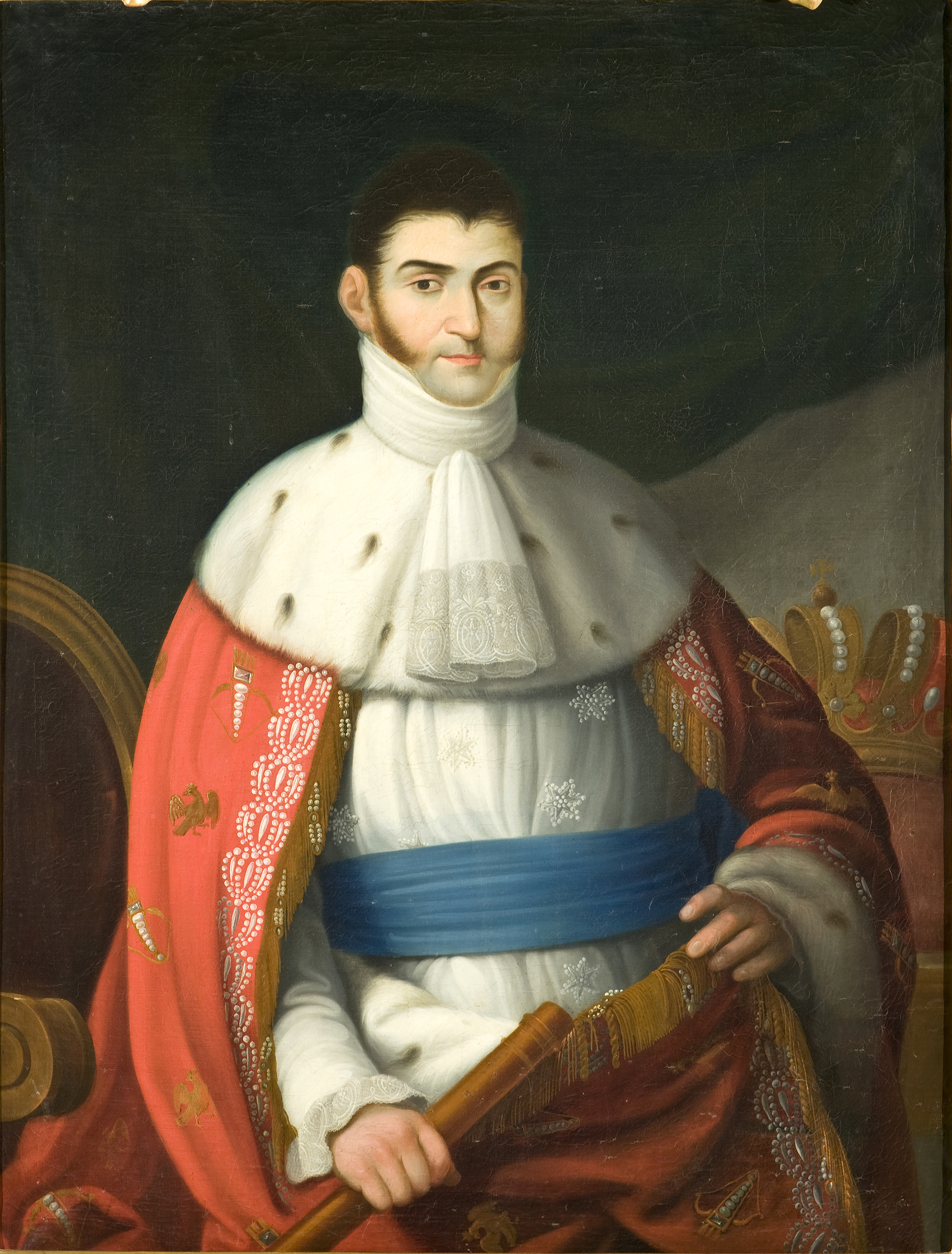
Iturbide in a 19th-century painting

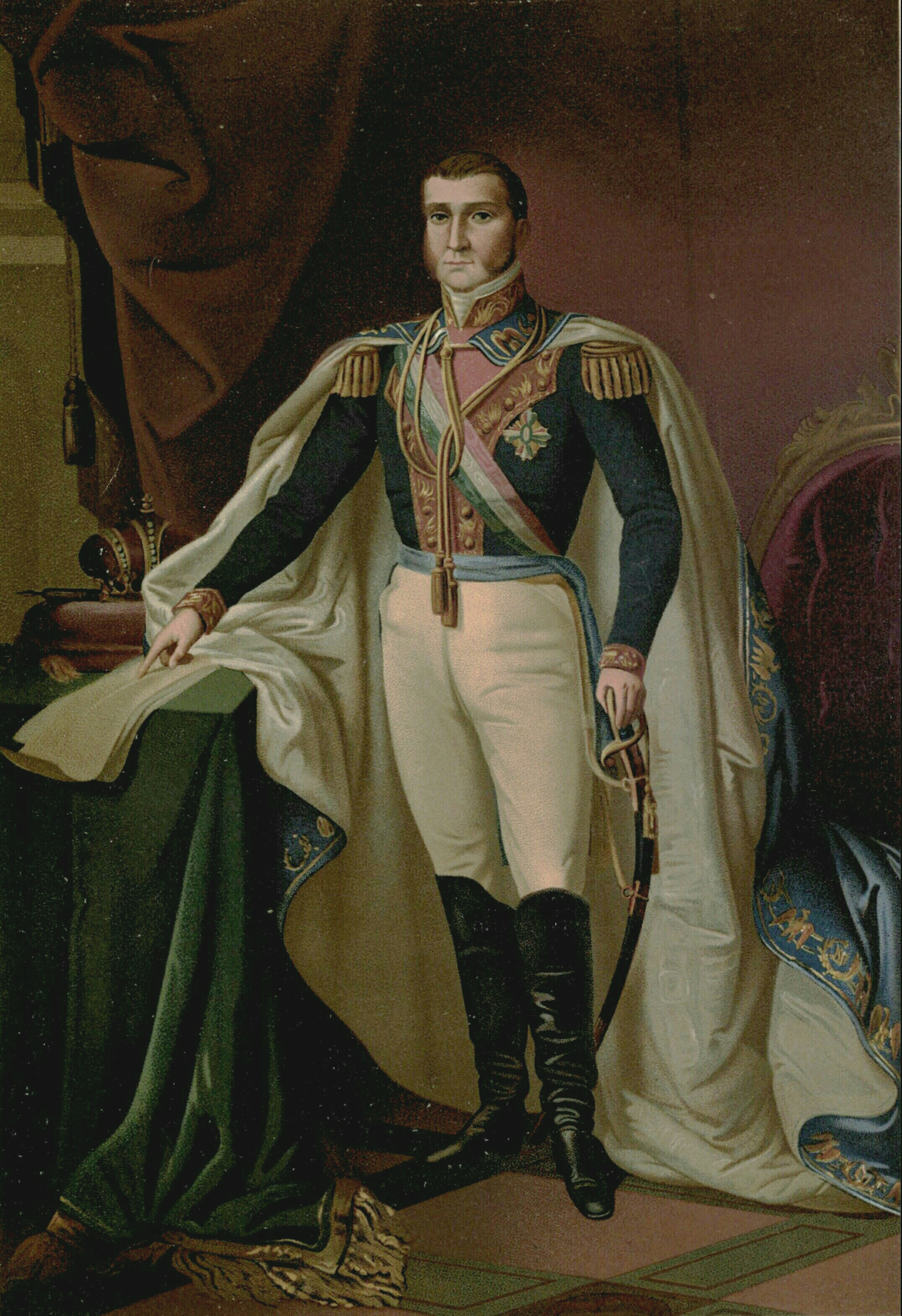
Copy of a portrait of Agustín I, Constitutional Emperor of Mexico, made for the Iturbide Gallery (current Ambassador's Hall) at the National Palace.

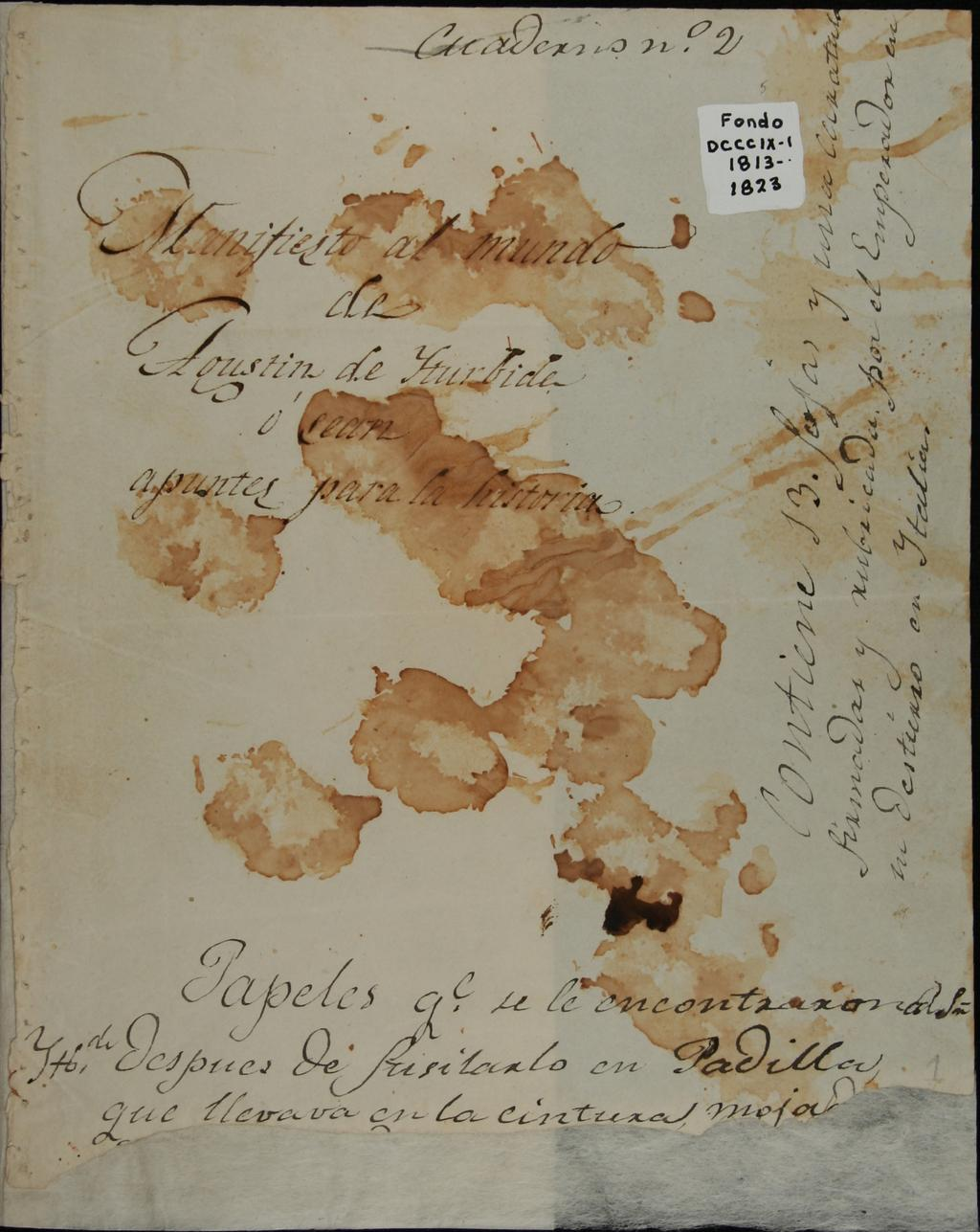
Declaration to the World (Manifiesto de Liorna) by Agustín de Iturbide or rather Notes for History, a manuscript tinged with his blood and found between his sash and shirt after his execution.

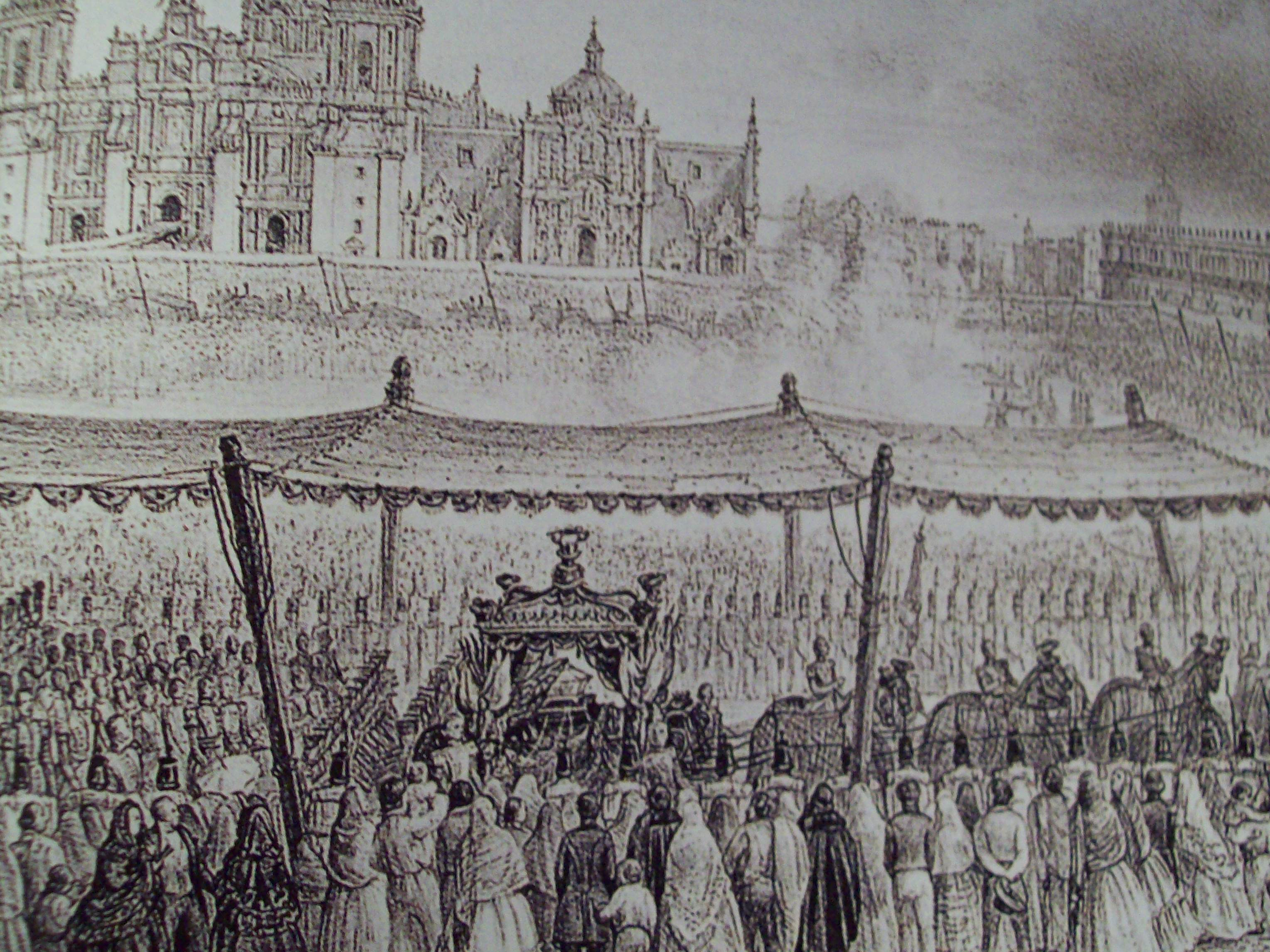
Transfer of the remains of Iturbide to the Metropolitan Cathedral of Mexico City. Lithography from Ignacio complement of 1849, published in the book "Description of the funeral solemnity funeral with which the remains of the hero of Iguala were honored."

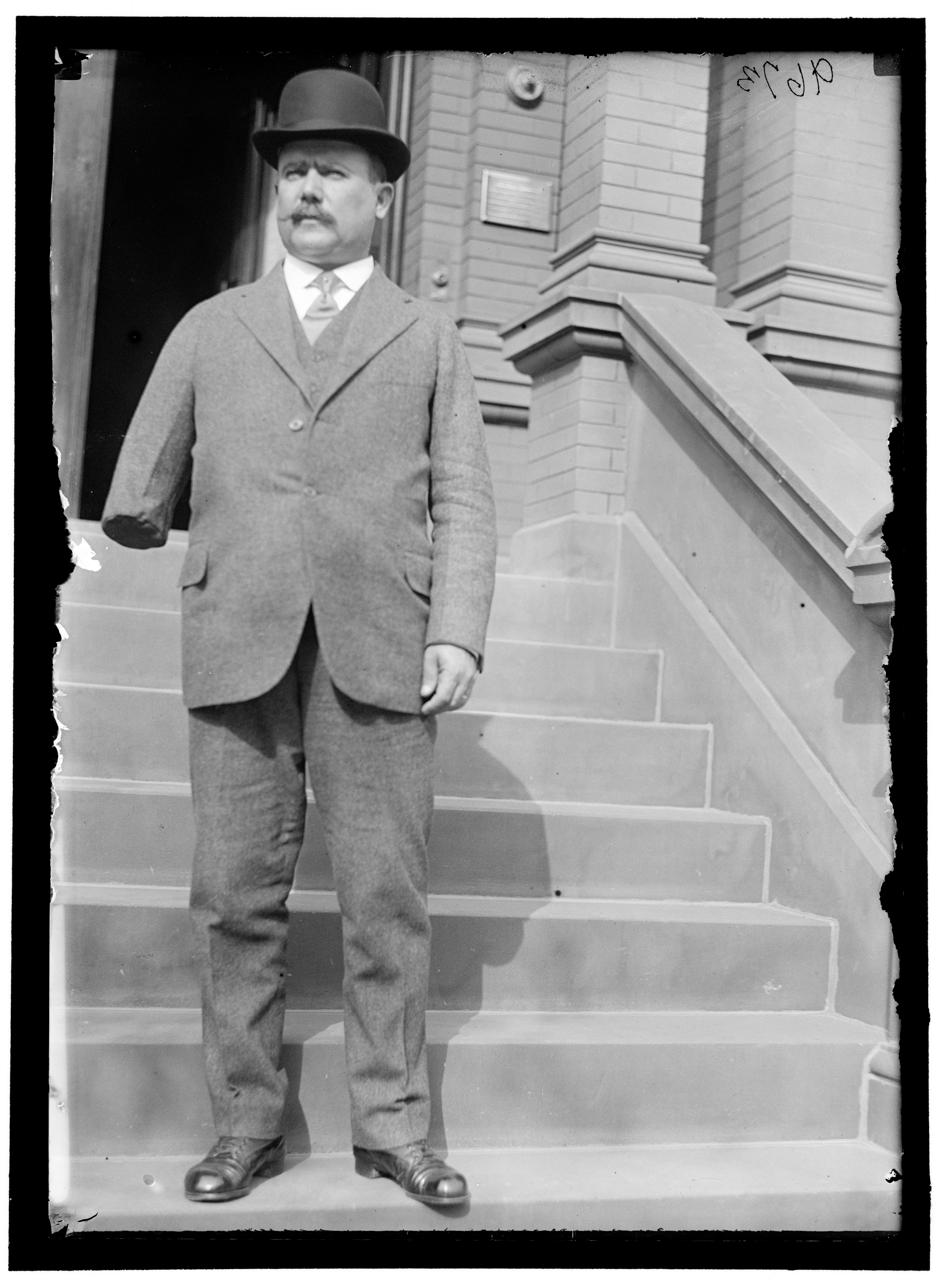
President Álvaro Obregón, who staged elaborate centennial commemorations of Iturbide in 1921.

== See also ==
- Declaration to the world
- History of democracy in Mexico
- List of heads of state of Mexico
- Embrace of Acatempan
- Army of the Three Guarantees
- Palace of Iturbide

Regnal titles
New title Independence from Spain; Empire declared	Emperor of Mexico; 19 May 1822 –19 March 1823	Monarchy abolished Republic declared
New title Independence from Spain; Empire declared	Emperor of Mexico; 19 May 1822 –19 March 1823	Vacant Title next held by Maximiliano I
Political offices
Vacant Title last held by Juan O'Donojú	Mexican head of state as Emperor of Mexico; 19 May 1822 – 19 March 1823	Vacant Title next held by Guadalupe Victoria
Titles in pretence
New title	— TITULAR — Emperor of Mexico; 19 March 1823 – 19 July 1824	Succeeded by Agustín II
