= Embrace of Acatempan =

Event in Mexican history

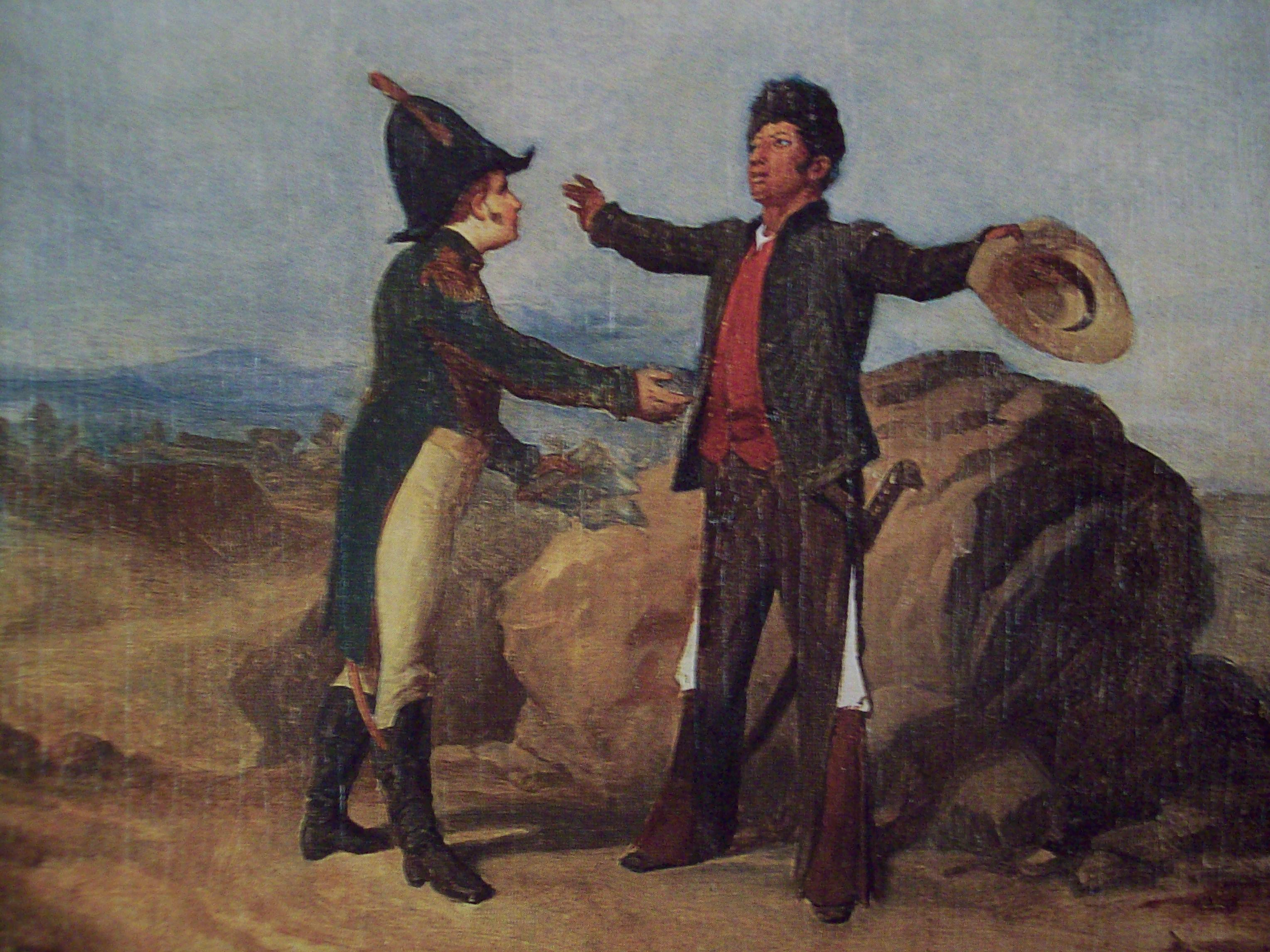
- 1870 painting of the event by Román Sagredo
- Native name: Abrazo de Acatempan
- Date: February 10, 1821
- Location: Teloloapan, Guerrero
- Type: Reconciliation

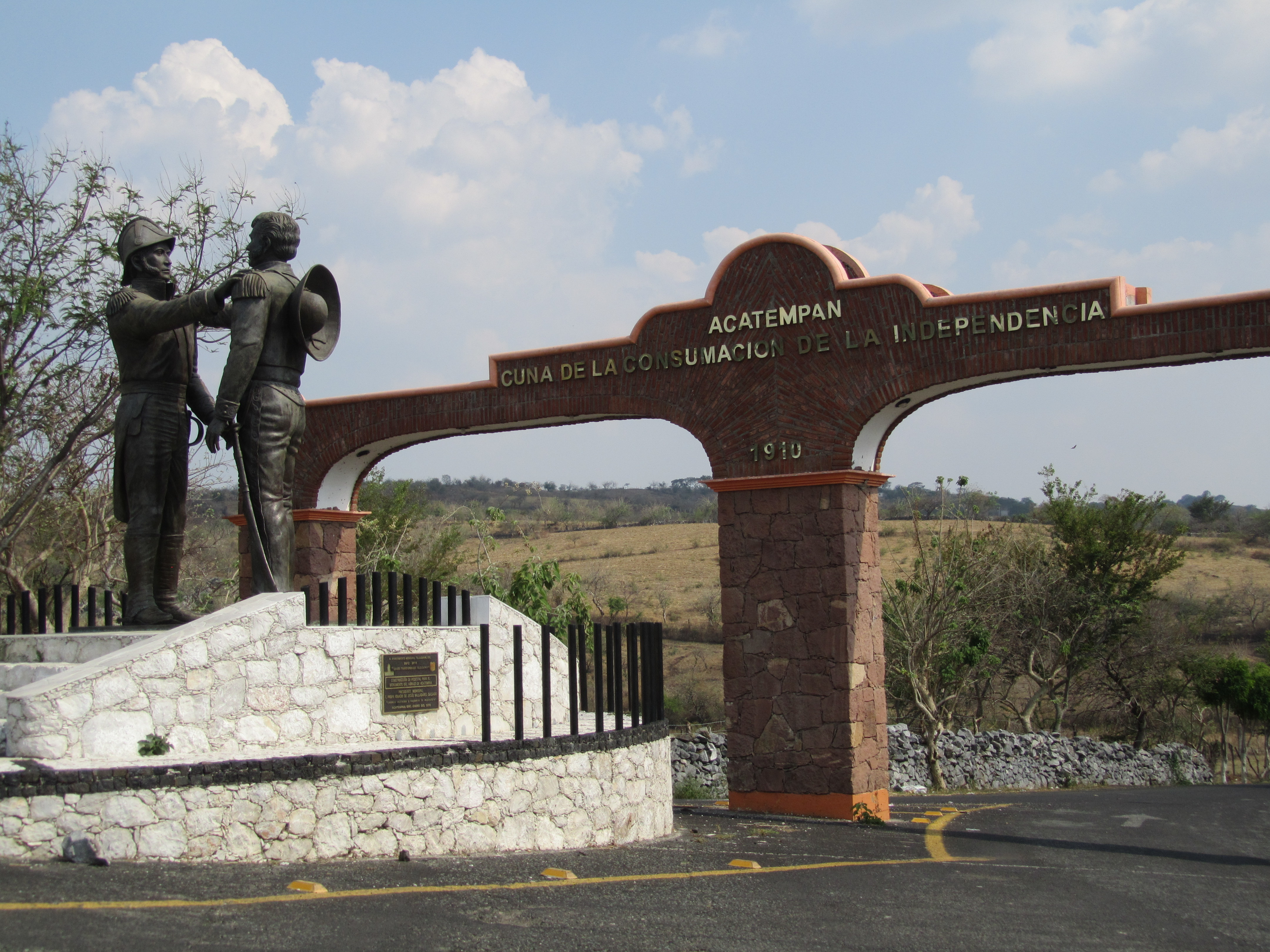
Statue created in honor in Guerrero

The Embrace of Acatempan (Spanish: Abrazo de Acatempan) refers to an event in Mexican history in which Agustín de Iturbide, commander-in-chief of the military of southern New Spain, and Vicente Guerrero, leader of the forces fighting for Mexican Independence, participated. This event took place on February 10, 1821. Tradition has it that this event marked the reconciliation between the viceregal forces and the insurgent army.

== Background ==
In 1816, the captain general of Cuba, Juan José Ruiz de Apodaca was appointed viceroy of New Spain. He immediately amplified a policy that had already been applied by his predecessors, viceroys Venegas and Calleja, the granting of pardons for insurgent leaders who laid down their arms. Some of the most important ones, such as Nicolás Bravo, Manuel de Mier y Terán and Ignacio López Rayón accepted this measure. Others refused to accept it, such as Pedro Moreno, Pedro Ascencio, Guerrero and Guadalupe Victoria. Thanks to this policy, the insurgency in New Spain was notably reduced. Both the viceroy and other authorities considered that, in three years, 9,998 rebels were killed, 6,000 taken prisoner and 35,000 pardoned. Although the figures are, at least, questionable, it is true that historiography has considered the government of Ruiz de Apocada, in general terms, as a period of increasing pacification of New Spain and, proportionally, as a stage of insurgent decline.

On January 1, 1820, in Las Cabezas de San Juan (Andalusia, Spain), Colonel Rafael del Riego rose up in arms, proclaiming that King Ferdinand VII should swear the Constitution of Cadiz, which the Cortes Generales had proclaimed in 1812. On May 26, the intendant of the province of Veracruz, José Dávila proclaimed the Constitution of Cadiz. Apodaca did the same in the capital on May 31.

The constitutional reestablishment took the novo-Hispanics by surprise. Some people feared that the privileges of the clergy and the army would be suppressed.

When Guerrero learned of the situation, he tried to convince Colonel José Gabriel de Armijo, a royalist commander in the south, to join his movement. Armijo remained loyal to the Spanish government. Guerrero tried again to persuade him through a letter dated August 17, which was sent to Armijo with Colonel Carlos Moya.

On November 9, Armijo, commander of the operations in the south of the country, resigned. He claimed health reasons, although he also had differences with Viceroy Apodaca, who transferred him to Seville immediately.

Apodaca then appointed Agustín de Iturbide as the new commander of the army of operations in the south, on the recommendation of oidor Bataller. On November 16, 1820, Iturbide left Mexico City and established his headquarters in Teloloapan, in the current state of Guerrero.

== The Embrace ==
Iturbide tried, as Armijo had done before, to convince Guerrero to accept the pardon, but was rejected. After these attempts, he wrote a new note to Guerrero on January 10, asking him to withdraw from the struggle, that the government would respect his military position and grant him a pardon. Guerrero strictly refused. Days later, on January 25, Iturbide requested an interview with Guerrero. He presented him with his political program, which would later be embodied in the Plan of Iguala.

The first to point out the meeting was the deserter Tomás Cajigal, who (to ingratiate himself with the viceregal government), accused Iturbide of having placed himself under Guerrero's orders. According to his version, the meeting took place on March 14.

Historian Carlos María de Bustamante stated that Guerrero met with Iturbide, but does not indicate the date. He quotes a letter from Iturbide to the viceroy, dated February 18, 1821, in which the former said that:

Not having been able to inspire the necessary confidence in that caudillo to answer with me, we managed to get the individual who deserves all his trust, namely Don José Figueroa, to come.

This letter would prove that there was no meeting between the two leaders before February 18.

Years later, Lorenzo de Zavala published in his Ensayo histórico de las revoluciones de México (Historical Essay on the Revolutions of Mexico), that the meeting did take place. He imagined a dialogue between the caudillos, which is the one that tradition has preserved:

I cannot explain the satisfaction I experience when I meet a patriot who has upheld the noble cause of independence and has single-handedly survived so many disasters, keeping alive the sacred fire of freedom. Receive this just tribute to your courage and your virtues.

— Agustín de Iturbide, referring to Vicente Guerrero, during the Embrace of Acatempan.

I sir, say to you, I congratulate my country for recovering on this day a son whose courage and knowledge have been so dismal.

— Vicente Guerrero, referring to Agustín de Iturbide, during the Embrace of Acatempan.

Lucas Alamán rejected Zavala's version, as he recovered Iturbide's report and, with other sources, supported that the insurgent who met in Teloloapan with Iturbide was José Figueroa, who was empowered by Guerrero to arrange all the conditions.

Of course, in Acatempan, Guerrero, the tradition of the embrace is very important and reflects a sense of local identity.

== Consequences ==
Flag of the Army of the Three Guarantees.

On February 24, Iturbide proclaimed the Plan of Iguala. He relied on the troops of Guerrero, Asencio and other caudillos. He got several former insurgents who had been pardoned to take up arms again to support him.

Finally, on September 27, the Army of the Three Guarantees, with Iturbide at its head, made its triumphal entry into Mexico City.

== See also ==
- Plan of Iguala
- Army of the Three Guarantees

== Bibliography ==
- Fuentes Mares, José (1984). Historia Ilustrada de México (in Spanish). Mexico City: Editorial Océano. ISBN 968-491-045-2.
- Moreno Gutiérrez, Rodrigo (2017). La trigarancia. Fuerzas armadas en la consumación de la independencia. Nueva España, 1820-1821 (in Spanish). Mexico: UNAM. ISBN 978-607-02-8679-7.
- Nieto López, José de Jesús (1998). Historia 3 (in Spanish). Mexico City: Editorial Castillo. ISBN 970-642-214-5.
- Rosas, Alejandro (2001). Los presidentes de México (in Spanish). Mexico City: Planeta. ISBN 970-690-507-3.
- Velázquez, Rogelio (2000). Historia de México (in Spanish). Editorial Castillo. ISBN 970-20-0019-X.
- Zárate, Julio (1889). Riva Palacio, Vicente (ed.). México a través de los siglos (in Spanish). Mexico City: Editorial Cumbre.
