= Declaration to the world =

Document written by Agustín de Iturbide

Declaration to the world or notes for the history
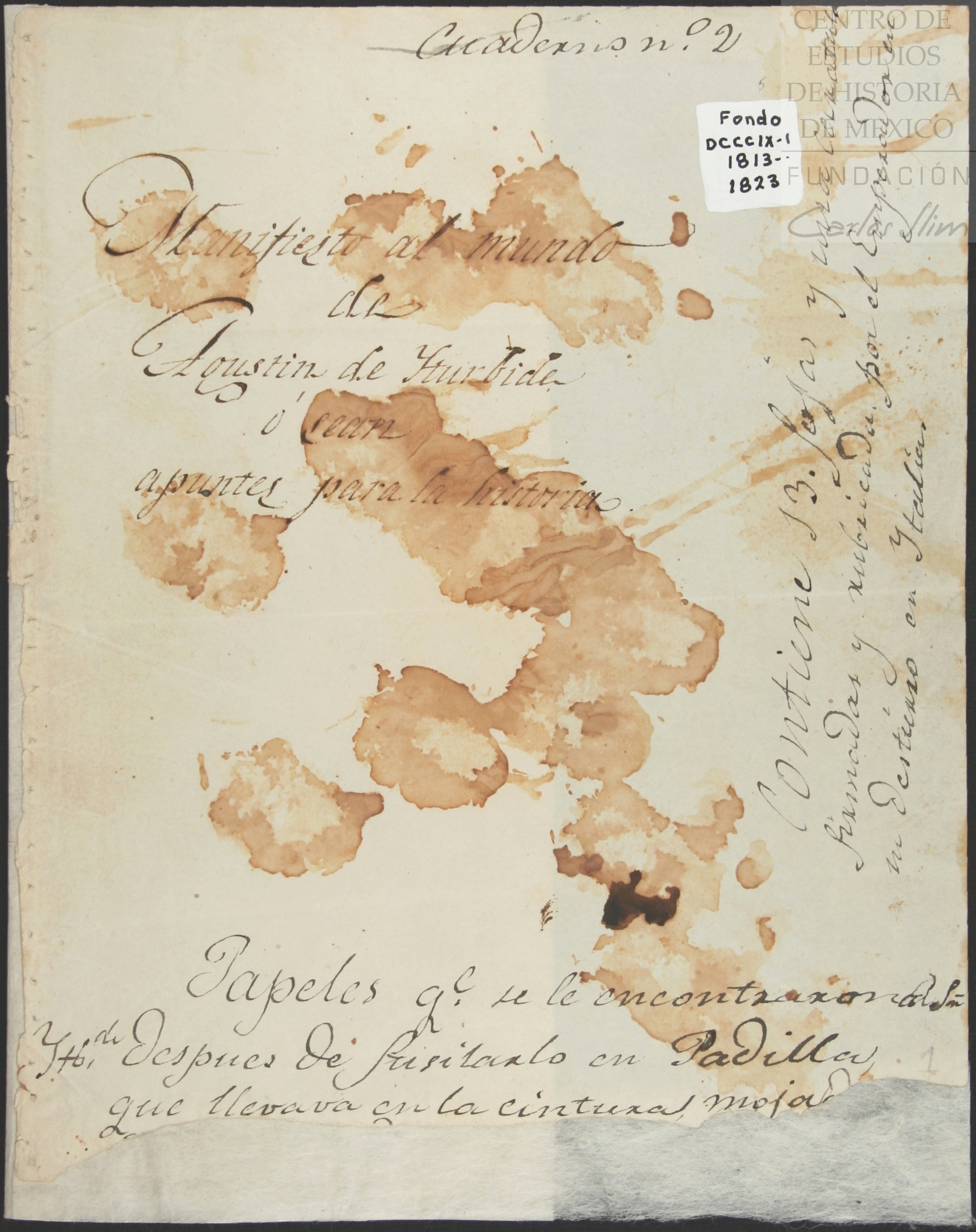
- The document, bearing stains of Iturbide's blood.
- Created: 1823
- Location: CARSO Center for the Study of Mexican History, Mexico City
- Author(s): Agustín de Iturbide

Declaration to the world, or notes for history (Manifiesto al mundo o sean apuntes para la historia or Manifiesto desde Liorna) is a document written by Agustín de Iturbide (1793-1824) after he had been deposed in March 1823 as emperor of Mexico, and made public on October 13, 1824 after his death. This document reflected his views of himself and of his duties in the politics of his country. It was found by chance between his shirt and girdle after his execution for treason on July 19, 1824 in Nuevo Santander, now in Tamaulipas state. The stains on the document are the blood of Iturbide.

He said:

In Philadelphia, in Havana and in some European newspapers they have spoken of me, painting me in the darkest colors and with exaggerated features: cruel, ambitious and a mercenary. (En Filadelfia, en la Habana y en algunos periódicos de Europa se ha hablado de mi pintándome con los más negros colores; cruel, ambicioso, interesado con los rasgos más marcados.)

About his vision:

Only a visionary can see how many arguments can be levelled against the dream of a Mexican republic, and how little influence the campaigners for the so-called New Spain had with the United States of America. (Sólo cabe en la cabeza de un visionario, cuantas razones se podrían exponer contra la soñada república de los mejicanos, y que poco alcanzan los que camparan a lo que se llamó la Nueva España, con los Estados Unidos de América.)

== Context ==
Five days before his shooting, the former emperor arrived at the port of Soto la Marina, Tamaulipas coming from Europe after an exile of more than a year. He ignored the publication of a decree calling for his immediate execution if he stepped on Mexican soil. He planned to offer his services to the Mexican authorities to face a possible Spanish invasion. One year after restoration of absolute monarchy in Spain, king Fernando VII had plans to reconquer Mexico using forces under the command of Félix Calleja.

Iturbide, his pregnant wife Ana María Huarte and his two younger children, a nephew and the Polish lieutenant Beneski arrived on board the English ship Spring on July 14, 1824. Felipe de la Garza, regional commander, arrested Iturbide and informed him that, in accordance with a decree of Congress, he would be immediately executed by firing squad. Iturbide asked to be moved to Padilla, in order to negotiate with the legislators of the Congress of Tamaulipas. However, they refused to listen him and imprisoned him.

While he awaited his shooting, Iturbide drafted some letters. He wrote a farewell to his wife and children, and to the legislators seeking to know what he was accused of. On July 19 at 15:00 the sentence of death, approved by the majority, was read out. Iturbide was conveyed to the main square of Padilla. Before execution he spoke to the people gathered in the main square and called on them to remain united as Mexicans, love their country, follow the Catholic precepts and obey the directions of the authorities. He strongly denied that he was a traitor.

Iturbide was buried in the local church by the people of Padilla. In 1838, president Anastasio Bustamante ordered his remains to be moved to the altar of San Felipe de Jesús in the Metropolitan Cathedral of the City of Mexico.
