= Mexican nobility =

Hereditary nobility

The Mexican nobility were a hereditary nobility of Mexico, with specific privileges and obligations determined in the various political systems that historically ruled over the territory of Mexico.

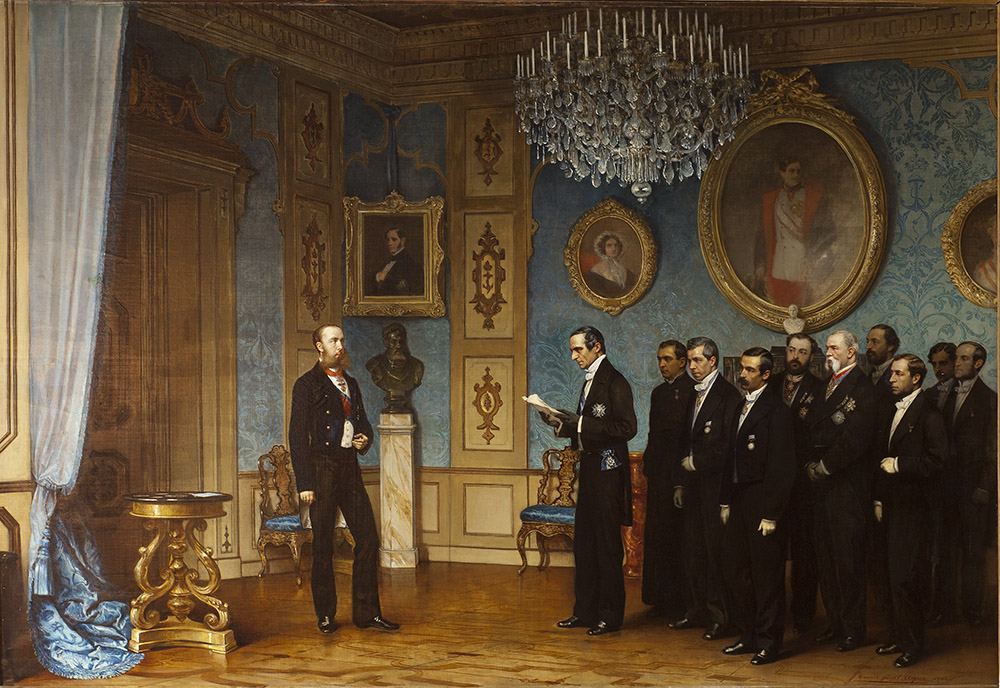
A deputation of many members of the Mexican nobility, presenting the throne of the Mexican Empire to the future Maximilian I of Mexico in 1863. He was a descendant of prior Habsburg rulers of New Spain (Mexico).

The term is used in reference to various groups throughout the entirety of Mexican history, from formerly ruling indigenous families of the pre-Columbian states of present-day Mexico, to noble Mexican families of Spanish (as well as Mestizo) and other European descent, which include conquistadors and their descendants (ennobled by King Philip II in 1573), untitled noble families of Mexico, and holders of titles of nobility acquired during the Viceroyalty of the New Spain (1521–1821), the First Mexican Empire (1821–1823), and the Second Mexican Empire (1862–1867); as well as bearers of titles and other noble prerogatives granted by foreign powers who have settled in Mexico.

The Political Constitution of Mexico has prohibited the State from recognizing any titles of nobility since 1917. The present United Mexican States does not issue or recognize titles of nobility or any hereditary prerogatives and honors. Informally, however, a Mexican aristocracy remains a part of Mexican culture and its hierarchical society.

== Indigenous Mexican nobility ==
=== Pre-Columbian nobility ===
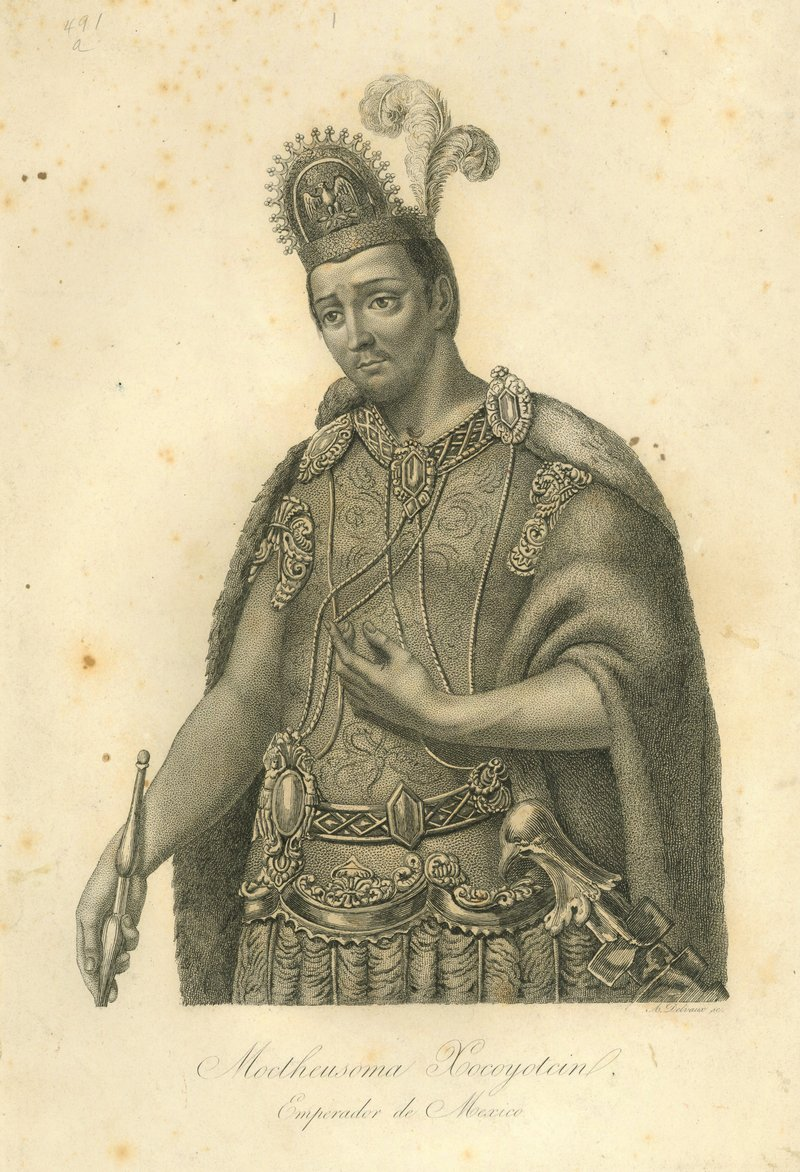
Depiction of Weyi Tlahtoani, or Emperor Moctezuma II of the Mexica

The Mexica, Maya, Olmec, Zapotec, Mixtec, Purépecha, Tlaxcaltec, and many other Indigenous peoples of present-day Mexico developed strong hierarchical societies based on hereditary privileges and obligations which were passed down to individuals in regards to the historical roles played by their ancestors in politics, war and religion. Society was firmly divided between the ruling elites and the governed masses, often making use of specific royal titles like Tlatoani, Tlatoque or Cazonci, in reference to rulers and members of ruling families. The organization of members of noble families in military orders (as the eagle and jaguar warriors), as well as in political functions (as calpixques), derived in the establishment of a hereditary aristocracy with similar characteristics to those found in other parts of the World, often using titles like that of Pipiltin or Pilli in reference to individuals of noble lineage.

=== Indigenous nobles under Spanish rule ===
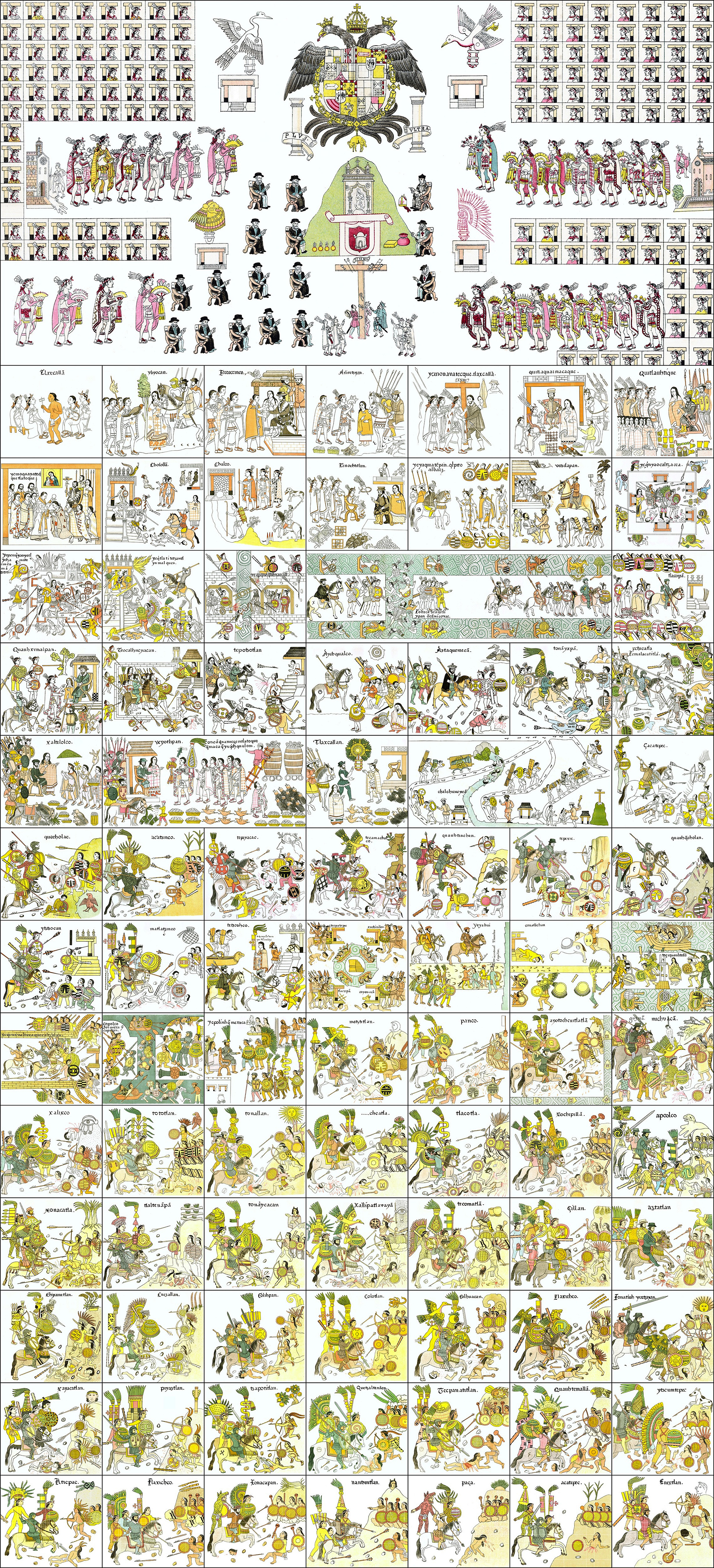
The "Lienzo de Tlaxcala" was commissioned by Tlaxcaltec rulers to demand the recognition of their privileges by the new regime.

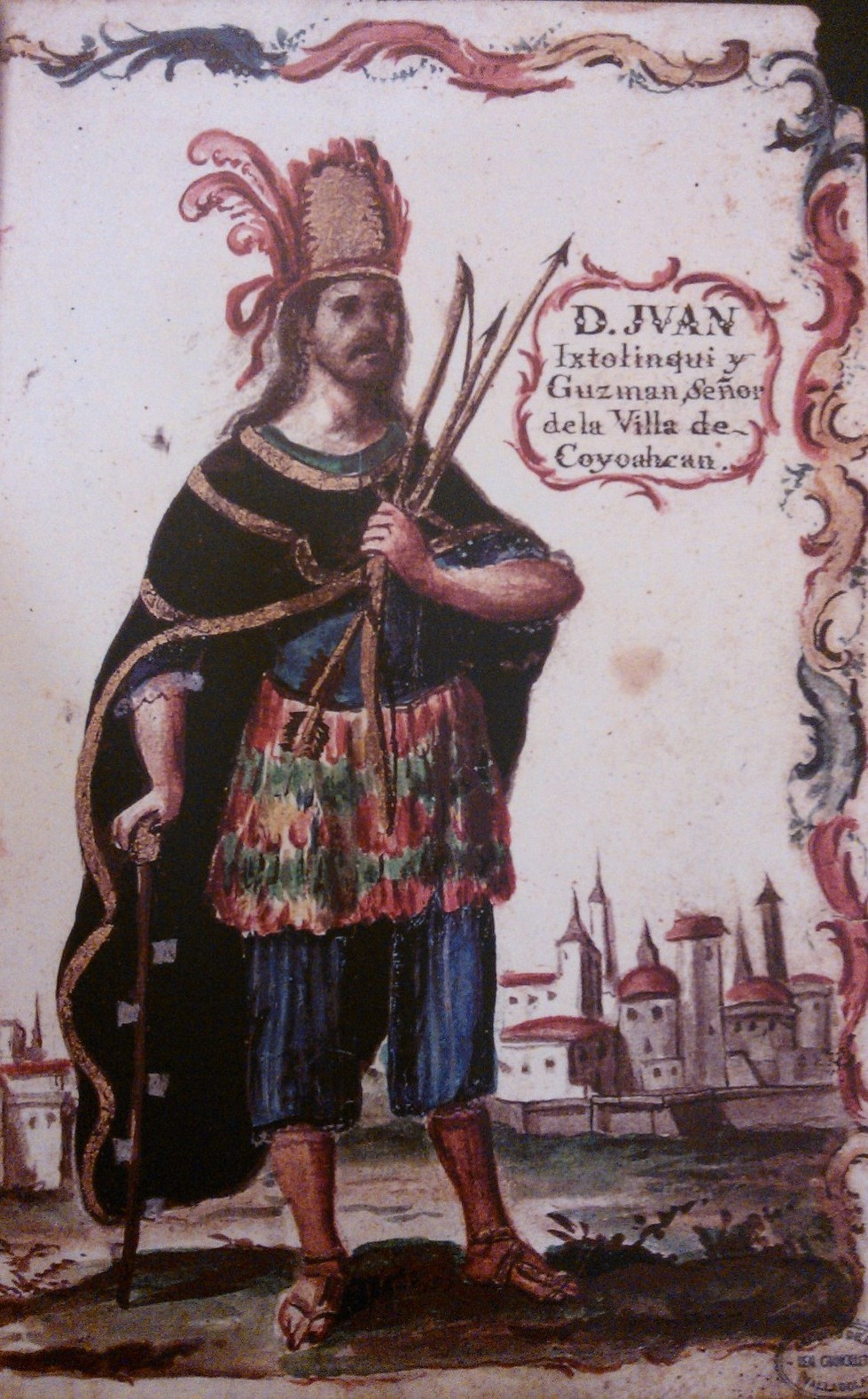
Portrait of Don Juan Ixtolinque, Lord of Coyoacán under Spanish rule.

When the Spanish first arrived in present-day Mexico (1518), indigenous rulers and nobles headed the defense of their territories against the invaders, soon after signing peace treaties and alliances to ensure the survival of their people. In this process, many indigenous peoples ended up participating in the military conquests of the Spanish Empire, gaining recognition of their ancient privileges as well as earning new ones due to their merits in the conquest of the Americas. In accordance to Spanish tradition under the Habsburg dynasty, the Crown of Castile recognized the pre-existing social organization of the native peoples and assimilated their ancient elites to the new regime, often offering them the same conditions as nobles of Spanish extraction. In this way, the Spaniards respected the native systems and added to them, sometimes resulting in many unions between Aztec and Spanish nobility. One example is the marriage between Agustin Moctezuma, cacique of Chilapa and a direct descendant from Moctezuma II. and several other Mexica kings, with María Antonia Guerrero Dávila, the heiress of the Mayorazgo of Guerrero, and aunt of the Marquesa de Villar del Águila. To this day, Mexican aristocrats take pride not only in their noble Spanish ancestors but also in being descendants of the ancient kings of their country.

During Spanish rule, indigenous nobles were referred to as caciques (term imported from the Antilles), maintaining political relevance as rulers of the repúblicas de indios (self-governed indigenous states), as well as receiving access to educational institutions (such as the Jesuit colleges and the Royal and Pontifical University of Mexico), as well as accessing Spanish institutions of organized nobility (like the Spanish military orders). At the time, religious convents were intended for specific social and ethnic groups, being the convents of indias cacicas some of the most privileged (such as the Corpus Christi convent in Mexico City). Nevertheless, the succession laws of Spanish tradition slowly permeated the Amerindian traditions, altering access to this elite class to patrilineal descendants of ancient rulers, in opposition to the mixed-lineal descent of their ancient traditions.

While numerous indigenous families and individuals were recognized as nobles by the Crown of Castile, certain populations who were specially active in the conquest and colonization of what was later known as the New Spain were also distinguished with collective nobility, this included the Tlaxcalan and Quauhquecholan peoples, who collectively gained the condition of hidalgos, a privilege that had only been received by the Basque people of the Iberian Peninsula. Many of these nobles resettled into western and northern Mexico to help pacify tribes there.

Some Amerindian nobles, like the Mixtec Villagómez family, were among the richest landowners in New Spain, retaining their Mixtec identity, speaking the Mixtec language and even keeping a collection of valuable Mixtecan documents. Nevertheless, most indigenous nobles lost their privileges at the fall of the Spanish Empire, losing all recognition, as with all Mexican nobles, with the birth of the modern Mexican Republic.

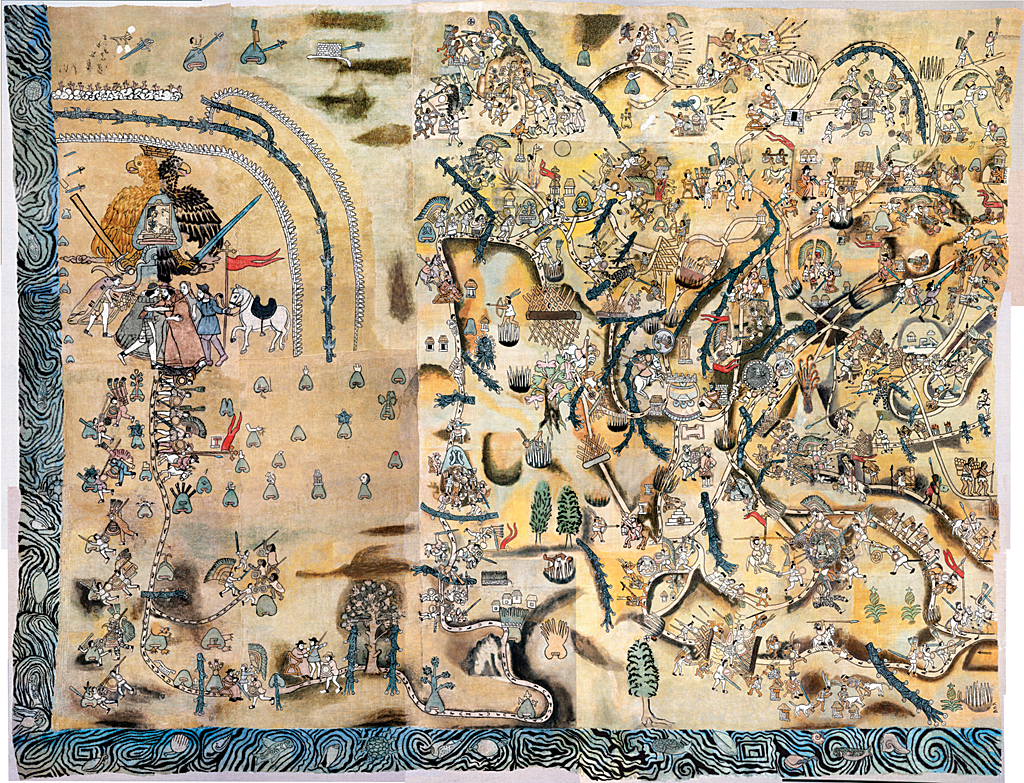
The "Lienzo de Quauhquechollan" depicts the conquest of Guatemala by the alliance between the Quauhquechollan rulers and the forces of Don Jorge de Alvarado.

=== The Imperial House of Moctezuma ===
The coat of arms of the Dukes of Moctezuma de Tultengo (Grandees of Spain), Viscounts of Iluacán, and Marquesses of Tenebrón. It is made of the combined arms authorized by the Kings of Spain to certain lines of descent of Moctezeuma II on different dates.

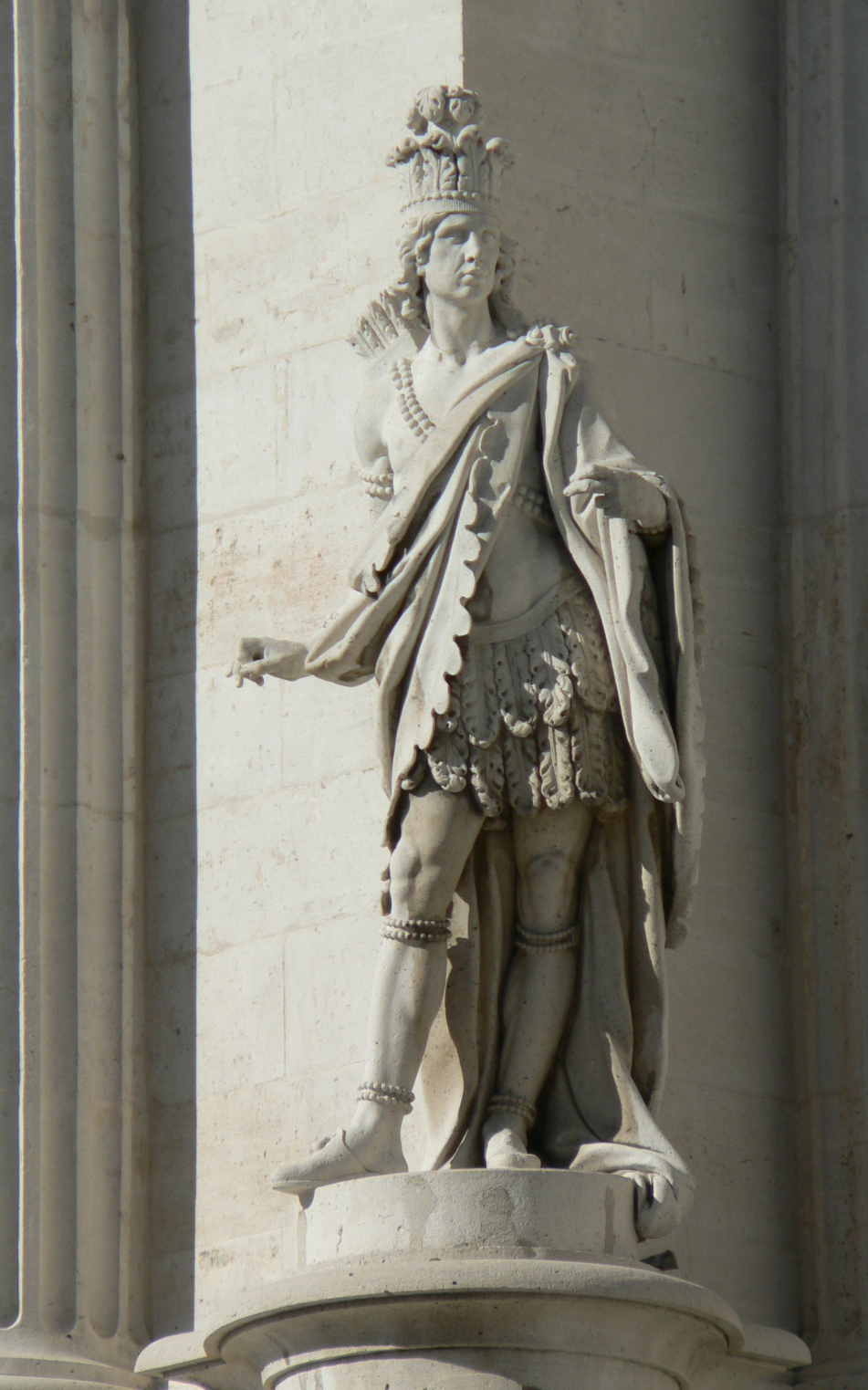
Statue of Emperor Moctezuma II, carved into the Royal Palace of Madrid in Spain.

Amongst the descendants of the pre-Columbian rulers of present-day Mexico who received special distinctions under Spanish rule, none were more privileged than the descendants of Emperor Moctezuma II of the Mexica. The Emperor's son, Don Pedro de Moctezuma Tlacahuepan, formed a mayorazgo and settled in Seville, where his eldest grandson received the titles of Count of Moctezuma (later elevated to Duke of Moctezuma, Grandee of Spain, becoming part of the Spanish nobility), Viscount of Ilucán, Lord of Monterrojano, as well as the investiture as Knight of the Order of Santiago. In 1696, the husband of the 3rd Countess of Moctezuma was named Viceroy of the New Spain, being created Duke of Atrisco (or Atlixco) in 1704. Other historical members of the family include Doña Isabel de Moctezuma, Doña Francisca de Moctezuma, Princess of Ecatepec, Don Manuel Holgado-Moctezuma, 1st Marquess of Moctezuma, Doña María Isabel de Moctezuma, 1st Marchioness of La Liseda, Don Vicente de Moctezuma, 9th Marquess of Cerralbo, Don Pedro Tesifón de Moctezuma (knight of the Order of Santiago), Don Joaquín Gines de Oca Moctezuma y Mendoza (who received the Grandeza de España from Charles III of Spain), amongst others. It is noteworthy that the House of Moctezuma came to be counted with the great noble houses of Spain, establishing family relationships with them; as an example, from Doña María Isabel Francisca de Zaldívar y Castilla, a descendant of the Tlatoani as well as Pedro I of Castile. Only they and the Inca royal house (with the Borja-Loyola Inca) would come to have these strong levels of prestige in the high nobility of the Spanish Empire. The modern-day Kingdom of Spain still legally recognizes all of these titles, despite the Mexican Republic opposing all recognition. In addition to the titles and other privileges the King Charles I of Spain (also Emperor Charles V of the Holy Roman Empire) offered the descendants of Emperor Moctezuma II a compensation of five-hundred ducats to be paid every year in perpetuity for the use by the capital city of water sources and lumber in their private estate in Mexico City. This payment was only interrupted in 1938 during the presidency of Abelardo L. Rodríguez, being contested until this day by the Countess of Miravalle and other notable descendants. The present Ambassador of Mexico to the United States of America, Esteban Moctezuma, is descended from this family.

== Nobility of the Viceroyalty of New Spain ==
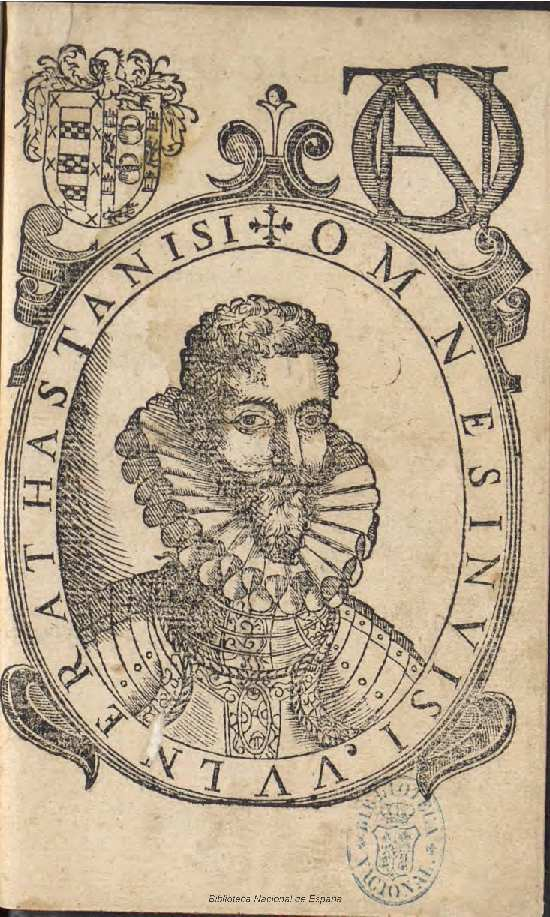
Don Antonio de Saavedra Guzmán, the first American-born poet ever to be published, was an untitled Mexican noble.

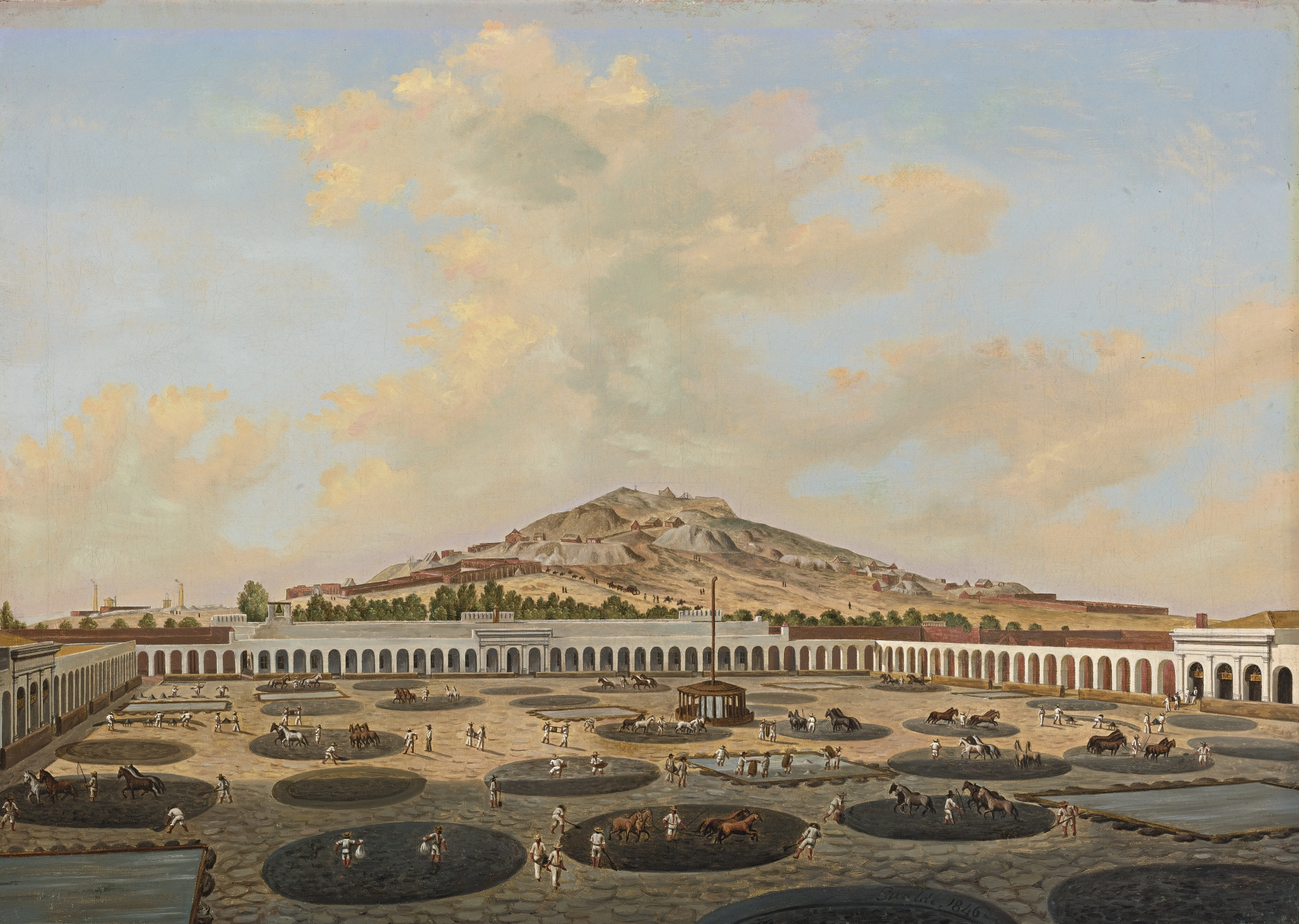
The Hacienda of Proaño in Zacatecas applying the Patio process of silver extraction invented by Bartolomé de Medina, which made the mine owners of New Spain some of the wealthiest people of the 17th and 18th century.

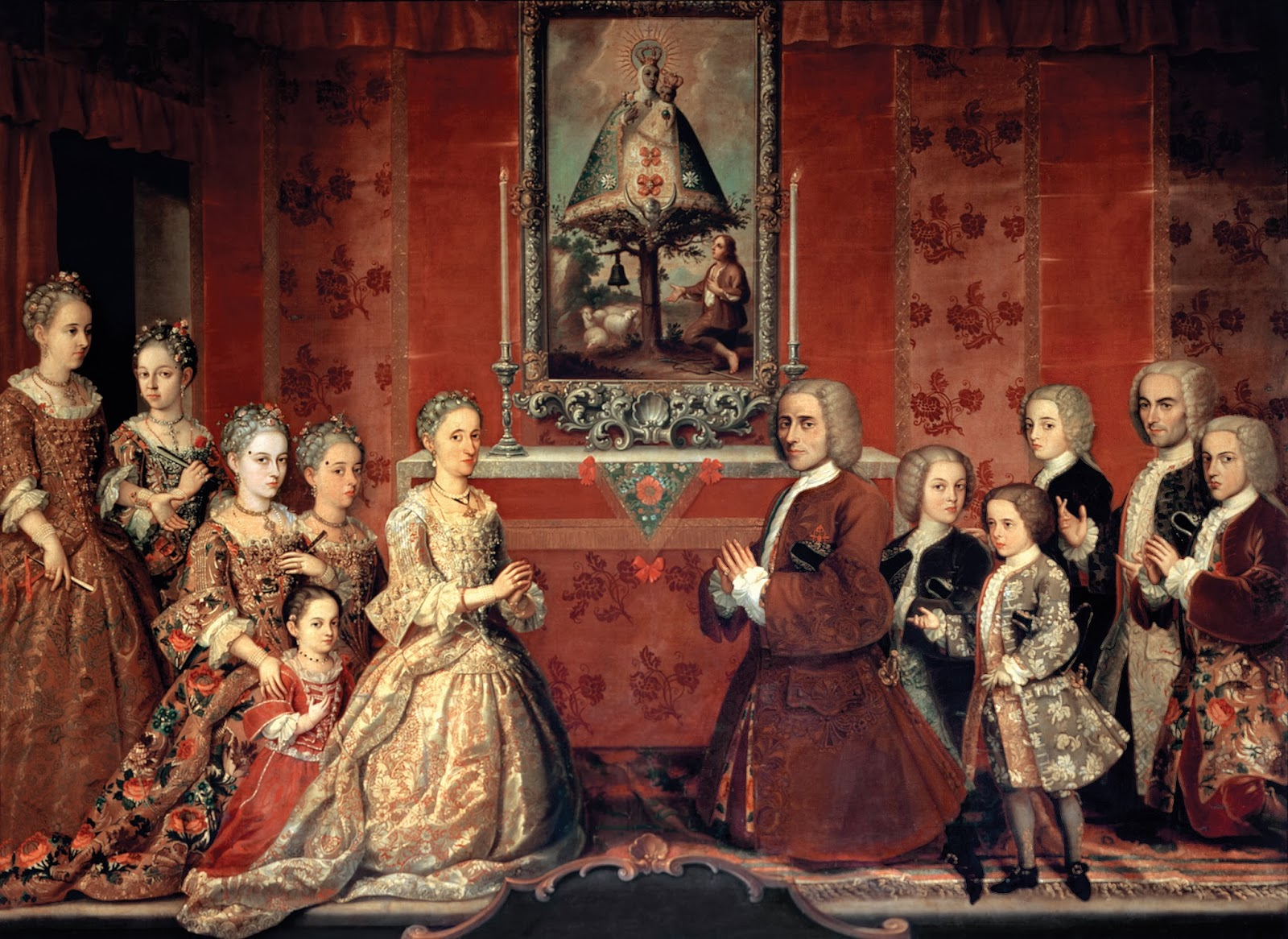
Portrait of the Fagoaga family whose eldest son became the 1st Marqués del Apartado, c. 1735.

=== Nobleza de Indias or "Nobility of the Indies" ===
The Spanish conquest of present-day Mexico brought with it the implementation of its political, religious, economical and social system, which included the legal division of society between nobles and plebeians ("sociedad estamental", see Estates of the realm), a system which subsisted during the entirety of Spanish rule (in present-day Spain the distinction was only abolished at the second half of the 19th century). In addition to the pre-existing families belonging to ancient indigenous nobility, new ones were added, including European families whose nobility was pre-existing prior to their arrival to the Americas, and others whose nobility was gained through the available resources of the day, including participation in the conquest, founding and settling of the Indies and thus became the elite Hidalgos de Indias (as determined in the Ordenanzas de Segovia, promulgated by King Philip II in 1573). In this process, the conquistadors, founders, first settlers, and all their male but also female descendants, received recognition of the same noble condition as their European and indigenous counterparts ("hijosdalgo y personas nobles de linaje y solar conoçido"), forming a diverse and multicultural elite that has been known to historians as "Nobleza de Indias", or "Nobility of the Indies". Nobles from both ethnic extractions shared territorial, political and military power, and participated together in religious and public ceremonies, nevertheless, marriages between both groups where rare after the 16th century, with both units responding to different interests and unique set of traditions. In most cases, the "noble class" was formed by provincial hidalgos of Spanish extraction who held local political and military power, and whose fortunes varied greatly from one territory to another, depending on the local resources and opportunities for production and commerce.

The hacienda was the archetypical symbol of the power of the "Nobleza de Indias", although some even more privileged nobles also held ownership of urban palaces as well as extensive cattle-ranches and mines (at the 18th century, silver mines in the New Spain had surpassed the Peruvians as the most productive in the World). The intricacies of this society were described by Prussian scientist and explorer Alexander von Humboldt in his "Political Essay of the Kingdom of the New Spain".

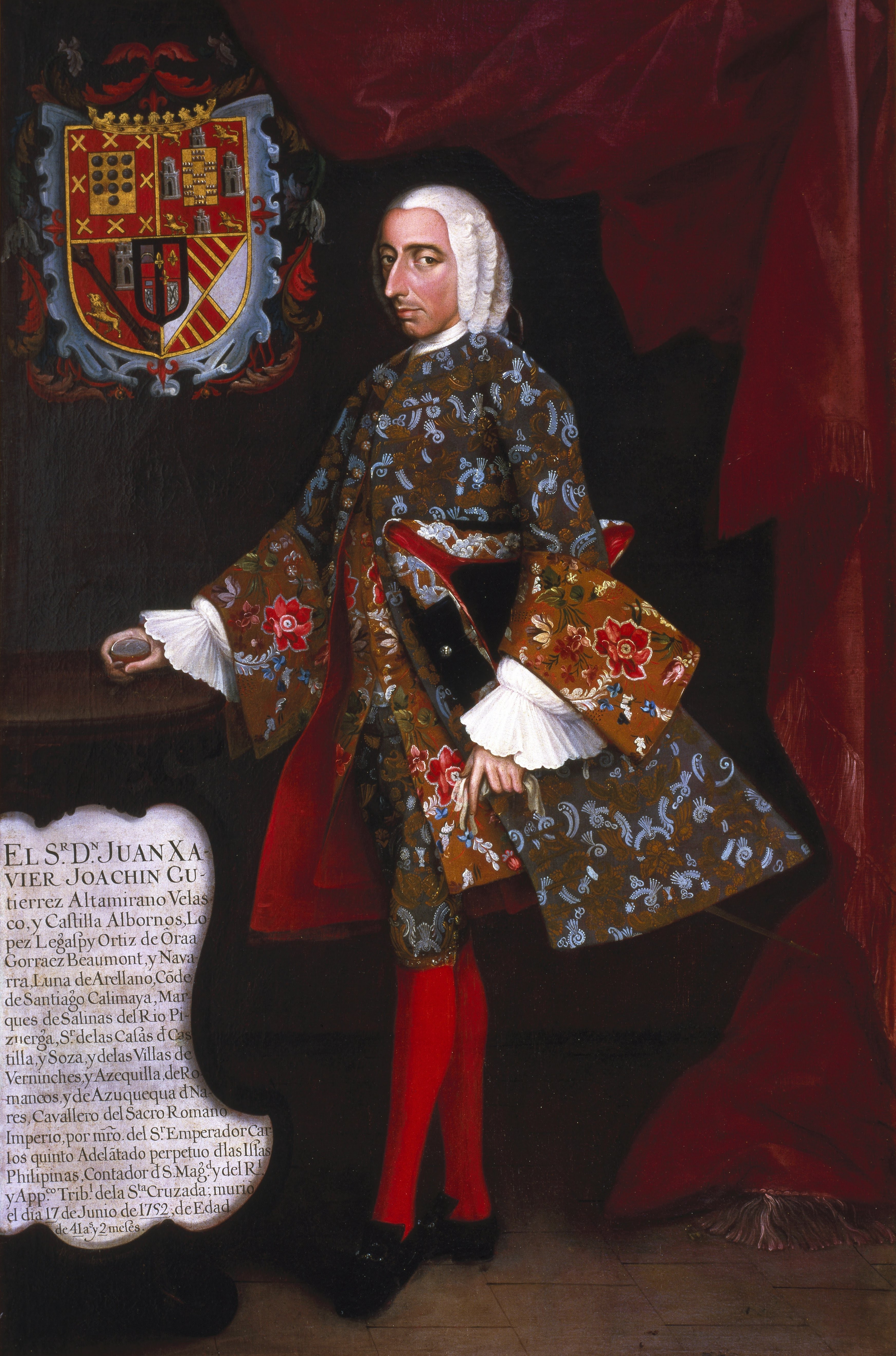
Portrait of "Don Juan Javier Joaquín Gutiérrez-Altamirano de Velasco y Castilla, Albornoz, López de Legazpi, Ortiz de Oraa y Navarra Luna de Arellano, Count of Santiago de Calimaya, Marquess of Salinas del Río Pisuerga, Perpetual and Hereditary Adelantado of Las Filipinas, etc.." by Miguel Cabrera, c. 1752 (Collection of the Brooklyn Museum)

=== Noble titles and knighthoods ===
Most nobles had the status of hidalgos (untitled nobles), whilst a number no greater than one hundred and twenty individuals were granted higher-ranking titles of nobility during the three hundred years of Spanish rule known then as títulos de Castilla (or "titles of Castile"), including those of Viscount, Count, Marquess and Duke. The title of Señor (equivalent to Lord) was often used informally by holders of encomiendas, specially during the 16th century, although there is no proof that such a title was ever explicitly granted by the Crown. Knighthoods of Spanish military orders (Order of Santiago, Alcántara, Calatrava and Montesa) where also granted to members of the nobility, and were less rare at the end of the 18th century, although they could not be considered entirely common. Knights of foreign orders of nobility (like the Order of Saint John or the Order of Christ) were also existent but even rarer than their Spanish equivalents.

The first title granted to a settler in the kingdom of New Spain was that of Marqués del Valle de Oaxaca (Marquess of the Valley of Oaxaca), received by conquistador Hernán Cortés, who was also knighted in the Order of Santiago. Subsequently, others received similar distinctions, including Don Rodrigo de Vivero, a Capitain-General who was made Conde del Valle de Orizaba); Don Pedro Tesifón de Moctezuma, made Conde de Moctezuma de Tultengo); and Don Agustín de Echeverz, governor of the Kingdom of Nuevo León, granted the title of Marqués de San Miguel de Aguayo), amongst many others.

The largest number of Novohispanic noble titles were created in the eighteenth century under the Spanish Bourbon monarchs and were added to by an influx of foreign nobles to Mexico.

The noble titles of New Spain were:

- Marqués del Valle de Oaxaca (1529); Hernán Cortés and descendants
- Marqués de Salinas de Río Pisuerga (1609); Altamirano de Velasco, Cervantes
- Conde de Santiago de Calimaya (1616); Altamirano de Velasco, Cervantes
- Marqués de Villamayor de las Ibernías (1617); Pacheco
- Conde de Valle de Orizaba (1627); Rincón Gallardo
- Conde de Moctezuma (1627) G.E.; Moctezuma de la Cueva
- Marqués de San Miguel de Aguayo (1683); Echevers
- Conde de Miraflores (1689); Garrastegui
- Marqués de la Villa de Villar del Águila (1689); Urrutia
- Conde de Miravalle (1690); Dávalos Bracamonte
- Marqués de Santa Fe de Guardiola (1691); Padilla, López de Peralta, Cervantes
- Marqués de Altamira (1704); Sánchez de Tagle
- Marqués de las Torres de Rada (1704); Lorenz de Rada
- Marqués de Sierra Nevada (1708); Ruiz de Tagle
- Marqués de Salvatierra (1708); Cervantes
- Duque de Atrisco (1708); G.E.; Sarmiento, Romay-Sotomayor
- Conde de Ledesma de la Fuente (1710)′
- Marqués de Villa Hermosa de Alfaro (1711); Rincón-Gallardo
- Conde de San Mateo de Valparaíso (1727); Landa y Escandón
- Marqués de Acapulco (1728); de la Cerda
- Marqués de San Clemente (1730); Busto
- Marqués de las Salinas (1733); Pérez de Tagle
- Conde de Revillagigedo (1749); Revillagigedo
- Marqués de Rivascacho (1764); Cervantes
- Conde de Regla (1768); Romero de Terreros, Rincón Gallardo
- Marqués del Apartado (1772); Fagoaga, Campero
- Conde de la Presa de Jalpa (1775); Cervantes
- Marqués de San Cristóbal (1777); Romero de Terreros, Rincón Gallardo
- Marqués de San Francisco (1777); Romero de Terreros
- Marqués de Guanajuato (1798); Siles
- Conde de Pérez Gálvez (1805); Pérez-Gálvez
- Marqués de Guadalupe Gallardo (1810); Rincón-Gallardo
- Marqués de Yermo (1810); Gabriel de Yermo and descendants (with the right to choose denomination)
- Conde de Heras-Soto (1811); Heras Soto, García Pimentel

=== The nobility in the process of Independence ===
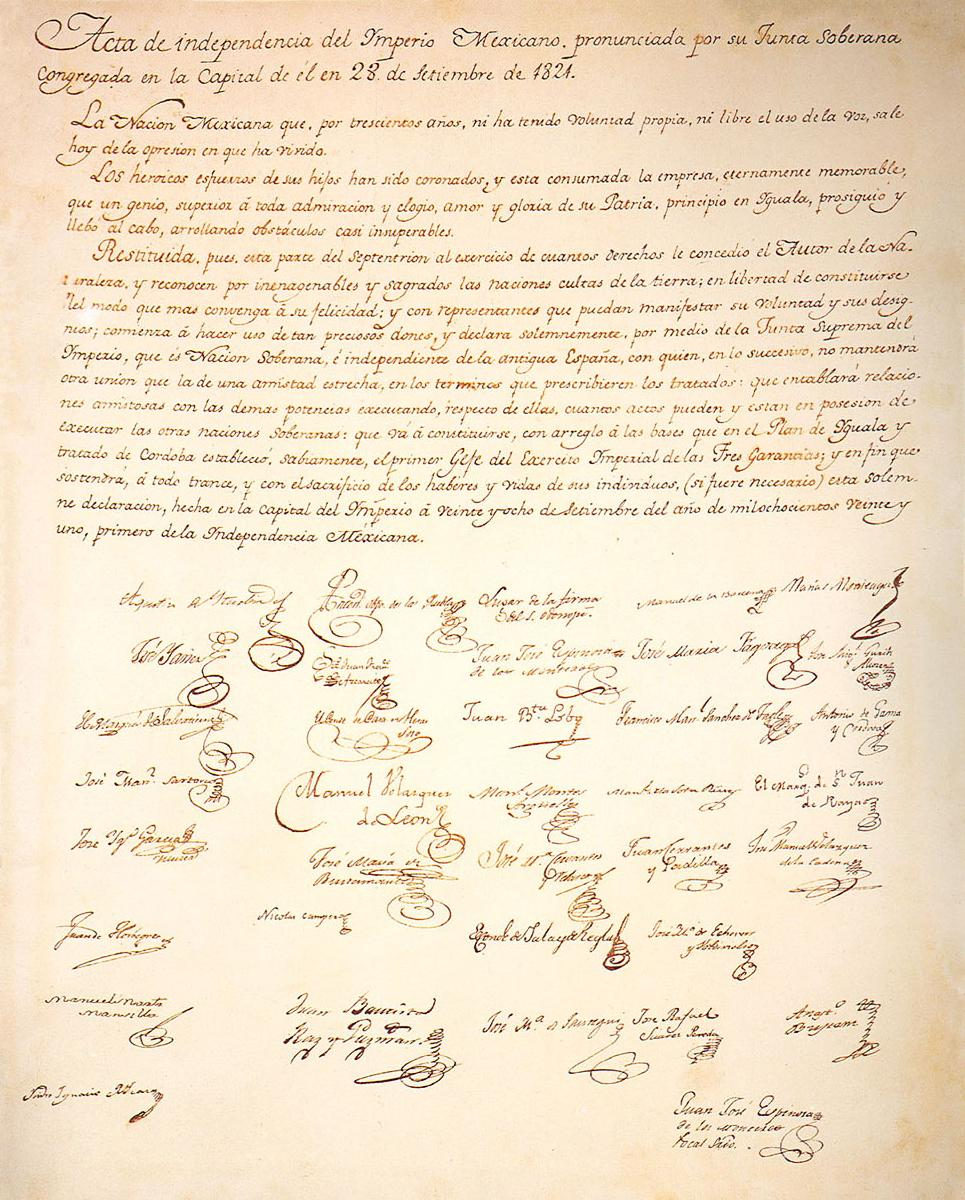
The Declaration of Independence of the Mexican Empire

The process of Mexican independence, as well as others in the former Spanish Americas, was led by members of the local nobility. Initially, members of the provincial nobility such as Miguel Hidalgo, Ignacio Allende, and others, were amongst the first to form an insurrection against the Napoleonic control over Spain and its Empire. Nevertheless, other members of the nobility, like the future Emperor Agustín de Iturbide, Ignacio de Elizondo, the Count of Casa Rul, amongst others, led the resistance against the former insurrectionists. When the Spanish resistance to Napoleon gathered in the city of Cádiz in the year 1812 to form what would later be named as the Cortes of Cádiz, representatives were summoned from all points of the Spanish Empire to organize and fund the resistance (as well as to define the First Constitution of the Kingdom of Spain signed in 1812). This process also had prominent members of the New-Spanish nobility, such as Don José María Gutiérrez de Terán (who served as president of the Cortes), Don Octaviano Obregón (a grandson of the 1st Count of La Valenciana), Don Miguel Ramos (de Arreola) Arizpe (himself a descendant of Bartolomé de Medina), Don José Simeón de Uría y Berrueco (vice-president of the Cortes and defender of racial equality), Don José Miguel Gordoa (president of the Cortes, later bishop of Guadalajara), etc.

Almost ten years after the fall of the first insurrection, Agustín de Iturbide, then commander of the Spanish forces in central Mexico, led the definitive rebellion against Spanish rule, with the aid of many other titled and untitled nobles. Amongst the signers of the Mexican Declaration of Independence are Don Juan José Espinosa de los Monteros, the Marquess of Salvatierra de Peralta, Don José María Fagoaga (a nephew to the Marquess del Apartado), the Count of Heras Soto, Don Francisco Manuel Sánchez de Tagle (from the family of the Marquess of Altamira and the Count of San Mateo de Valparaíso), the Marquess of San Juan de Rayas, the Count of Santiago de Calimaya-Marquess of Salinas del Río Pisuerga, Don Juan Cervantes y Padilla (from the latter family), Don José Manuel Velázquez de la Cadena (from one of Mexico's prominent families), Don Nicolás Campero y Bustamante (related to the Counts of Alcaraz and Casa Flórez), the Count of Regla, the Marquess of San Miguel de Aguayo, Anastasio Ruiz de Bustamante (later president of Mexico), etc.

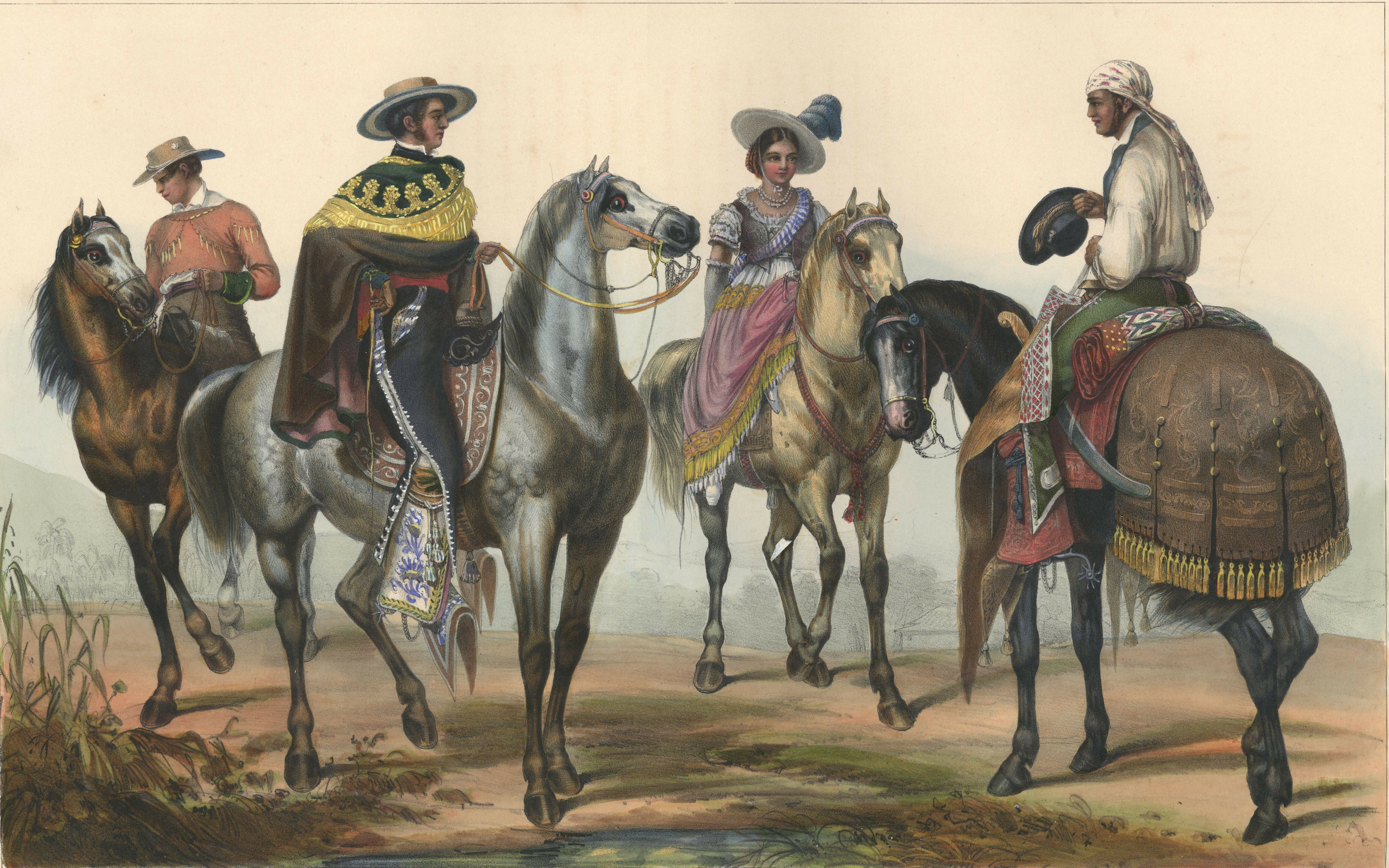
Carl Nebel's representation of an hacienda owner and his mayordomo.

== Nobility of the First Mexican Empire ==
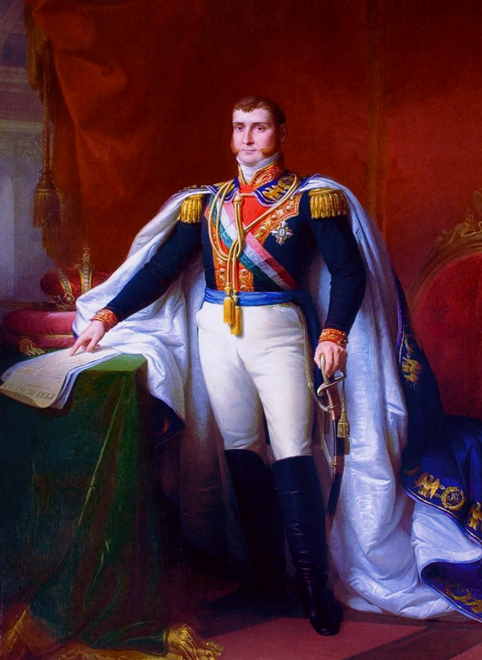
Emperor Agustín I of Mexico (1822–1823)

The independence of the Mexican Empire from Spain happened as an emancipation of powers with a continuity of the precedent political, social, economical and religious system. The first treaty of independence, known as the Treaty of Córdoba, proposed the transferral of King Ferdinand VII of Spain from Europe to Mexico (with the title of Emperor of Mexico), emulating the transferral of Don Pedro IV of Portugal to Brazil a few months before, due to the rise of liberalism in the Iberian Peninsula. The King however, never embarked for Mexico, for which a regency was appointed, and after a social uprising, a new Emperor was sought and later proclaimed in the figure of Agustín de Iturbide. He was the military commander that, once a royalist, turned and led the process of independence (himself a member of the hidalgo class). The new Emperor recognized all pre-existing titles of nobility, as well as nobiliary conditions prescribed under Spanish law, and only granted a few princely dignities to members of his family (including his children and his father, who was proclaimed Prince of the Union), as well as three other titles of nobility, all of which were ratified by the Congress, such as that of Marqués de Samaniego del Castillo (which was already under application with the Spanish Crown). Knighthoods were also created, most notably, the Imperial Order of Guadalupe.

The fall of the First Mexican Empire was followed by the prohibition of use of titles of nobility, from the First Mexican Republic, action which was responded by many nobles with the junction of the prefix "ex" to their titles ("ex-marqués de..", "ex-conde de...", etc.).

=== The Imperial House of Iturbide ===
The Arms of the House of Iturbide, with the Imperial Crown of Mexico as its crest.

The family of Emperor Agustin I had titles created for them such as Mexican Prince, Princess of Iturbide, and Prince of the Union. After the fall of the First Empire shortly after its rise, the imperial family was exiled from Mexico, residing firstly in Italy, and later, in the United States of America. The failed return of the ex-Emperor to Mexico was shortly ended after his arrival with his execution. The headship of the house passed then to his eldest son Don Agustín Jerónimo de Iturbide, who had been proclaimed Prince Imperial by the Mexican Congress of 1822. In 1855, a plan to restore the monarchy in Mexico, proclaimed Prince Agustín Jerónimo as the new Emperor of Mexico, but never came into effect. In 1865, one year after the proclamation of the Second Mexican Empire under the House of Habsburg-Lorraine (see below), Don Agustín (son of Agustín Jerónimo), Don Salvador, and Doña Josefa de Iturbide were proclaimed Princes of Iturbide with the treatment of Highness, ranking just below the new Imperial Family, and put under the tutelage of the new Emperor (never adopted, contrary to popular belief).

=== Return to Exile ===
The fall of the Second Mexican Empire, retook the Iturbide family to exile, where they've stayed ever since. During the Porfiriato, Agustín, Prince of Iturbide, Agustin I's grandson and Maximilian I's adopted son, who had graduated from Georgetown University, renounced his claim to the throne and title. He returned to Mexico and served as an officer in the Mexican army. But in 1890, after publishing articles critical of President Porfirio Díaz, he was arrested on charges of sedition and sentenced to fourteen months of imprisonment. He returned to Georgetown University, as a professor of the Spanish and French languages, and died childless in 1925. Several branches still subsist, most notably through the other adopted son Salvador, being registered and recognized by the Almanach de Gotha.

== Nobility of the Second Mexican Empire ==
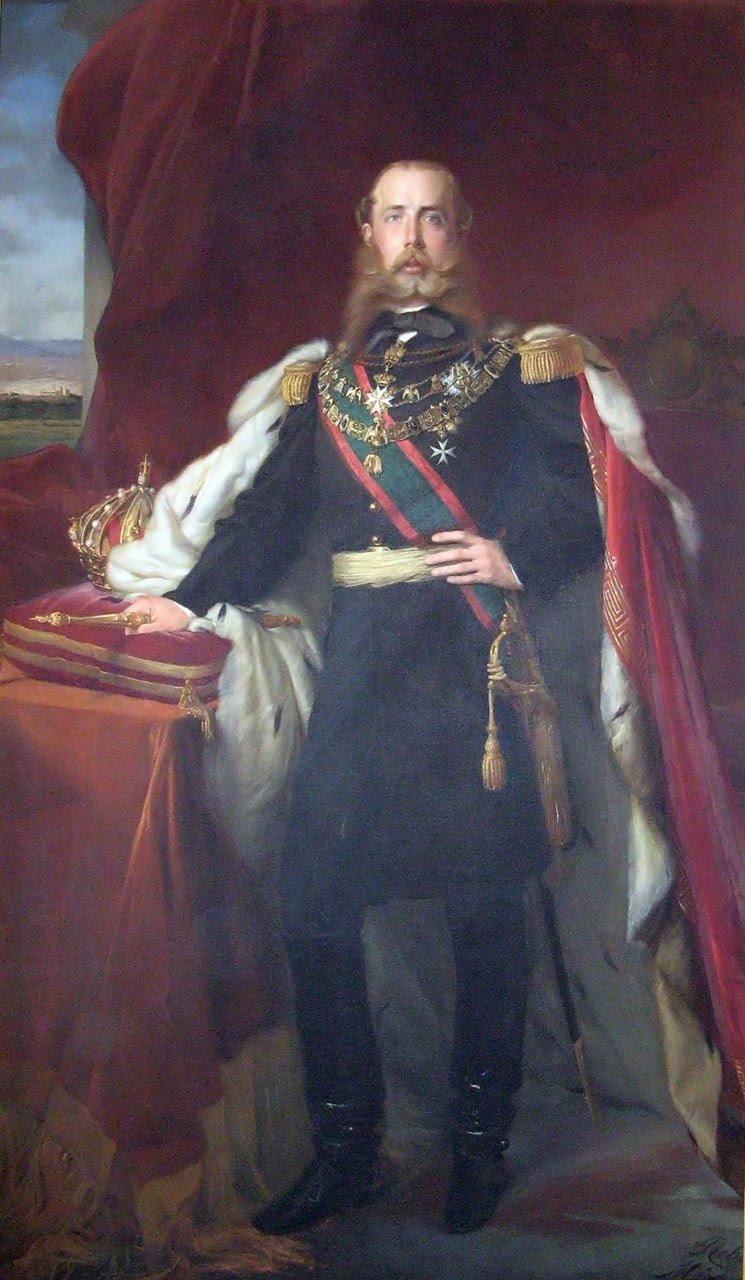
Emperor Maximilian I of Mexico (1864–1867) by Franz Xaver Winterhalter

The 19th century was a time of great political and military turmoil in Mexico, with repetitive wars against the Kingdom of Spain, the Kingdom of France and the United States of America, as well as internal wars provoked by the different visions that the ruling classes had over the ideal model of the new nation. After having lost more than half of its territory to the United States of America, and facing excruciating financial debt, some believed the restoration of a stable monarchy was the best option forward for the restitution of order in a country devoured by its irreconcilable differences. In 1859, Archduke Maximilian of Habsburg-Lorraine, the Viceroy of Lombardy-Venetia (brother to Emperor Franz Joseph of Austria) was first approached by Mexican monarchists led by José Pablo Martínez del Río — with a proposal to become the emperor of Mexico. The Habsburg family had ruled the Viceroyalty of New Spain from its establishment (see above).

The quest of restitution of the monarchy had begun long before, ever since the deposition of Emperor Agustín I by General Antonio López de Santa Anna (styled His Serene Highness by the Mexican Congress), who preferred, as many others the candidacy of a Bourbon or Habsburg prince (for their historical relation with the Spanish Empire), instead of that of a local provincial hidalgo. After many negotiations between Napoleon III, his Mexican supporters, and foreign powers, the candidacy of Maximilian was accepted and he arrived in Mexico in 1864.

Several members of the old Mexican nobility were enthusiastic about the monarchical restitution and even traveled to Miramar Castle to officially offer the Mexican crown to the Archduke and his wife Charlotte of Belgium (daughter of King Leopold I of the Belgians), who later was known as Carlota.

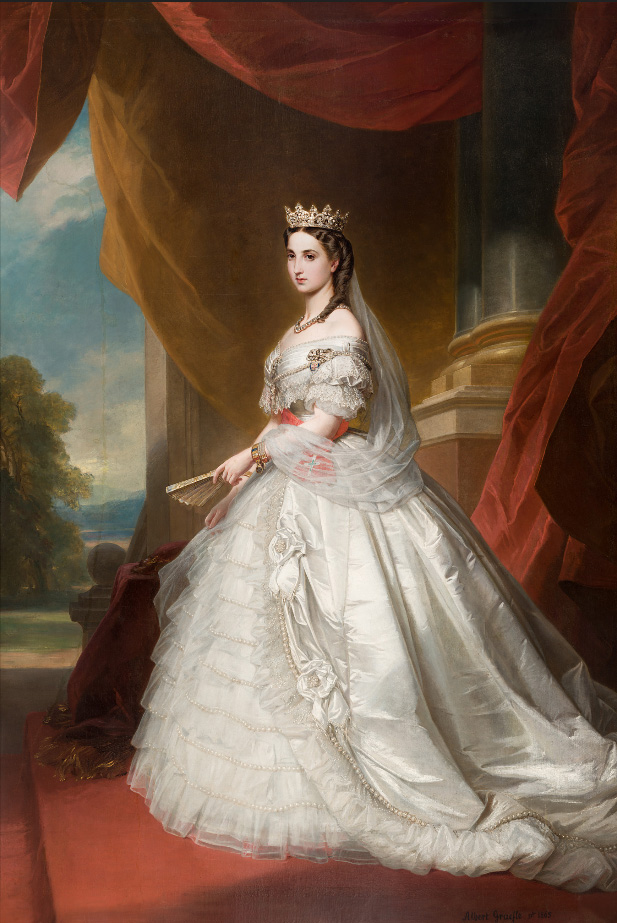
Portrait of Empress Carlota of Mexico, 1865, which hangs in Chapultepec Castle, Mexico City. She had many ladies-in-waiting from the Mexican nobility.

Contrary to his supporters expectations, the new emperor was a profound liberal, who did little to reinforce the powers of the conservatives, the Catholic Church, or the old Mexican nobility (which were his only supporters). During his short reign he re-established the Imperial Order of Guadalupe (which had also been active during the rule of López de Santa Anna), he also founded the Imperial Order of the Mexican Eagle (precedent to the present Order of the Aztec Eagle), and the Imperial Order of San Carlos (given to ladies of the Court and to foreign princesses). During his short lived Empire, the Imperial Court was filled with Austrian, German, French and Italian nobles (several of which stayed in Mexico after the fall of the Empire), who were sometimes at odds with the old Mexican nobles. He invited liberal politicians to his government and his court, and often gave them membership in the Imperial Orders, as well as appointing their consorts as ladies-in-waiting to the Empress. Although his Court implicitly recognised all pre-existing titles (as well as those of the foreigners who accompanied him), nothing was done to give them official status, and the only new titles which were created were those of the Princes Iturbide. The Emperor and Empress themselves did not have any offspring (although there were rumours of a miscarriage), which left the Imperial house without a direct successor.

== Other notable Mexican noble families ==
The direct lines of descent from the original nucleus of nobility, originating with the first conquistadors and encomenderos in the 16th century, mostly survived to this day only through matronymic connections. This is the case for example with the Cortés, Echeverz, Guerrero-Dávila, Sandoval and Vivero families. Leading noble families active in 17th through 19th century politics, economy, clergy, arts and culture of Mexico included: De la Llamosa, Gómez de Cervantes, Romero de Terreros, de la Cámara or Cámara, Rincón-Gallardo, Riverol, Ríos, Pérez Gálvez, Rul, Vivanco, La Canal, Cañedo, Fernández de Jáuregui, Obando, Fernández de Córdoba, Gómez de Parada, Lara, Lorenz de Rada, Pérez de Salazar, Ruiz de Velasco, Valdivieso, De Haro y Tamariz, De los Ríos, Fagoaga, Echeverz, Dávalos de Bracamonte, Peón, Gutiérrez-Altamirano, Castañiza, Gómez de la Cortina, Urrutia, Velasco, Del Río, Moncada, Diez de Sollano, de Busto y Moya, Reynoso y Manso de Zúñiga, Capetillo, de la Parra, Villaseñor-Cervantes, Villaseñor-Jasso, López de Zárate, Camino, Caserta, Trebuesto, Ruiz de Esparza, García de Teruel, Espinosa de los Monteros, Vizcarra, Rábago, Sardaneta, Martínez del Río, Ozta, Azcárate y Ledesma, de la Torre Ledesma, Molina Flores, Vera Martinez y Cazarez, Samaniego del Castillo, Lemus, Mier, De la Maza, González de Betolaza, López de Peralta, Padilla, Diez-Gutiérrez, Flores-Alatorre, Cosío, Rivadeneyra, de la Cotera, de la Campa y Cos, Rodríguez Sáenz de Pedroso, Padilla, Rivascacho, Villar-Villamil, Rodríguez Rico, Sánchez de Tagle, Báez de Benavides, Cabrero, Hurtado de Mendoza, López-Portillo, García Pimentel, Meade, Sánchez-Saráchaga, Sainz-Trápaga, Villaurrutia, Errazu, Escandón, Heredia de la Pierre, Quintanar, Beovide, Alvarez de Medina, Sánchez de Aldana, Siles, Yermo, de Yturbe, de Béistegui, de Rivera, Zubaran-Capmany and Sánchez-Navarro, among others.

Members of the Rincón Gallardo, Del Río, Fagoaga and Pimentel families (marqués de Guadalupe and marqués del Apartado) were active in Mexico City government, the ministry of Foreign Affairs, the Senate, the armed forces, and the Academia de la Lengua or the Sociedad de Geografía e Historia. Many journeyed and lived abroad, often doing so in Paris, London, and Madrid. Many men from these families studied at British public or private schools, as had been the custom since before independence.

== Foreign nobility in Mexico ==
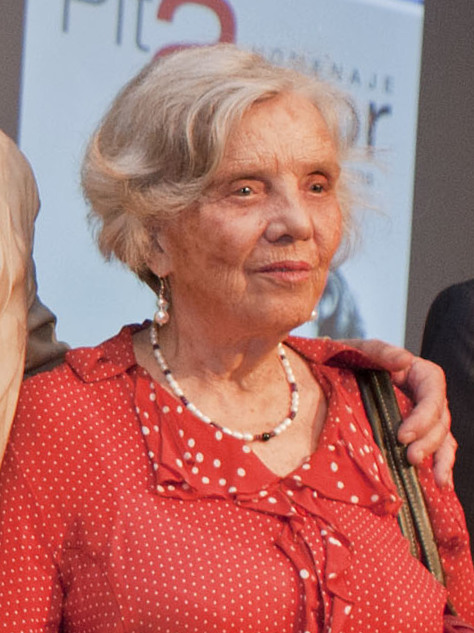
Mexican author Elena Poniatowska is a direct descendant of Prince Kazimierz Poniatowski, brother of King Stanislaw II, last elective monarch of the Polish-Lithuanian Commonwealth.

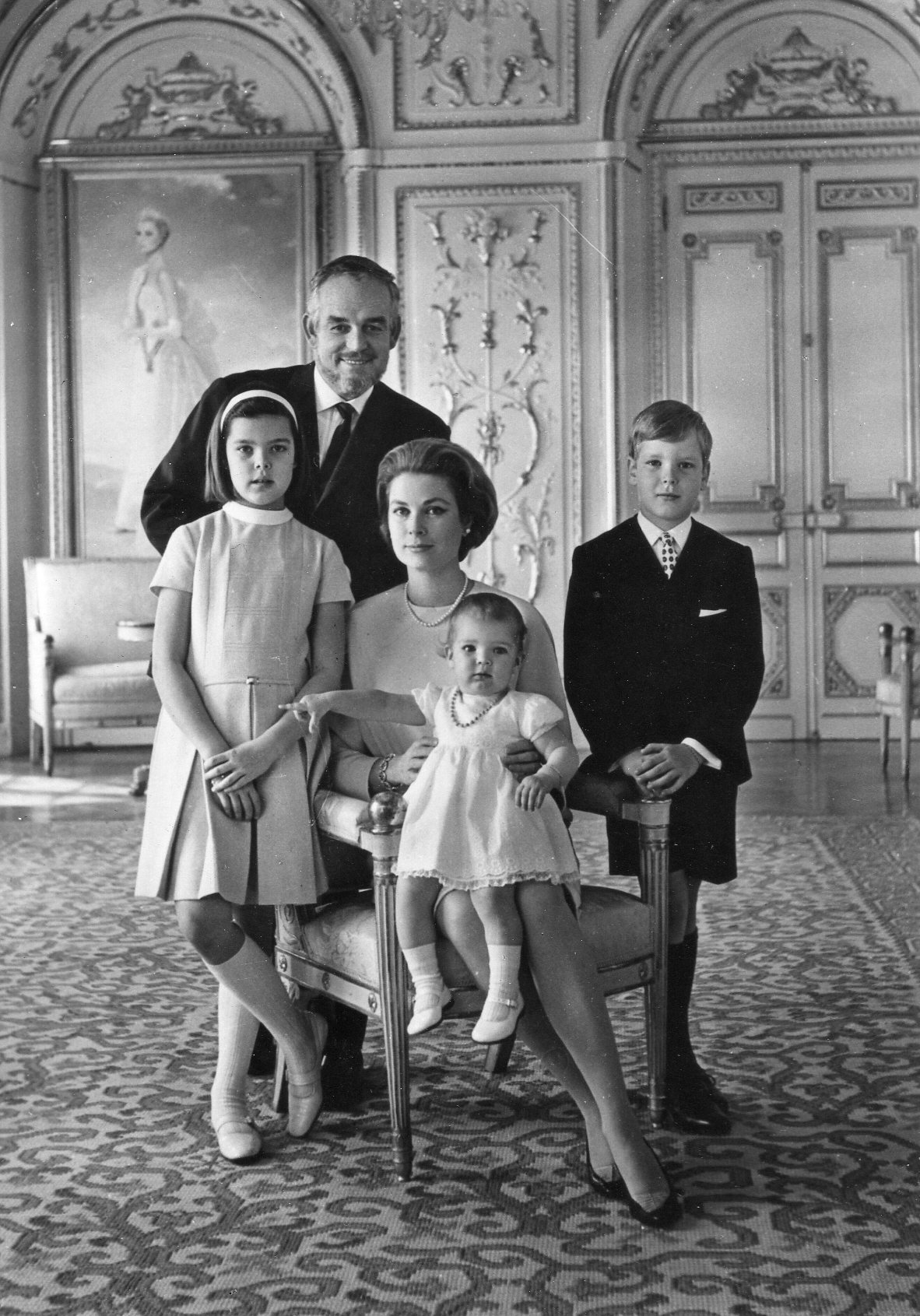
Prince Rainier III of Monaco was the son of Mexican-French aristocrat Count Pierre de Polignac

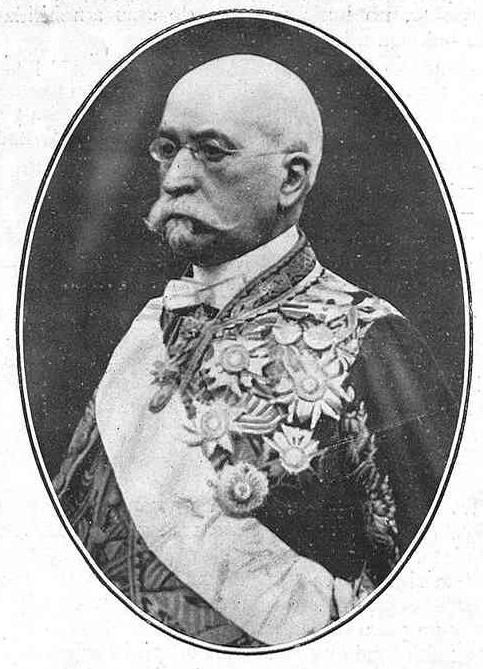
Mexican born Don Ventura García-Sancho e Ibarrondo, 1st Count of Consuegra, Duke of Nájera, Grandee of Spain (jure uxoris)

Throughout the 19th century, several Mexican individuals and their descendants received titles of nobility from foreign nations, including the Vatican, the Kingdom of Spain, and others. Additionally, many bearers of foreign titles have moved to Mexico during its long history.

=== Pontifical nobility ===
Pontifical titles of nobility were granted by the Pope. These titles are sometimes known as títulos negros and include the titles of the marqués de Barrón, conde de Subervielle, conde del Valle (Fernández del Valle family), duque de Mier, amongst others. Many of these families were previously part of the Mexican and Spanish hidalgo class, while others proceeded from France or other countries.

=== Spanish nobility ===
Several titles which were in existence at the time of the Spanish rule over Mexico are still legally recognized to this day by Spain, although very few continued to be passed down following their prohibition in Mexico, falling in the hands of distant or obscure Spanish relatives who spend great sums for "rehabilitating" them through the 19th and 20th centuries.

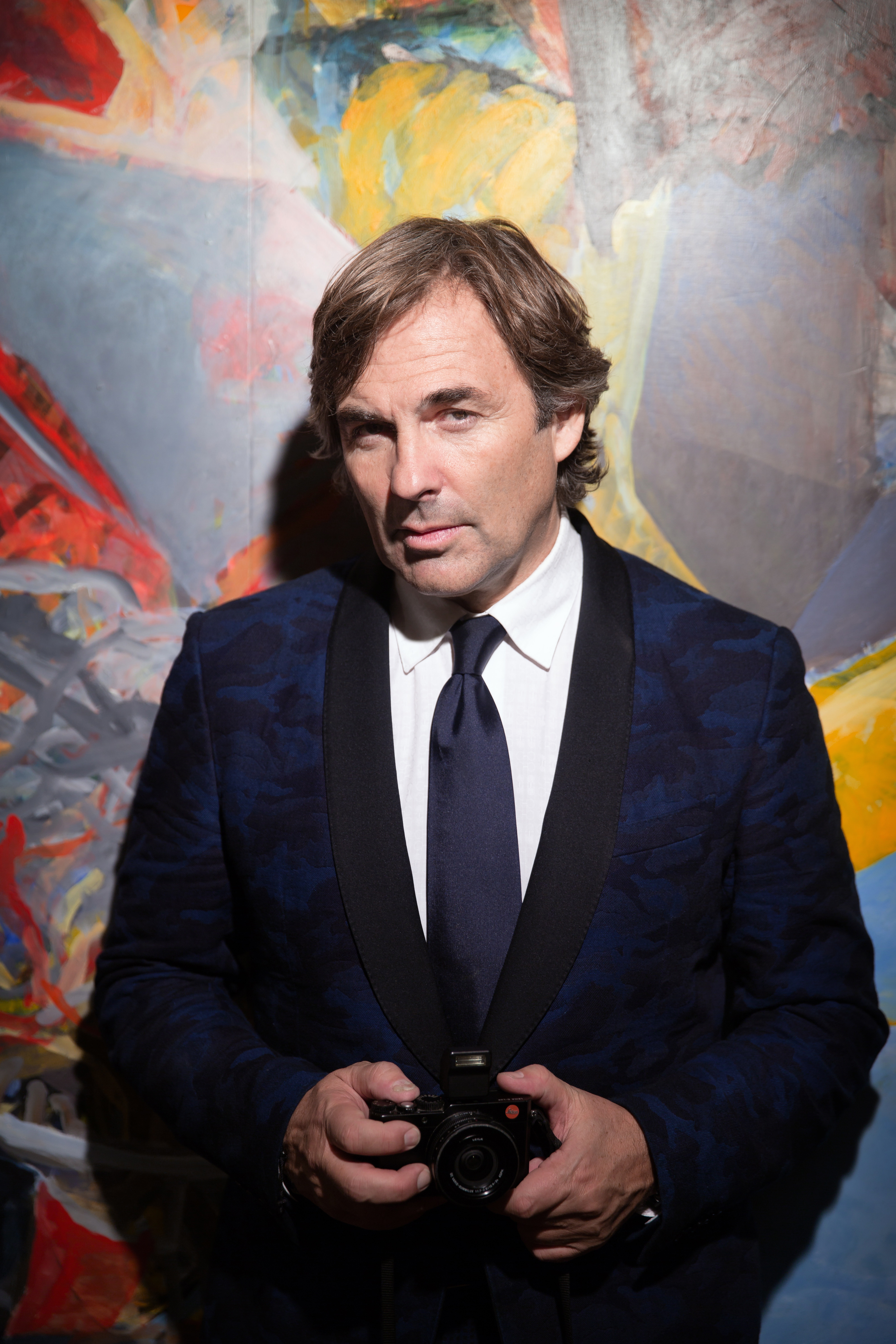
Prince Hubertus von Hohenlohe-Langenburg has represented Mexico in the 1984, 1988, 1992, 1994, 2010 and 2014 Winter Olympics

In addition, a few Mexican families who permanently or temporarily settled in Spain after Mexican Independence continued to be granted distinctions and titles of nobility from the Spanish monarchs, such as the Duke of Regla (Grandee of Spain), Marquess of Morante, Duchess of Prim (Grandee of Spain), Marquess of Bermejillo del Rey, amongst others. Other Mexican individuals acquired their titles jure uxoris (through marriage), passing them down to their descendants, such as the Duke of Castro-Terreño (Grandee of Spain), Marquess of Montehermoso, Count of Triviana, Count of Echauz and Count of Ezpeleta de Veire (all held by the Mexican Sánchez-Navarro family). Mexican-born Don Ventura García-Sancho e Ibarrondo (1837–1914), both received the Spanish title of Count of Consuegra and became Duke of Nájera (Grandee of Spain), also Marquess of Aguilar de Campoo, amongst many other titles through marriage (passed down to his descendants).

Other members of Spanish nobility moved to Mexico for different reasons, taking their titles with them and bequeathing them to their Mexican descendants. These include the Duke of Sessa (Grandee of Spain), Count of Altamira, the Duke of Huete (Grandee of Spain), amongst many others.

=== French nobility ===
Several members of the French nobility moved to Mexico at different times in history, including the descendants of Louis Jucherau de Saint-Denis, those of count Melchior de Polignac (through his marriage to Susana de la Torre y Mier, sister of Ignacio de la Torre y Mier), including their son Prince Pierre, Duke of Valentinois, and through him the present Princely House of Monaco.

=== Austrian nobility ===
Archduke Felix of Habsburg and his wife Princess Ana Eugenia d'Arenberg settled in Mexico after the fall of the Austrian Empire in 1918, with most of their offspring remaining in Mexico ever since. Archduke Felix was the son of the last Emperor of Austria (Emperor Charles I of Austria) and great-grand nephew of Maximilian I of Mexico.

=== Italian nobility ===
Members of the Italian nobility were present in Mexico as early as the 16th century, including a contingency of Genoese bankers that partially funded the Cortés Expedition (the Genoese represented one third of the troops of Cortés). Princess Maria Beatrice of Savoy, daughter of the last King of Italy, Umberto II, also settled in Mexico after the fall of the Italian monarchy, having married Argentinian diplomat Luis Reyna-Corvallán in Ciudad Juárez. Other members of the Italian nobility include members of the Mapelli-Mozzi, Caravita di Sirignano, and many others. At the end of the 19th century, the Marquess of Grimaldi was one of the major landowners of the State of Veracruz.

=== Polish nobility ===
French-born Mexican author Elena Poniatowska (nicknamed The Red Princess) is the daughter of Prince Jean-Joseph Poniatowski and Mexican-born María Dolores Amor e Yturbe, herself a cousin of Carlos de Beistegui.

== Current status ==
At the beginning of the 20th century, the Mexican nobility – both titled and untitled – consisted of approximately 1.5% of Mexico's population, or approximately 200,000 people. The Political Constitution of Mexico expressly prohibits the state from recognizing (or granting) any titles of nobility since 1917. Mexicans are also prohibited from accepting foreign distinctions without permission from the Congress of the Union.

== Gallery ==
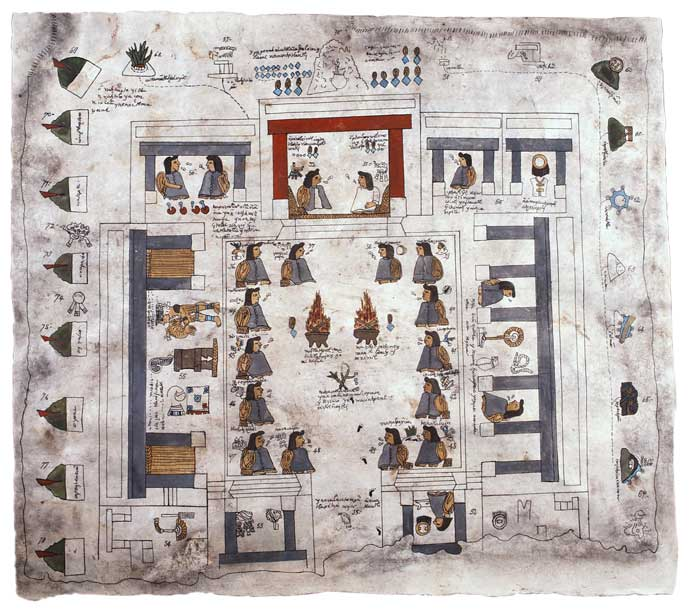
Representation of the Palace of Emperor Nezahualcóyotl of the Mexica in the Quinatzin Codex

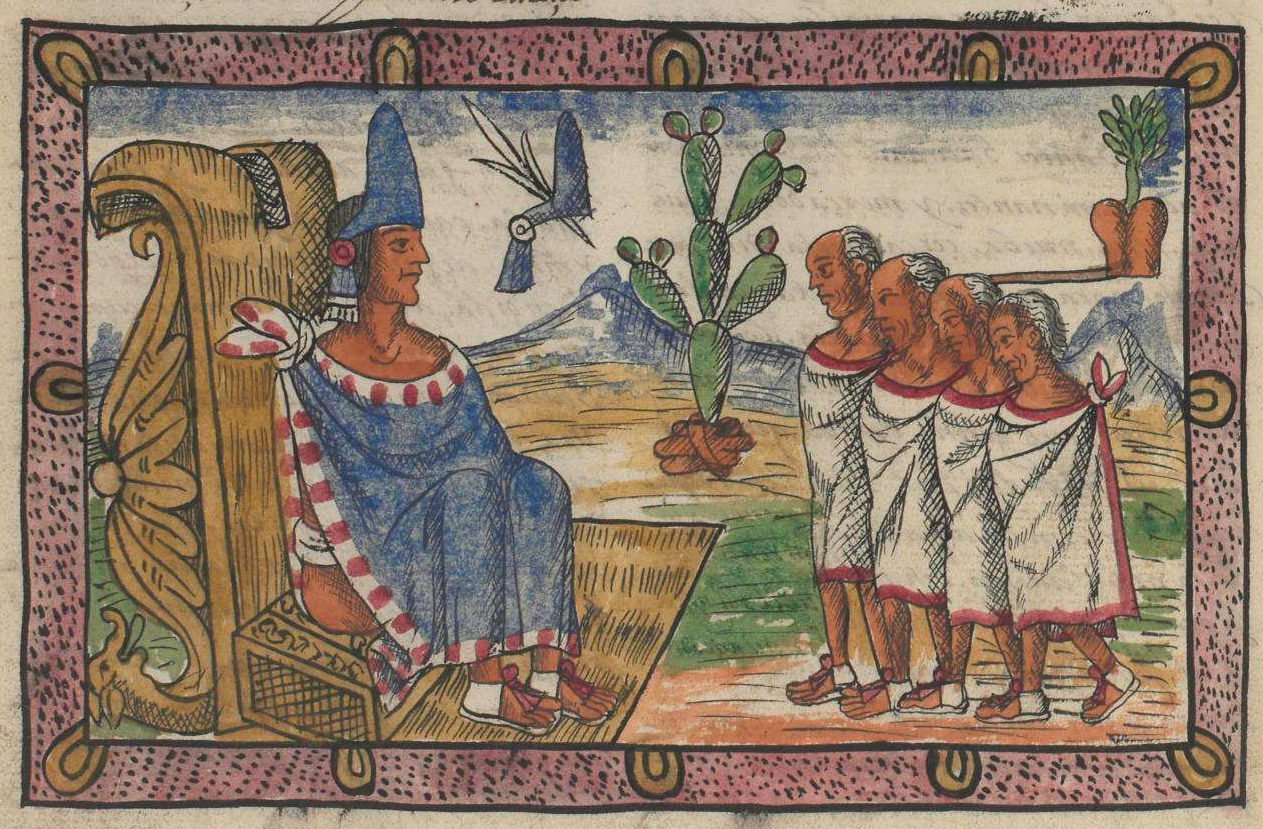
Portrait of Emperor Moctezuma II in the Durán Codex

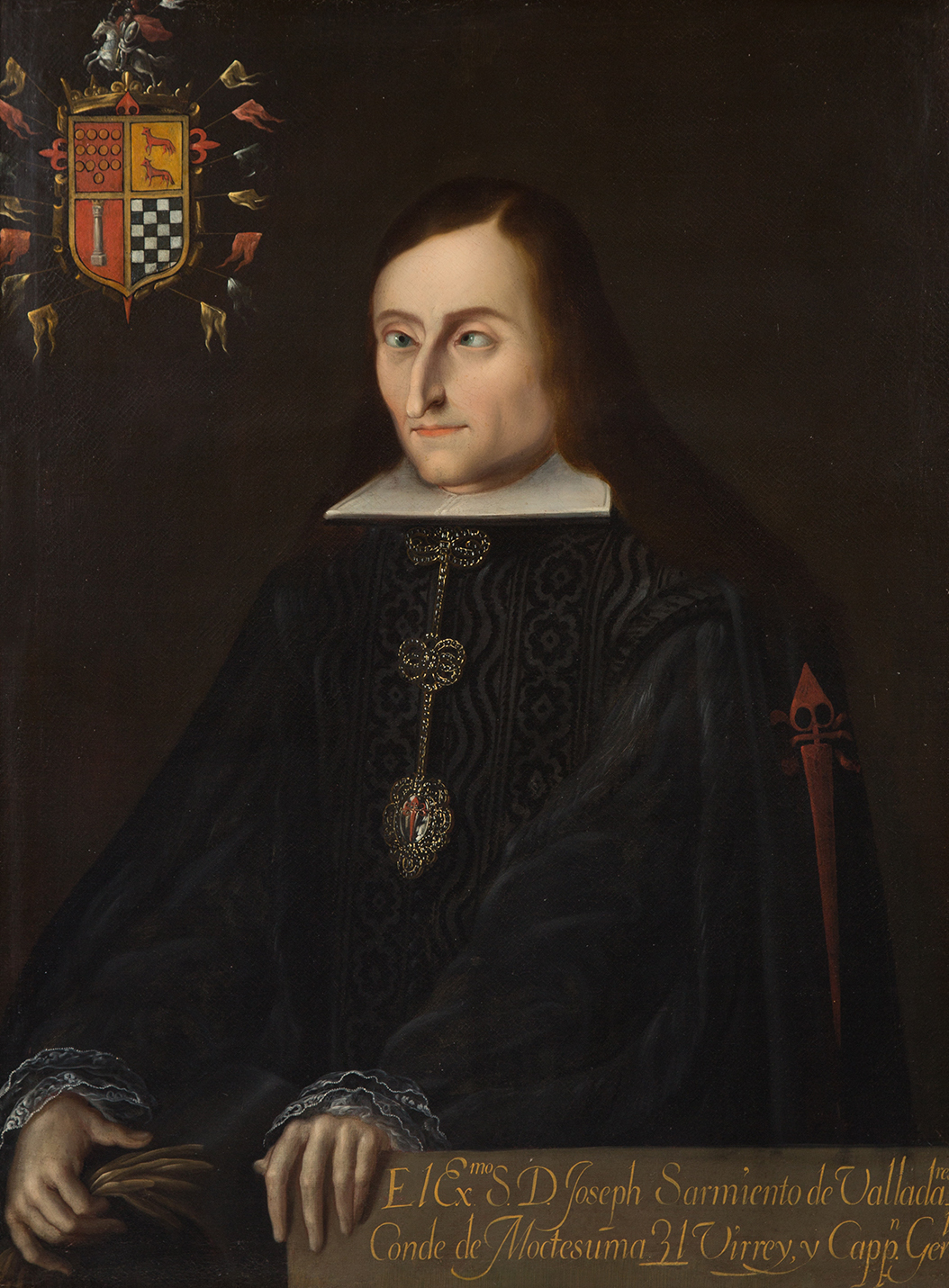
Portrait of the Viceroy Count of Moctezuma (jure uxoris) and 1st Duke of Atrisco, who held the title by marriage to a descendant of Moctezuma II.

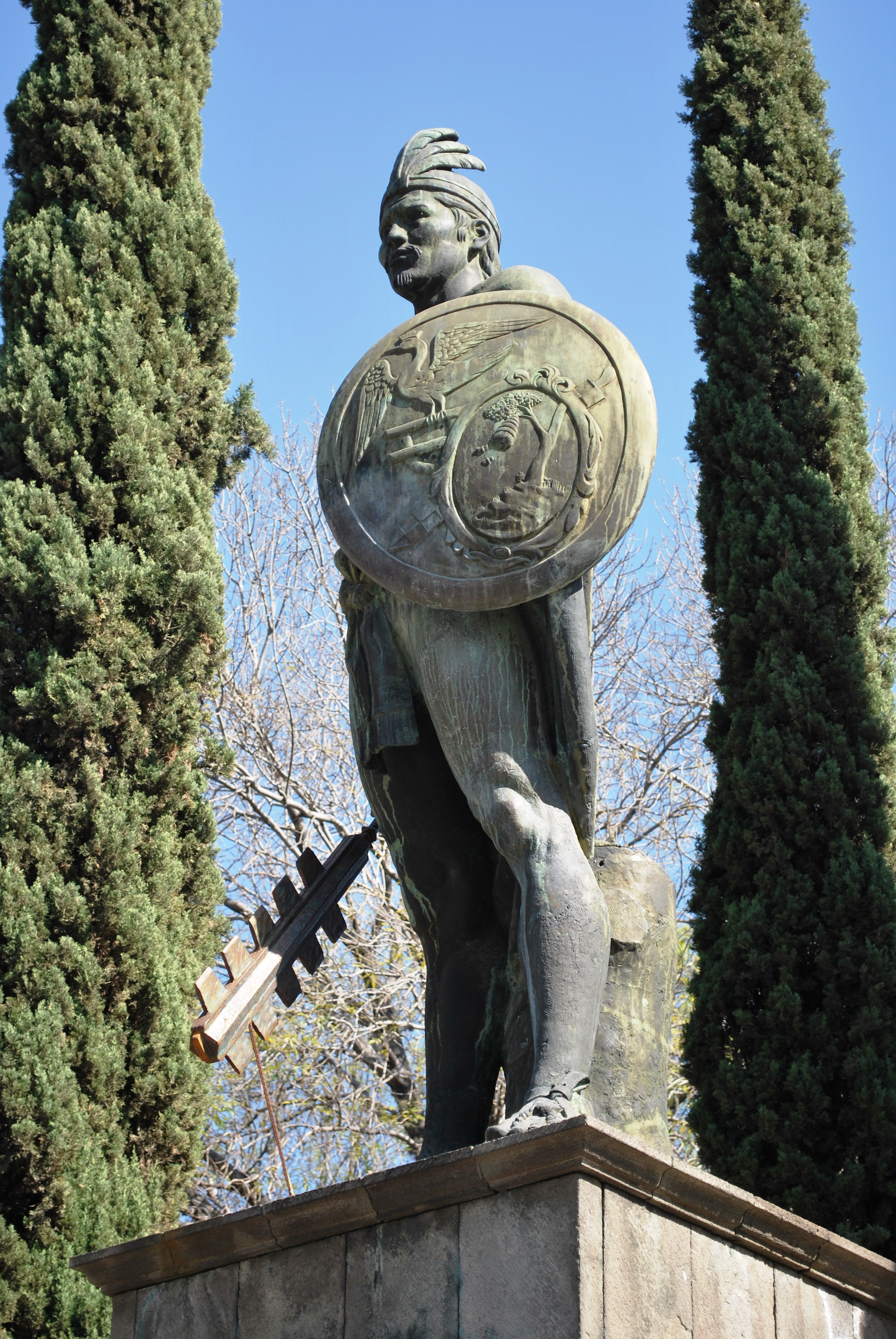
Statue of Prince Xicoténcatl of the Tlaxcaltecs in the city of Tlaxcala

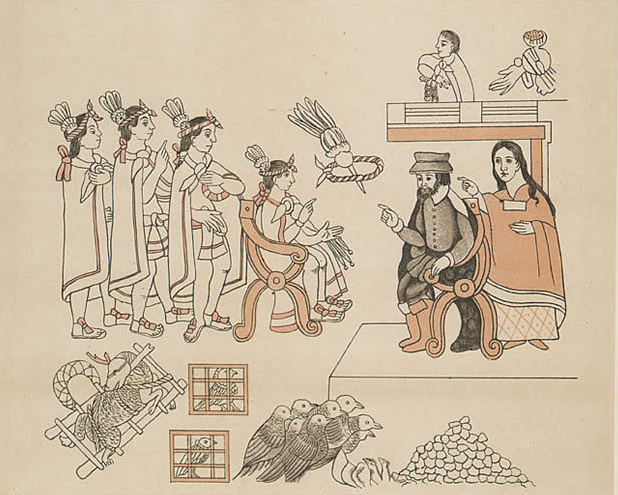
Representation of La Malinche, herself the daughter of the Cacique of Oluta and Xaltipa, and the owner of the encomienda of Huilotlan

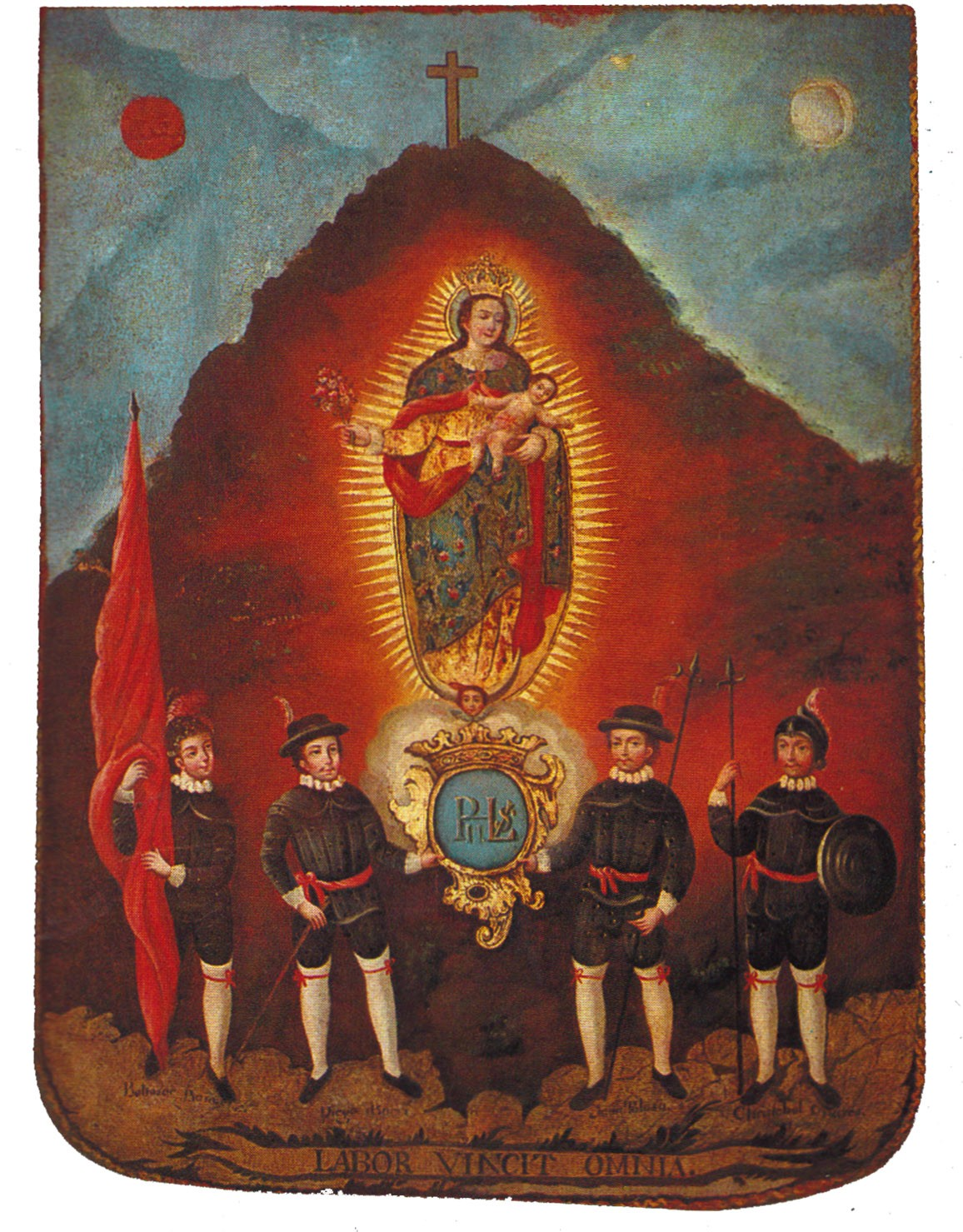
Coat of arms of the City of Zacatecas with the portraits of its four noble founders

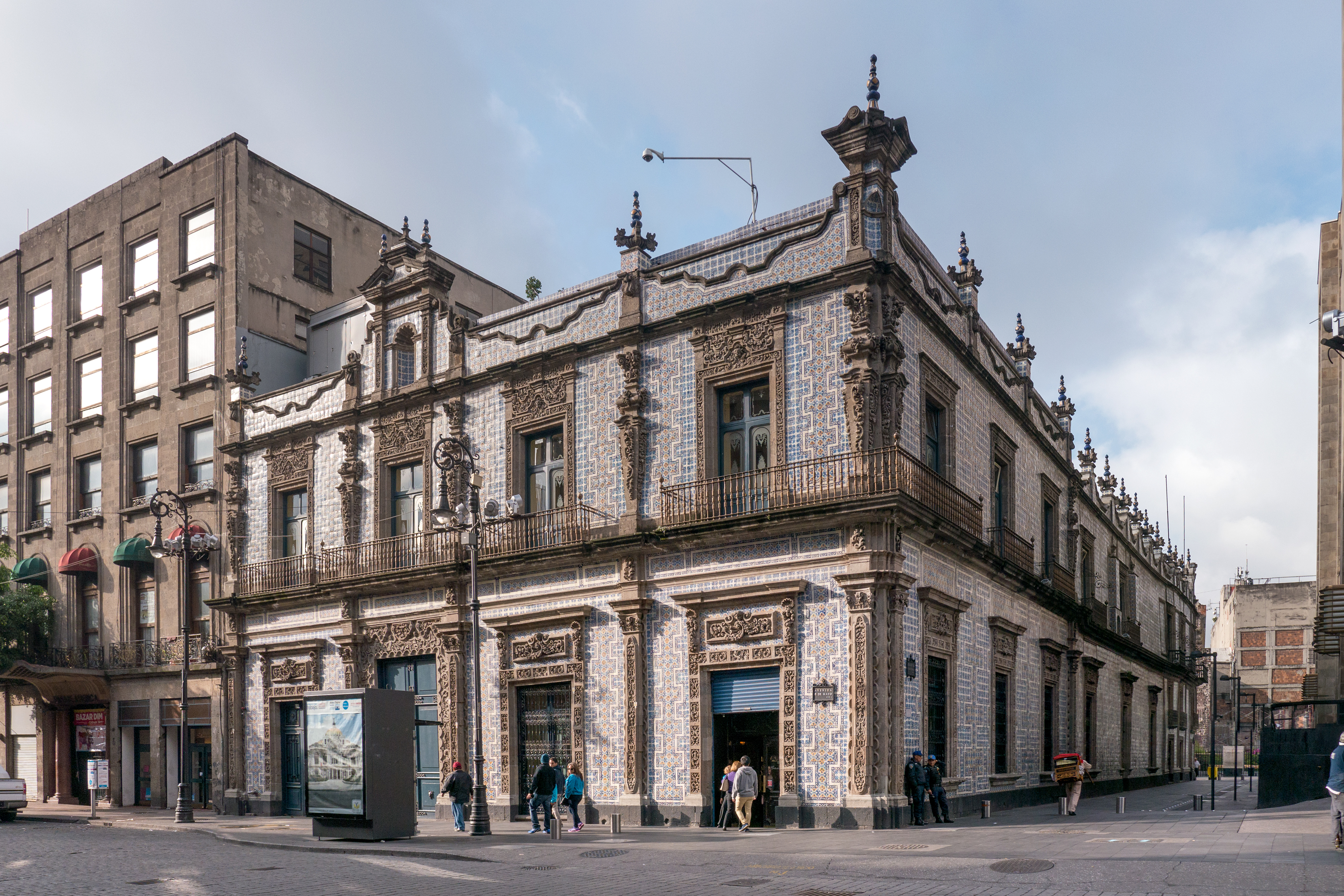
La Casa de los Azulejos in Mexico City was once the Palace of the Counts of El Valle de Orizaba

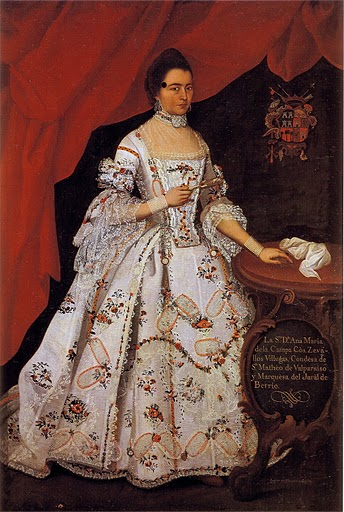
Portrait of Doña Ana María de la Campa y Cos, 2nd Countess of San Mateo de Valparaíso and consort Marchioness of Jaral de Berrio

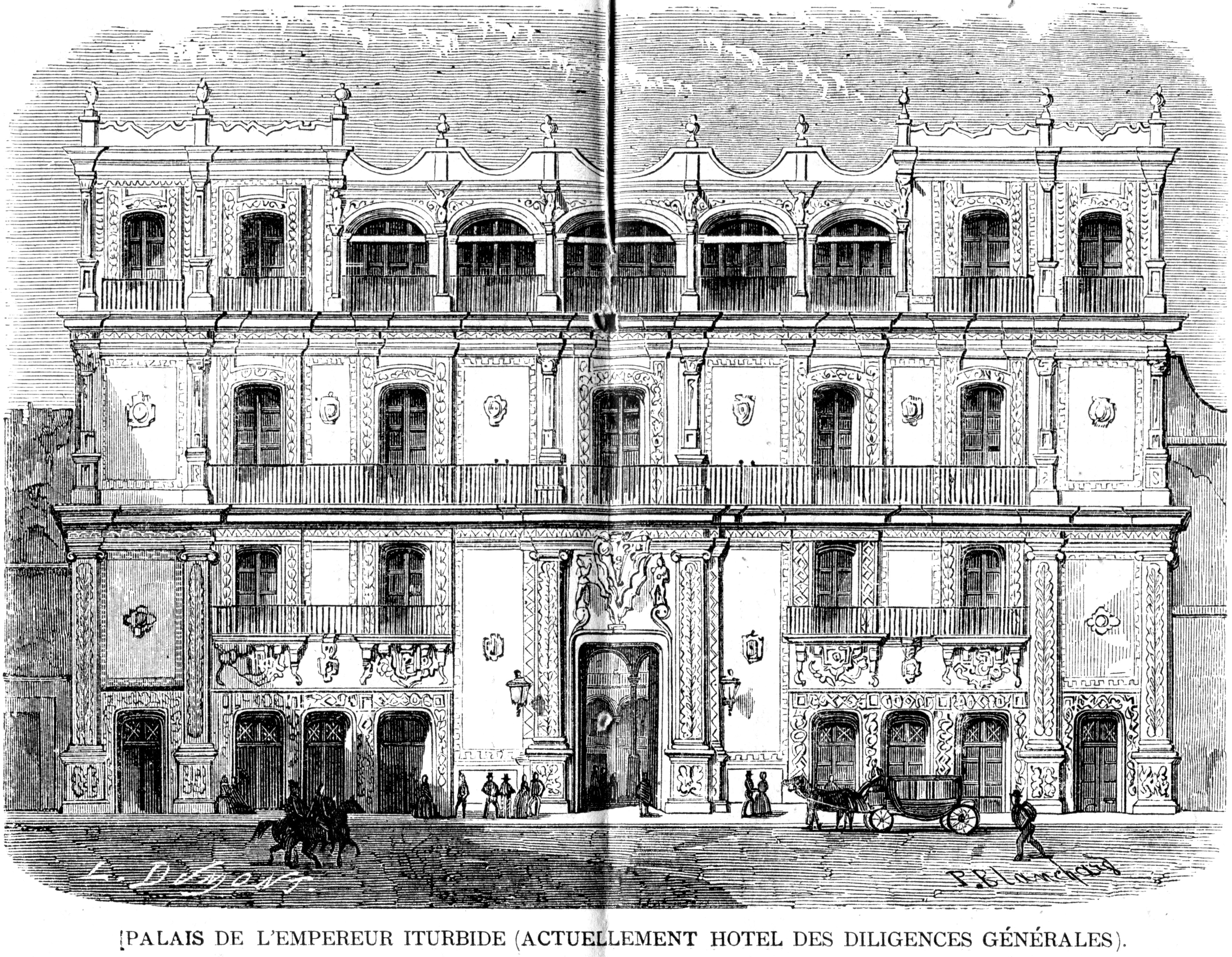
The Iturbide Palace in Mexico City was once the Palace of the Marquesses of Jaral de Berrio

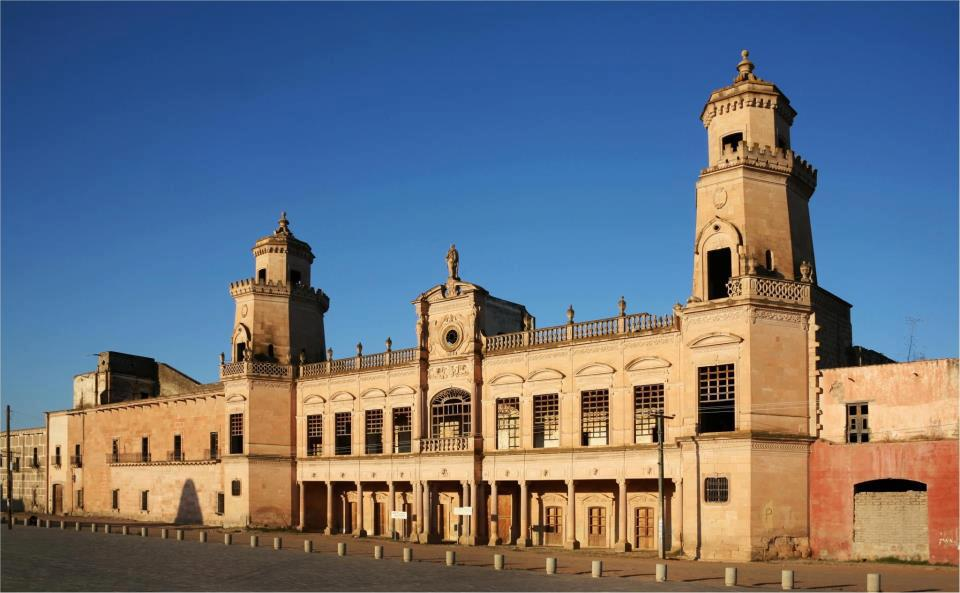
The Hacienda of Jaral de Berrio in the State of Guanajuato, former property of the Marquesses of Jaral de Berrio

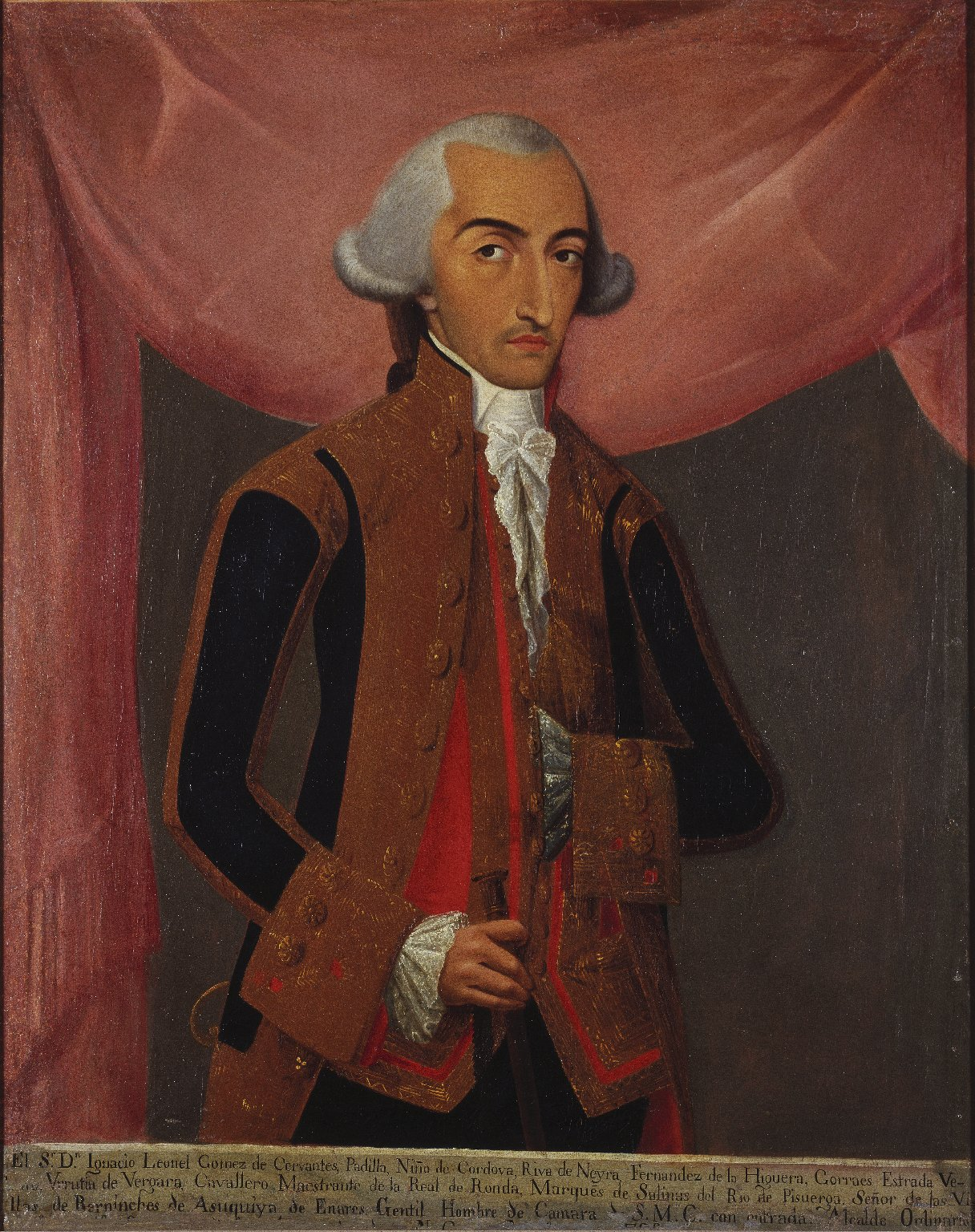
Don Ignacio Leonel de Cervantes y Padilla, father to the 9th Marquess of Salinas del Río Pisuerga

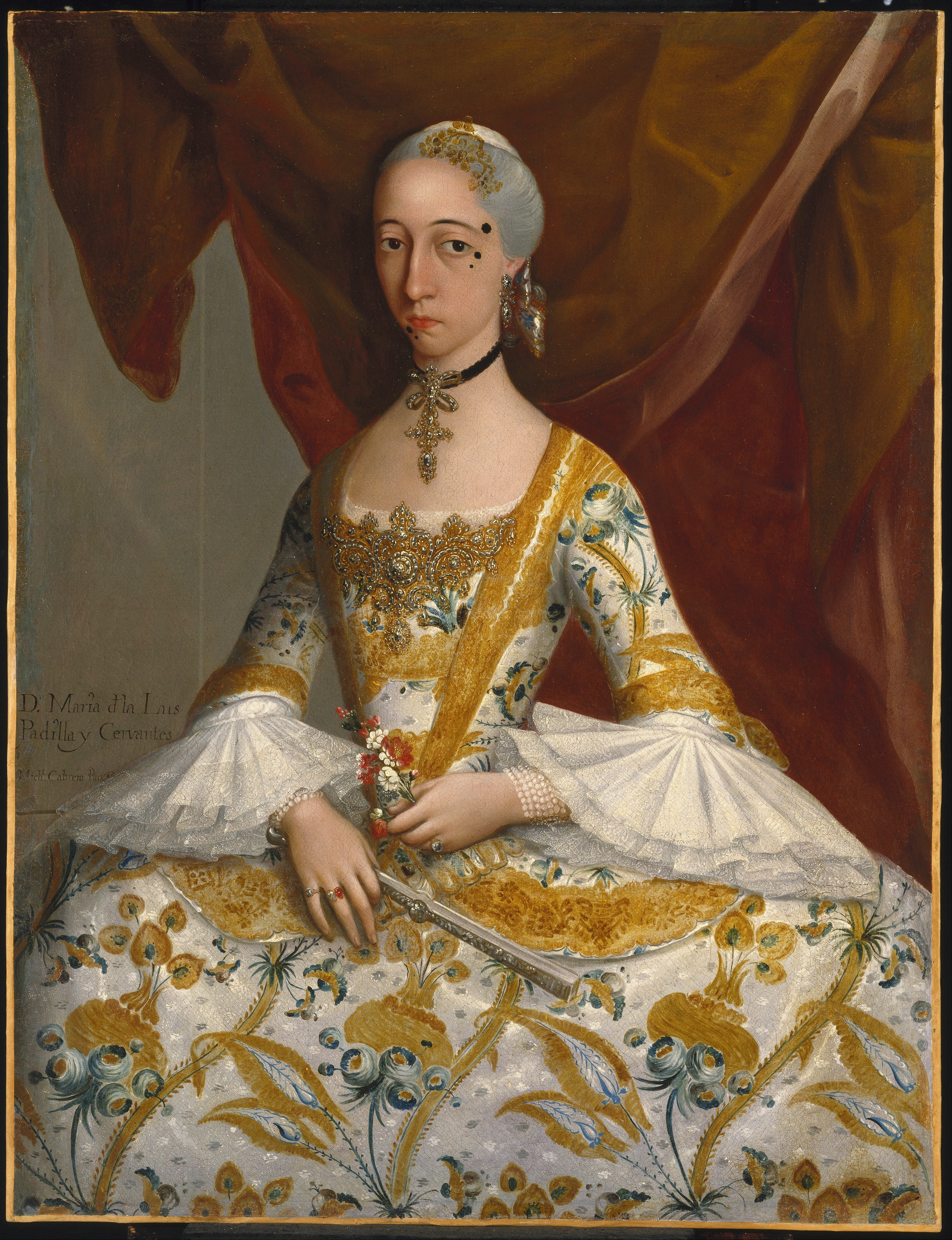
Portrait of Doña María de la Luz Padilla y Cervantes, daughter to the 4th Marquess of Santa Fe de Guardiola, painted by Miguel Cabrera

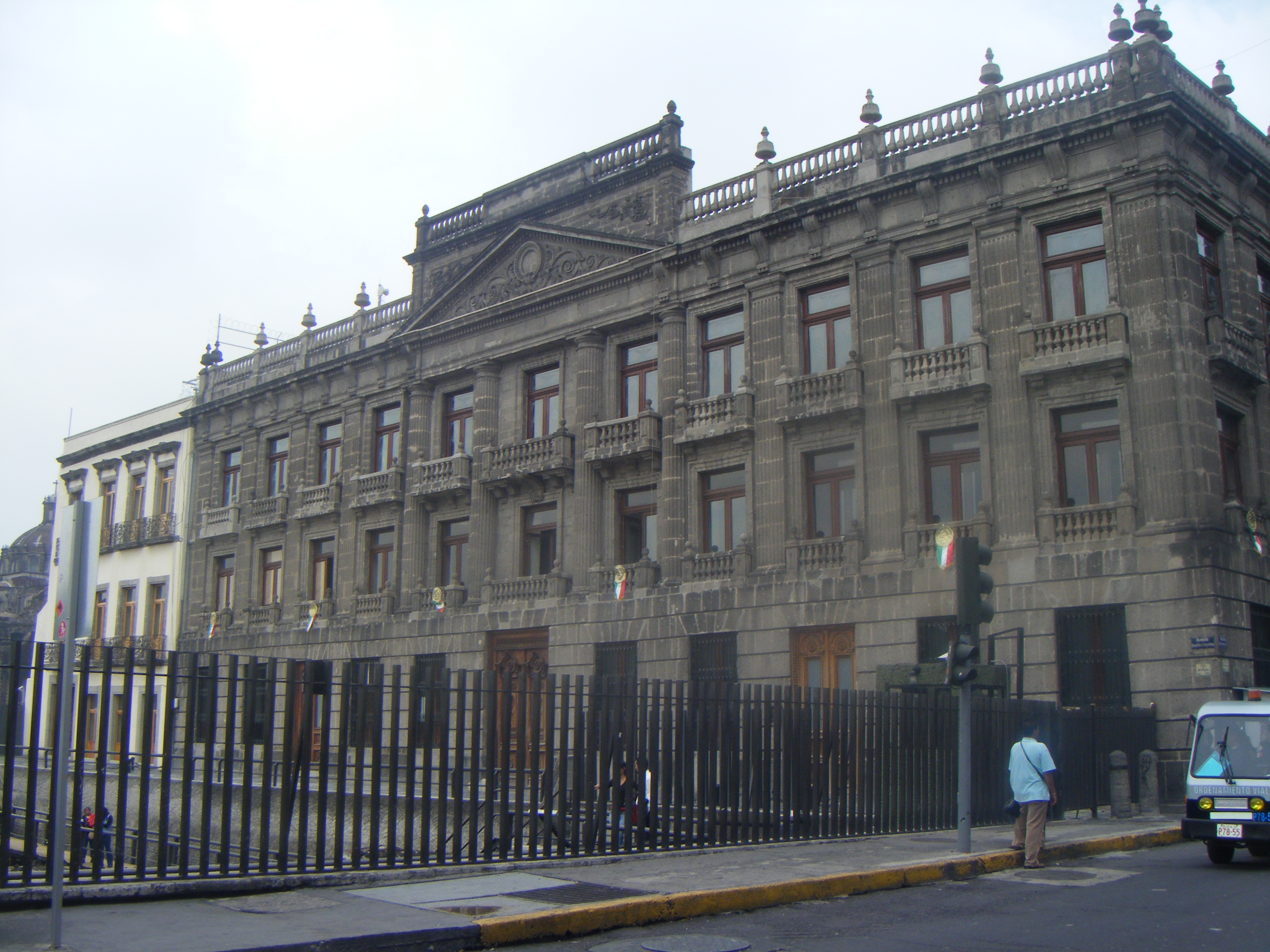
The former Palace of the Marquesses of El Apartado, in front of Mexico City's Templo Mayor, designed by Manuel Tolsá

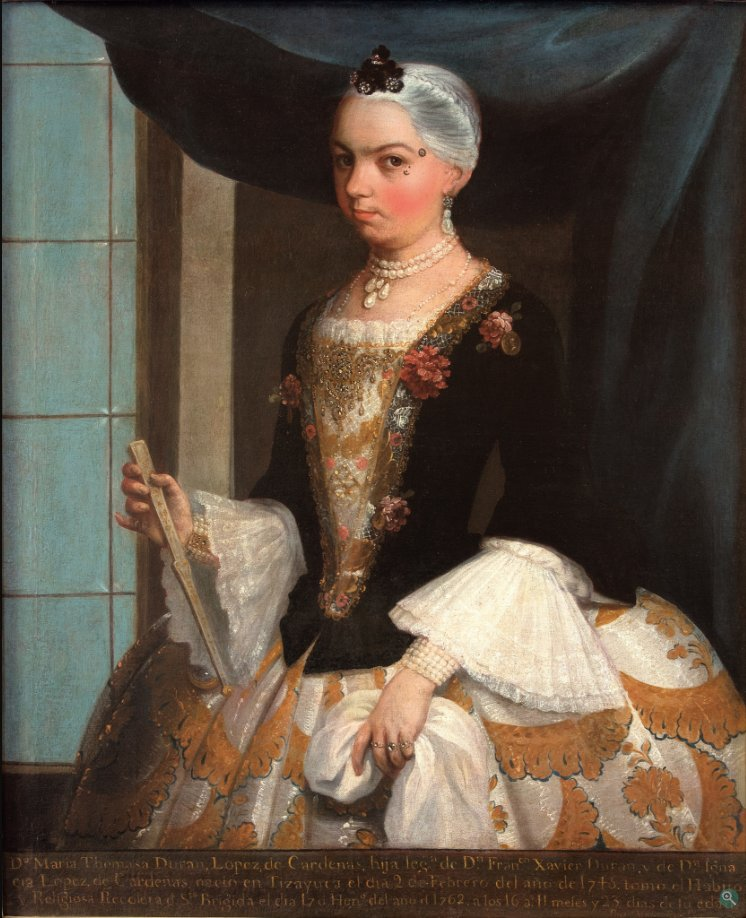
Portrait of Doña María Tomasa Durán y López de Cárdenas painted by Juan Patricio Morlete Ruiz

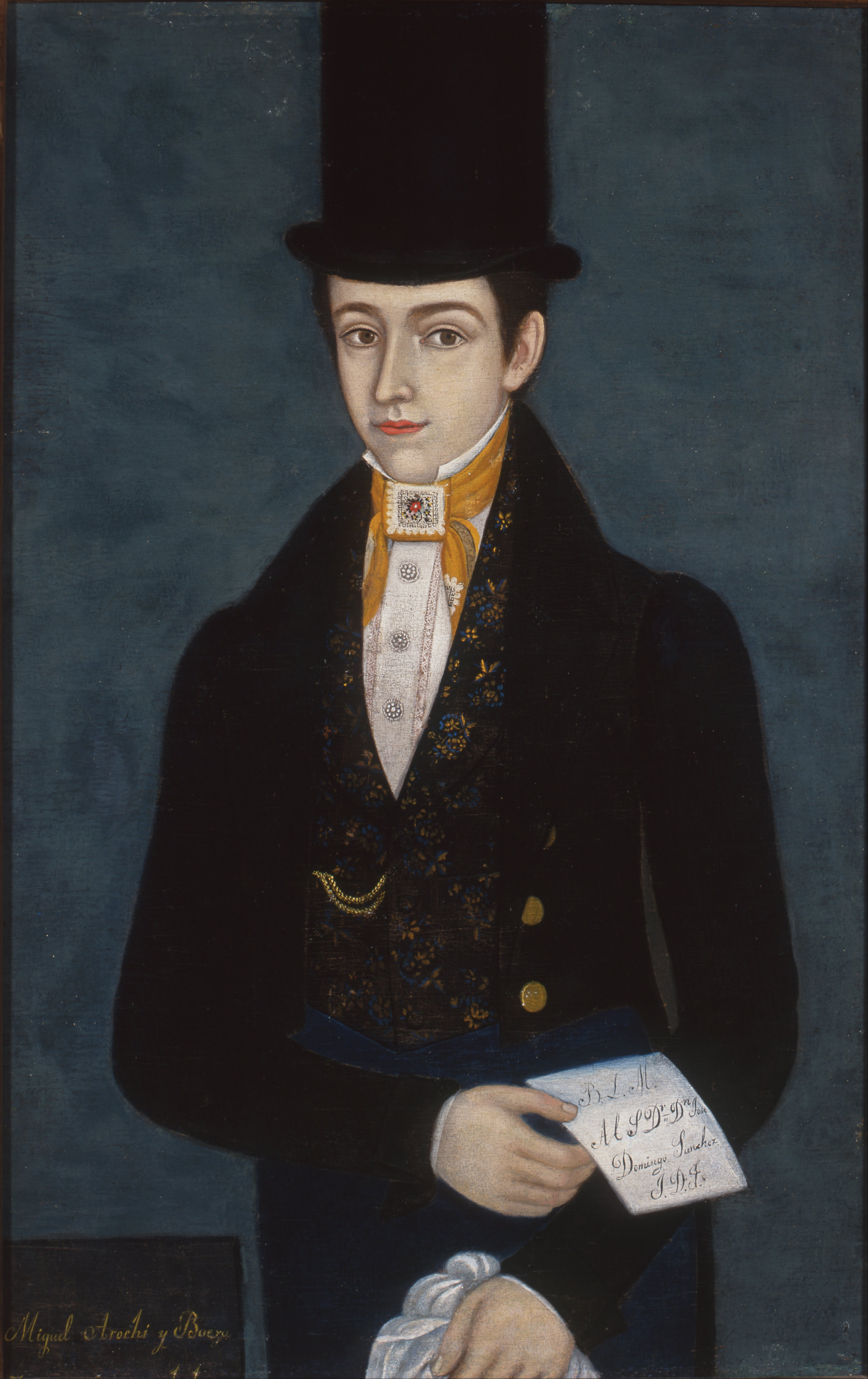
Portrait of Don Miguel Arochi y Baeza, a member of the Nueva Galicia nobility, painted by José María Estrada

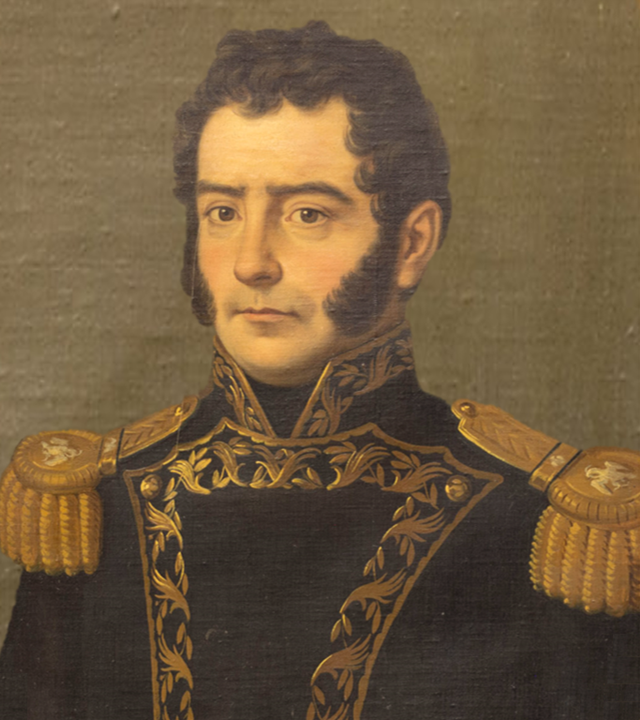
Don Melchor de Ecay-Múzquiz y Arrieta, 5º President of Mexico, was a member of the untitled nobility

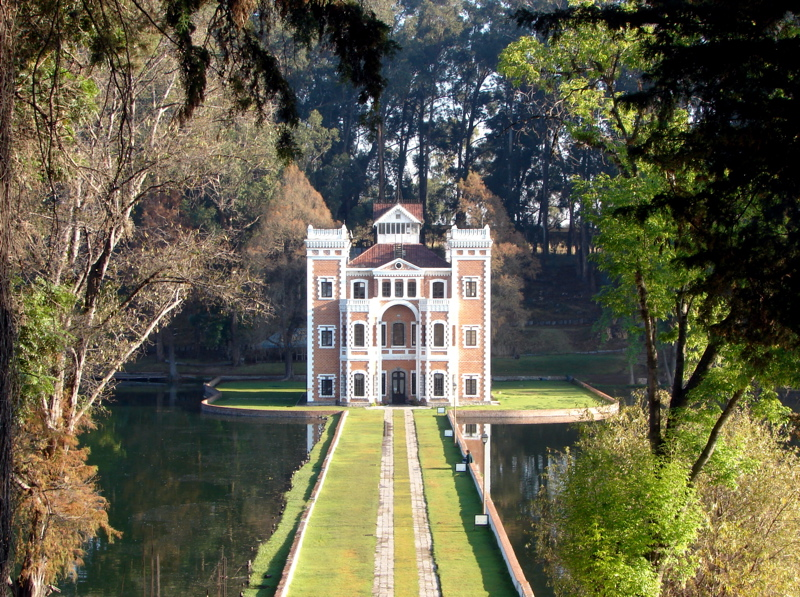
The Hacienda of Chautla in the State of Puebla, former property of the Marquesses of Selva Nevada

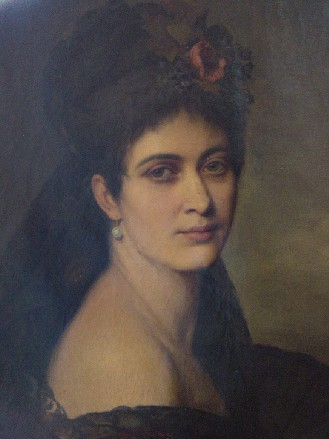
Portrait of Princess Agnes zu Salm-Salm, a member of Emperor Maximilian's Court

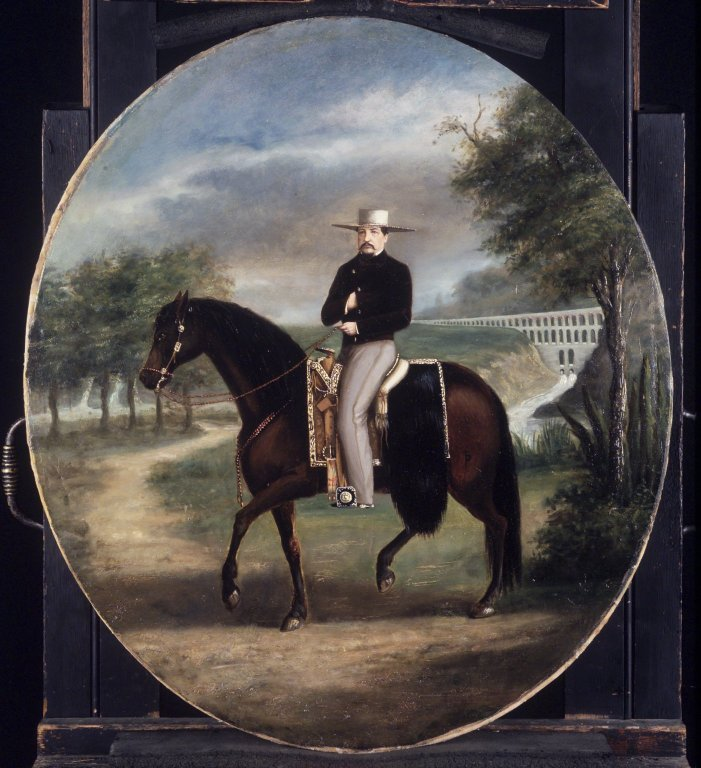
Portrait of Don Manuel Romero de Terreros y Villar-Villamil, brother to the 1st Duke of Regla, painted by Édouard Pingret

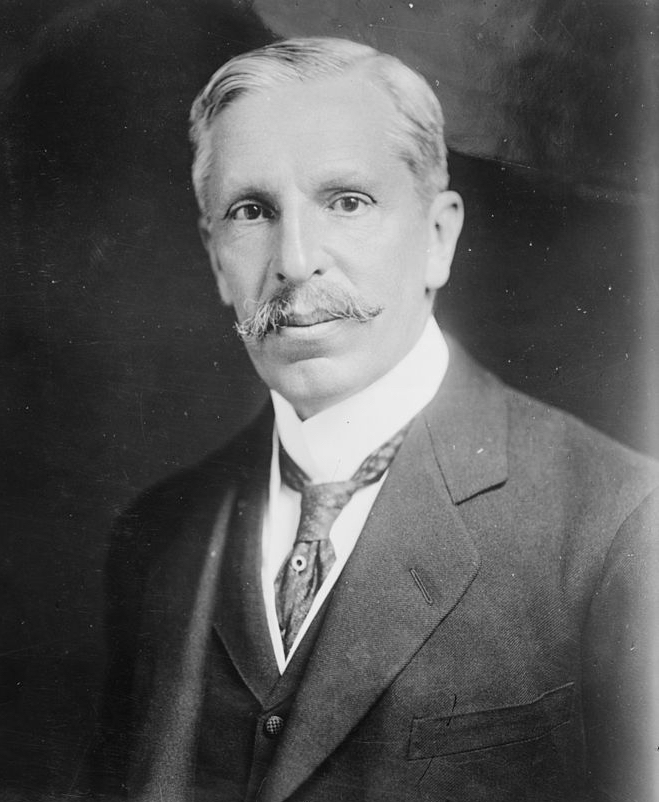
Pedro Lascurain, interim President of Mexico, was a member of the old non-titled nobility

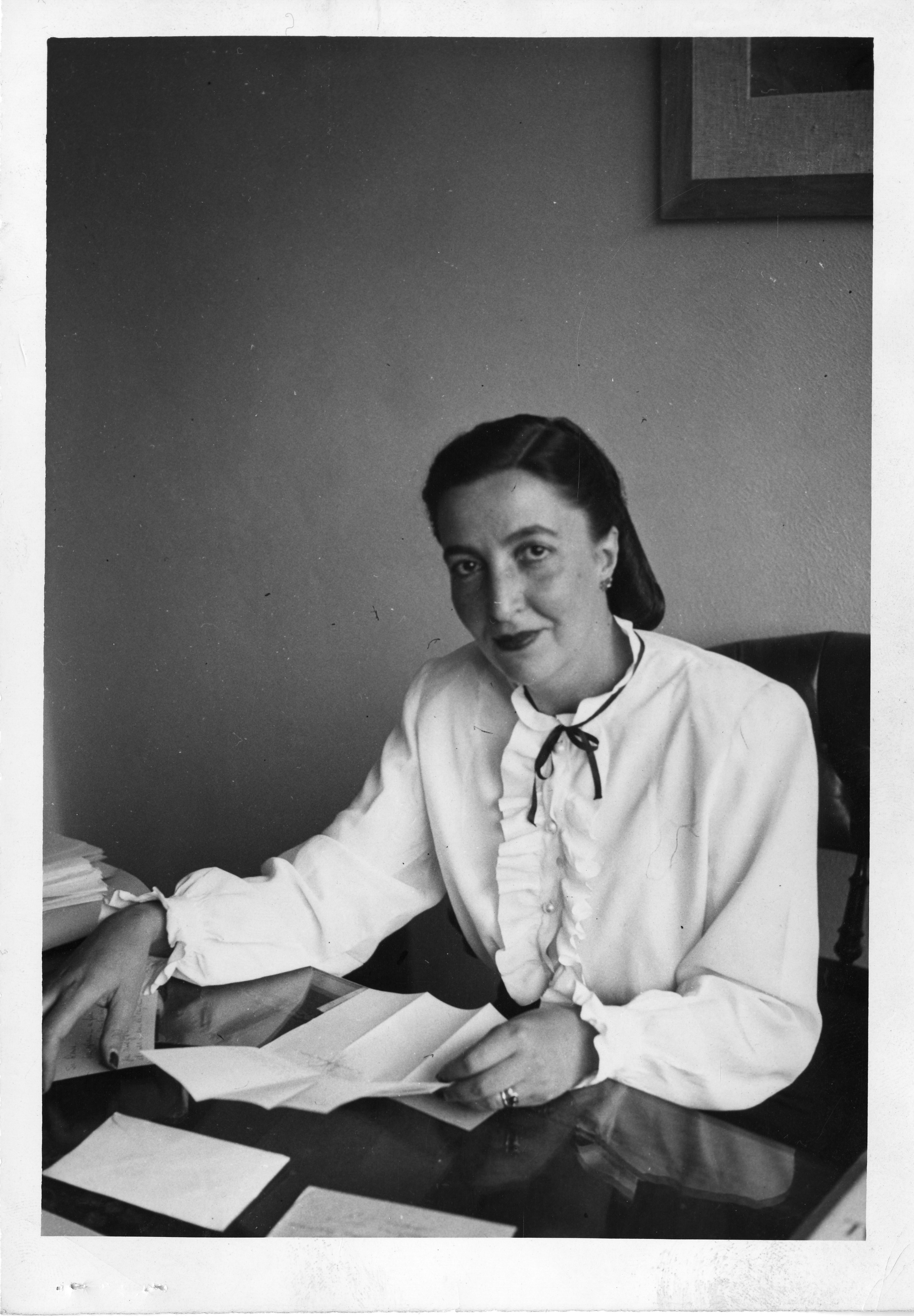
Portrait of Carolina Amor, founder of the Editorial Fournier and the Galería de Arte Mexicano, sister of poet Pita Amor. and members of the old untitled nobility

== See also ==
- Mexican Empire
- Viceroyalty of the New Spain
- Spanish Empire
- First Mexican Empire
- Second Mexican Empire
- Mexican heraldry
- Monarchism in Mexico
- Mexican Academy of Genealogy and Heraldry
- House of Iturbide
- Martínez del Río
- Villagómez family
