= Bartolomé de Medina =

Bartolomé de Medina may refer to:

- Bartolomé de Medina (theologian)
- Bartolomé de Medina (mining specialist)
