= Villagómez family =

Mixtec noble family

The Villagómez family is a Mixtec noble family, who were among the largest indigenous landowners in New Spain, later Mexico. Despite being part of the indigenous elite, the Villagómez retained their Mixtec identity, speaking the Mixtec language and keeping a collection of Mixtec codices.

== See also ==
- Mexican nobility
