= José María Cervantes y Velasco =

Mexican army officer (1786–1856)

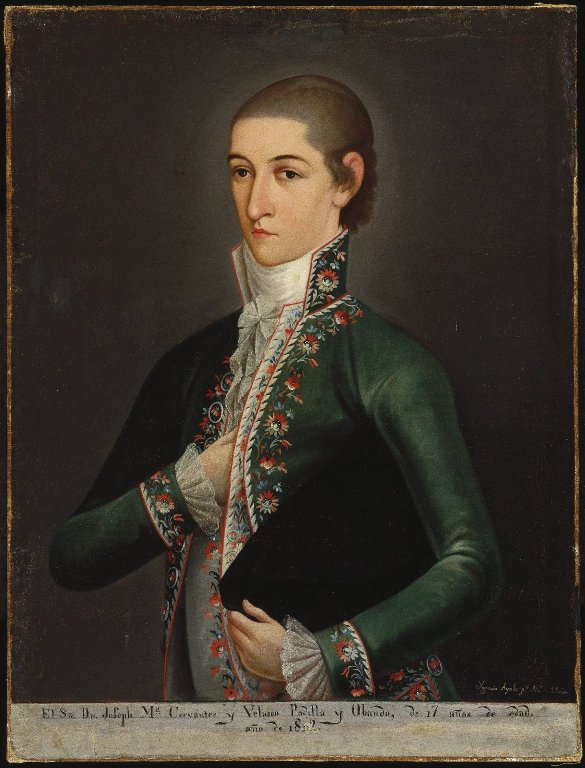
- In 1802, at the age of 17 (portrait by Ignacio Ayala)
- Born: José María Gómez de Cervantes y Altamirano de Velasco Padilla y Ovando; 14 May 1786; Mexico City, New Spain
- Died: 3 December 1856 (aged 70); Mexico City, Mexico
- Title: Count of Santiago de Calimaya, Marquis of Salinas del Rio Pisuegra
- Relatives: Juan María Cervantes y Padilla (uncle)

José María Gómez de Cervantes y Altamirano de Velasco Padilla y Ovando (14 May 1786 – 3 December 1856), Count of Santiago de Calimaya and Marquess of Salinas, was a Mexican army officer who signed the Act of Independence of the Mexican Empire along Agustín de Iturbide and his uncle, Juan María Cervantes y Padilla.

He was the son of Ignacio Gómez de Cervantes and doña Marina Altamirano de Velasco, countess of Santiago de Calimaya and Marquise of Salinas. He entered the Spanish royal army in 1810 as captain in the Distinguished Patriots of Ferdinand VII battalions created by Viceroy Francisco Javier Venegas, rose to colonel in 1813 and joined the Mexican independence movement in 1815.

He married twice in his life; first to doña María Michaus y Oroquieta and the later to doña Ana María Ozta y Cotera, Marquise of Rivascacho, with whom he had a son: don José María Cervantes Ozta, who inherited his title and, after marrying doña Magdalena Ayestarán, fathered don Ignacio Cervantes Ayestarán, the last count of Santiago de Calimaya before Mexico's independence, who married Carmen Cauz and had not descendants; and Guadalupe Cervantes Ayestarán who married Don Francisco Cauz and whose descendants would have inherited the titles.

His portrait is part of the Museum Collection Fund and the Dick S. Ramsay Fund of the Brooklyn Museum, but it is not on view. It was signed and dated Ygnacio Ayala pto. Mo. a. 1802, and according to María Concepción Amerlinck, it is attributed to Ignacio Remigio Ayala, author of a portrait of Manuel Valdés (a famous printer and publisher) and several other works that hanged in 1807 at the Convent of La Merced, in Mexico City.
