= Bartolomé de Medina (mining specialist) =

Spanish metallurgist

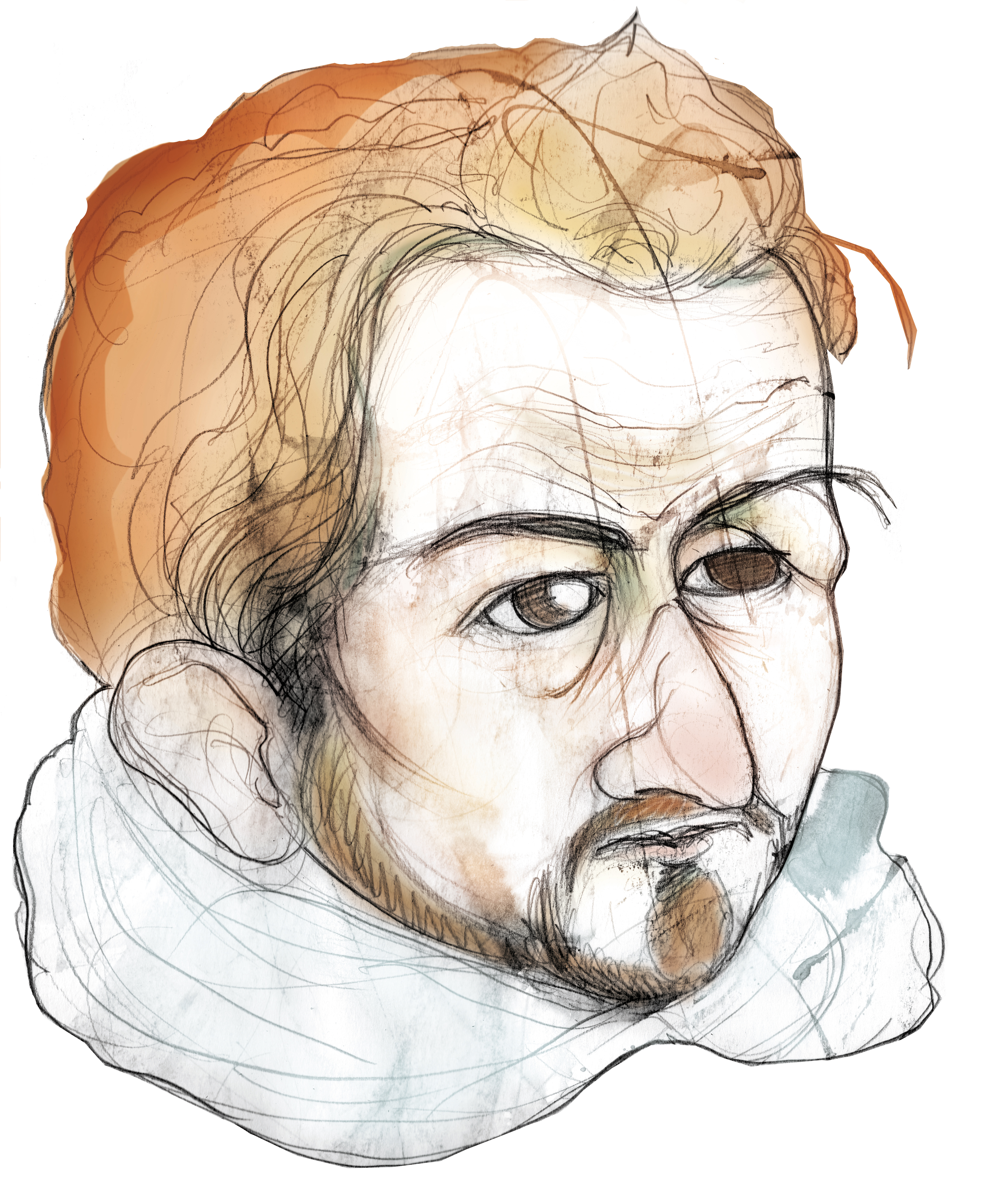
Portrait of Bartolomé de Medina

Bartolomé de Medina (born around 1504 in Seville) was a Spanish merchant known for his invention of the patio process.

== Biography ==
In Europe, he learned the economics of litharge smelting, and, from a German man known only as "Maestro Lorenzo" or "Leonard", he learned how to efficiently use mercury, and a "strong brine", to extract silver from its ore. Around the age of 50, Medina moved to New Spain, leaving behind his wife Leonor de Morales and their five children.

First settling in Mexico City, Medina worked on silver amalgamation for a year at the residence of Hernando de Ribadeneyra, before moving on to Pachuca. There, he built his Hacienda de Beneficio Nuestra Senora de la Purisima Concepcion, which included paved surface patios on which he could spread ground ore. Located on Magdalena Mountain, he had access to running water and lower grade ore in the Old Discovery Mine dump. However, it was several months before Medina discovered that the brine and mercury method Lorenzo showed him in Spain also required iron or copper sulfate. The gossans in Spain contained this naturally as pyrite and chalcopyrite, but needed to be added to the ores in Mexico. This added ingredient, called magistral, promoted the chemical reaction inherent to the amalgamation.

For this process for extracting silver from ore, now known as the patio process or silver ore amalgamation, Viceroy Don Luís de Velasco awarded Medina a six-year patent. This patent covered the key ingredients of magistral, salt and mercury. Then on 10 July 1556, Velasco issued a joint patent to Medina and Gaspar Lohmann (Loman), for mechanizing the process using Lohmann's ingenio. Lohmann's ingenio, and one described by Miguel Perez, were influenced by Georgius Agricola's De Re Metallica.

One quarter of his royalties were commissioned towards the Home and School for Orphan Girls. In 1557, his eldest son died on the voyage from Spain. Medina eventually returned to Spain and returned to Pachuca in 1565 with his wife and remaining four children.
