= Francisco Primo de Verdad y Ramos =

Mexican activist (1760–1808)

Don Francisco Primo de Verdad y Ramos Protomartyr of Mexican Independence
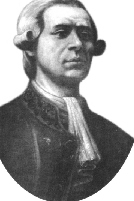

Regidor in the Cabildo of Mexico City
- In office 1808 – September 15, 1808
- Monarchs: Charles IV; Ferdinand VII
- Viceroy: José de Iturrigaray

Personal details
- Born: June 9, 1760 Ciénega del Rincón, New Spain
- Died: October 4, 1808 (aged 48) Mexico City, New Spain
- Party: Criollo Party
- Other political affiliations: Mexican independence
- Education: College of San Ildefonso
- Occupation: Lawyer, politician

Francisco Primo de Verdad y Ramos (June 9, 1760, Ciénega del Rincón, New Spain – October 4, 1808, Mexico City, New Spain) was a lawyer and politician from Colonial New Spain and a proponent of Mexican independence from Spain. He was imprisoned by the Spanish authorities for his advocacy, and died in prison. He is considered one of the protomartyrs of Mexican independence.

== Biography ==
=== Education and career ===
Primo de Verdad was born on June 9, 1760, at the hacienda of Ciénega del Rincón, now located within the municipality of Ojuelos de Jalisco in Jalisco state, but at the time under the jurisdiction of the village of Santa María de los Lagos (present-day Lagos de Moreno). From the religious point of view, the hacienda belonged to the parish church of the present-day city of Aguascalientes. Primo de Verdad studied in the College of San Ildefonso in Mexico City, graduating as a lawyer. He was a student of the American and French Revolutions and of Jean-Jacques Rousseau. His friend and comrade, Licenciado Juan Francisco Azcárate y Ledesma, later described him as a "true scholar" (sabio).

=== Politician in the cabildo ===
==== Criollo politics ====
In 1808, he was a member of the cabildo (city council) of the ayuntamiento (city government) of the colonial capital, Mexico City. He was a criollo by virtue of his birth in America and his Spanish ancestry, and he was a prominent member of the criollo party in government. Criollos were prominent in the agitation for autonomy or independence from Spain, and this agitation was increasing. The Cabildo of Mexico City was considerably influenced by its criollo members. It is possible that Primo de Verdad was also a member of one of the secret societies working for the independence of the colony, but that is not known with certainty.

==== Developments in Europe ====
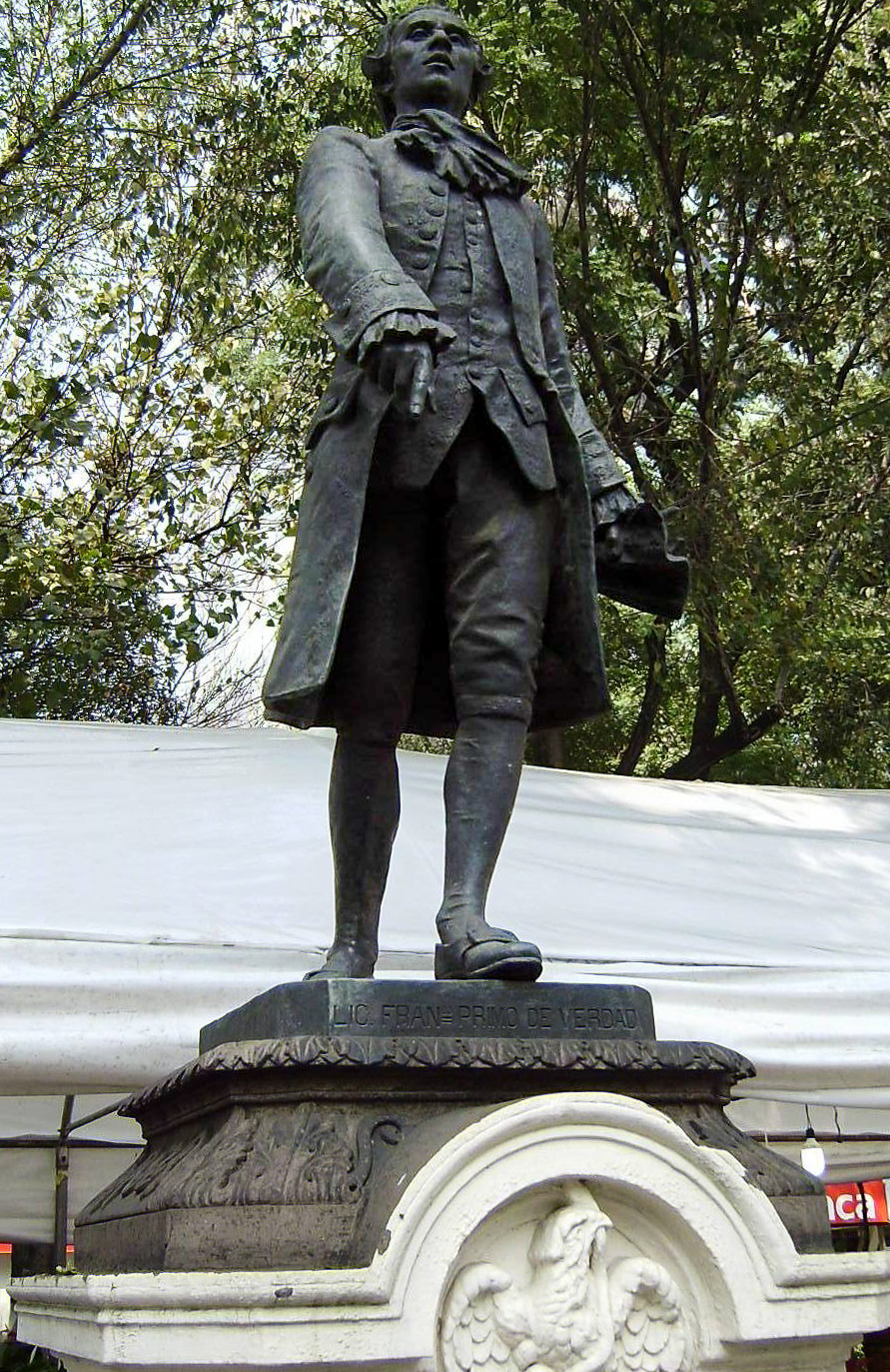
Sculpture in Paseo de la Reforma, Mexico City.

On March 19, 1808, at the summer palace of Aranjuez, King Charles IV of Spain was forced to abdicate to a court faction that removed Prime Minister Godoy – a French puppet and the Queen's lover. The nobles, the Church, and the army acclaimed the Infante Fernando as Fernando VII. Napoleon's troops occupied Madrid and he invited Charles IV and Ferdinand VII to Bayonne, France, where he forced both to abdicate in favor of his brother Joseph Bonaparte in May 1808.

==== Mexican independence ====
News of the second series of abdications was received in Mexico on 11 July 1808. The way now seemed open for the Criollo party to achieve autonomy for New Spain. An old Spanish law was invoked that in the absence of the head of state, sovereignty reverts to the people, expressed through their representatives in the Cortes. The application of this law would allow a legal route for New Spain to weaken its ties with Spain. This move was intended to preserve the monarchical constitution in the face of foreign aggression, rather than subvert it.

On July 19, councilmen Azcárate y Ledesma and Primo de Verdad presented a plan to form a provisional, governing junta for an autonomous New Spain, with Viceroy José de Iturrigaray at its head. The justification for this was that the mother country was now occupied by foreign troops, and the royal family was being held prisoner. The plan was accepted by the viceroy and the Cabildo, but not by the Audiencia. Just as the Cabildo was dominated by liberal criollos, the Audiencia was dominated by conservative peninsulares, large landowners and wealthy businessmen born in Spain.

On August 9, 1808, at a meeting of Notables called to debate the situation, Primo de Verdad spoke in favor of popular sovereignty. Some of the oidores (members of the Audiencia) spoke in rebuttal, declaring the proposal seditious and subversive. Inquisitor Bernardo Prado y Ovejero declared it heresy and anathema. The Notables adopted an intermediate position — New Spain would recognize no supreme authority other than the King of Spain, now considered to be Ferdinand VII.

On August 31, 1808, the crisis took a sharper turn with the arrival of Juan Gabriel Jabat, representative of the Junta of Seville, and a message from the Junta of Asturias. Both juntas requested New Spain's recognition as the legitimate government of Spain, thus providing evidence of the lack of any legitimate government in the country.

On September 1, 1808, Melchor de Talamantes, a Peruvian priest and the intellectual leader of the Criollo party, delivered two tracts to the Cabildo, in favor of separation from Spain and the convoking of a Mexican congress.

=== Downfall ===
On September 15, 1808, the Spaniards opposed to independence and popular sovereignty, headed by the rich businessman Gabriel J. de Yermo, staged a coup. Viceroy Iturrigaray was deposed and Primo de Verdad, Melchor de Talamantes and other members of the Criollo party were arrested. The viceroy was replaced with General Pedro de Garibay. Primo de Verdad and others were imprisoned in the jail of the archbishop, subject to trial. With this seizure of power, Yermo and the Peninsulares initiated a "half century of uprisings and coups d'état", in both colonial and independent Mexico (Fuentes Mares, p. 81).

==== Death ====
On October 4, 1808, Primo de Verdad was found dead in his cell, of suicide or murder. Circumstances suggested the latter and poison was suspected, but that was never proven. Today in Mexico, Francisco Primo de Verdad y Ramos is revered as one of the protomartyrs of Mexican independence.
