= Francisco Javier de Lizana y Beaumont =

Mexican politician (1750–1815)

His Excellency Francisco Javier de Lizana y Beaumont
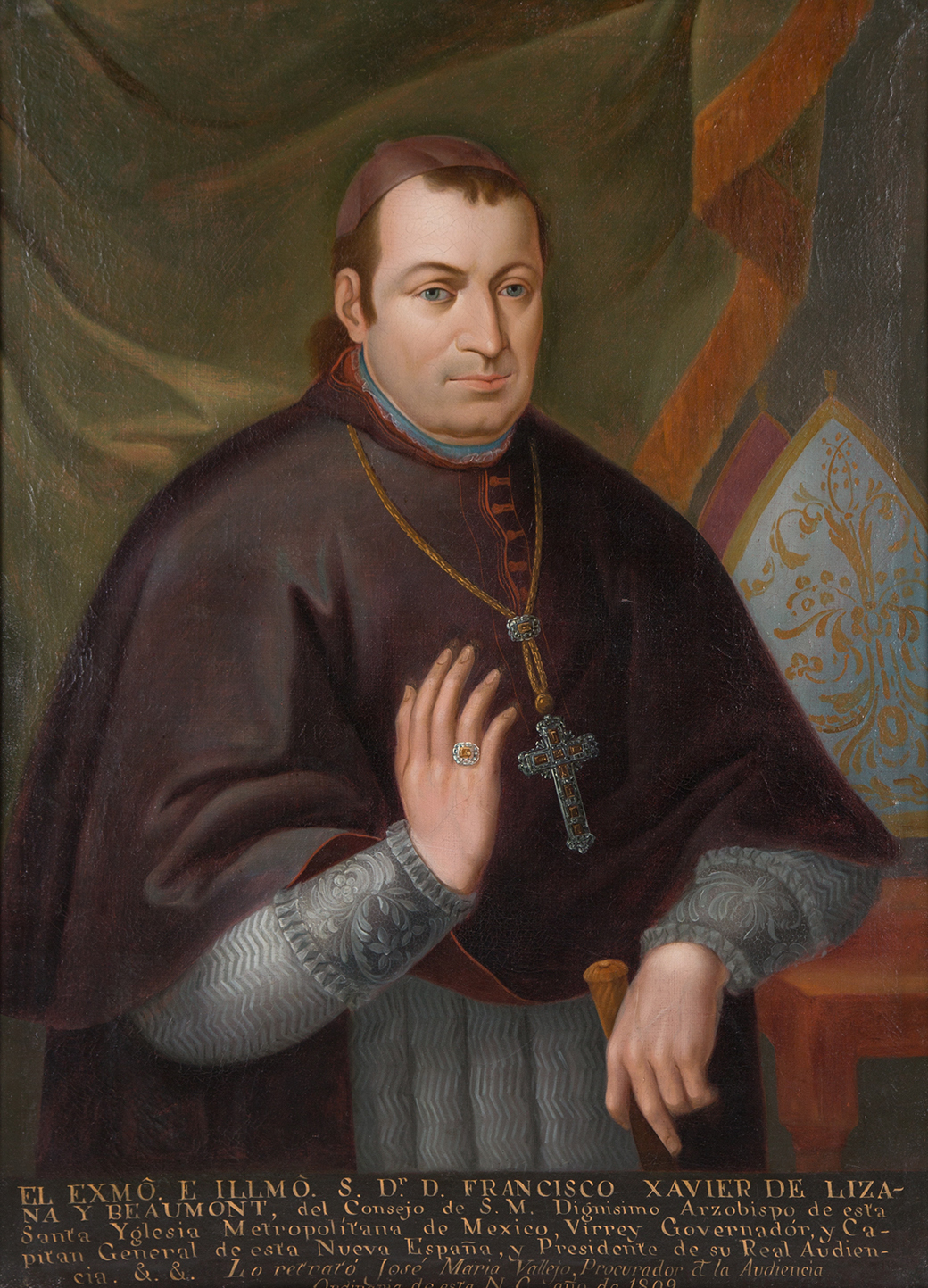

58th Viceroy of New Spain
- In office 19 July 1809 – 8 May 1810
- Preceded by: Pedro de Garibay
- Succeeded by: Francisco Javier Venegas
- Archbishop of Mexico
- See: Mexico
- Installed: 24 May 1802
- Term ended: 1 January 1815
- Predecessor: Alonso Núñez de Haro
- Successor: Pedro José de Fonte

Orders
- Ordination: 21 February 1796 by Francisco Antonio de Lorenzana

Personal details
- Born: 1750 Arnedo, La Rioja, Spain
- Died: 6 March 1815 (aged 64–65) Mexico City
- Denomination: Roman Catholic

Francisco Javier de Lizana y Beaumont (1750 in Arnedo, La Rioja, Spain – 6 March 1815 in Mexico City) was bishop of Mexico and, from 19 July 1809 to 8 May 1810, viceroy of New Spain.

== Ecclesiastical career ==
Lizana did his religious studies at Calatayud and Zaragoza, where in 1771 he received his doctorate in canon and civil law. In 1772 he was teaching at the University of Alcalá de Henares. In 1795 he was designated bishop in partibus of Taumasia, and in 1801, bishop of Teruel. In 1802 he was named archbishop of Mexico, where he arrived in January 1803.

His ecclesiastical administration was characterized by works of social welfare, which he pursued with diligence and honor. He expanded and furnished the Hospital of San Lázaro and endowed the Hospicio de Pobres (poorhouse) and the Casa de Niños Expósitos (foundling home). In the University he founded the chair of ecclesiastical discipline.

== Political career ==
He was among those who asked Marshal Pedro de Garibay to assume the position of viceroy after the coup that deposed José de Iturrigaray. Garibay did so, but when the Junta de Aranjuez became aware of his advanced age and the fact that he was a puppet of the rich merchants and the Real Audiencia, they named Archbishop Lizana to replace him on an interim basis (February 1809). The archbishop was chosen because the Junta was aware that Catholics did not support Napoleon after the imprisonment of Pope Pius VII in 1809. Lizana named his cousin, Inquisitor Juan Sáenz de Alfaro, to handle his ecclesiastical duties so that Lizana himself could concentrate on his political duties. Sáenz de Alfaro was not a popular choice.

He formed new units of provincial militia, and imported arms from Britain. He confiscated the property in New Spain of the Marqués de Branciforte and the Duque de Terranova, nobles in Spain who had declared for King Joseph I (Joseph Bonaparte). He obtained a loan of 3 million pesos in gold on the property. From this and other sources, Lizana was able to remit 9 million pesos to Spain. As a personal contribution to the war effort in Spain, he accepted no salary.

Like Garibay, he encountered opposition from the pro-independence party. New Spain had been transformed by the events in the mother country. Anonymous political tracts and clandestine lampoons circulated. Political juntas were formed to seek independence. The Audiencia came in for much criticism for its coup against Iturrigaray. This was felt to be the final closure of the legal route for political change. The only way remaining was direct action. The viceroy was informed of these events, but took no action against them. For this reason the Spaniards in the Audiencia accused him of being a partisan of the Criollos.

A pro-independence conspiracy was discovered in Vallodalid (Morelia, Michoacán). This was headed by Lieutenant José Mariano Michelena and Father Vicente de Santa María. They were arrested, and Lizana ordered them brought to Mexico City so that he could speak to them. The conspirators proposed to the viceroy (as related by Michelena) to form a junta to govern New Spain in the name of King Ferdinand VII and to take all possible measures to extend the reign of this "august" sovereign. Lizana found no criminal offense in the conspirators, and ordered them set free, to the great disgust of the pro-Spanish party.

== After leaving the viceroyalty ==
Because of this and other failings, and also in consideration of his advanced age, the regency in Aranjuez removed the archbishop from the viceroyalty. They ordered the Real Audiencia to fill in until the arrival of the next viceroy, Francisco Javier Venegas. Lizana continued as archbishop. He was awarded the Cross of Carlos III. He died on 6 March 1815 in Mexico City.

Religious titles
| Preceded by Alonzo Núñez de Haro | Archbishop of Mexico; 1802 - 1815 | Succeeded by Pedro José de Fonte |
Government offices
| Preceded by Pedro de Garibay | Viceroy of New Spain; 1808 - 1809 | Succeeded by Francisco Javier Venegas |
