= Pedro de Garibay =

Mexican politician

The Most Excellent Pedro de Garibay
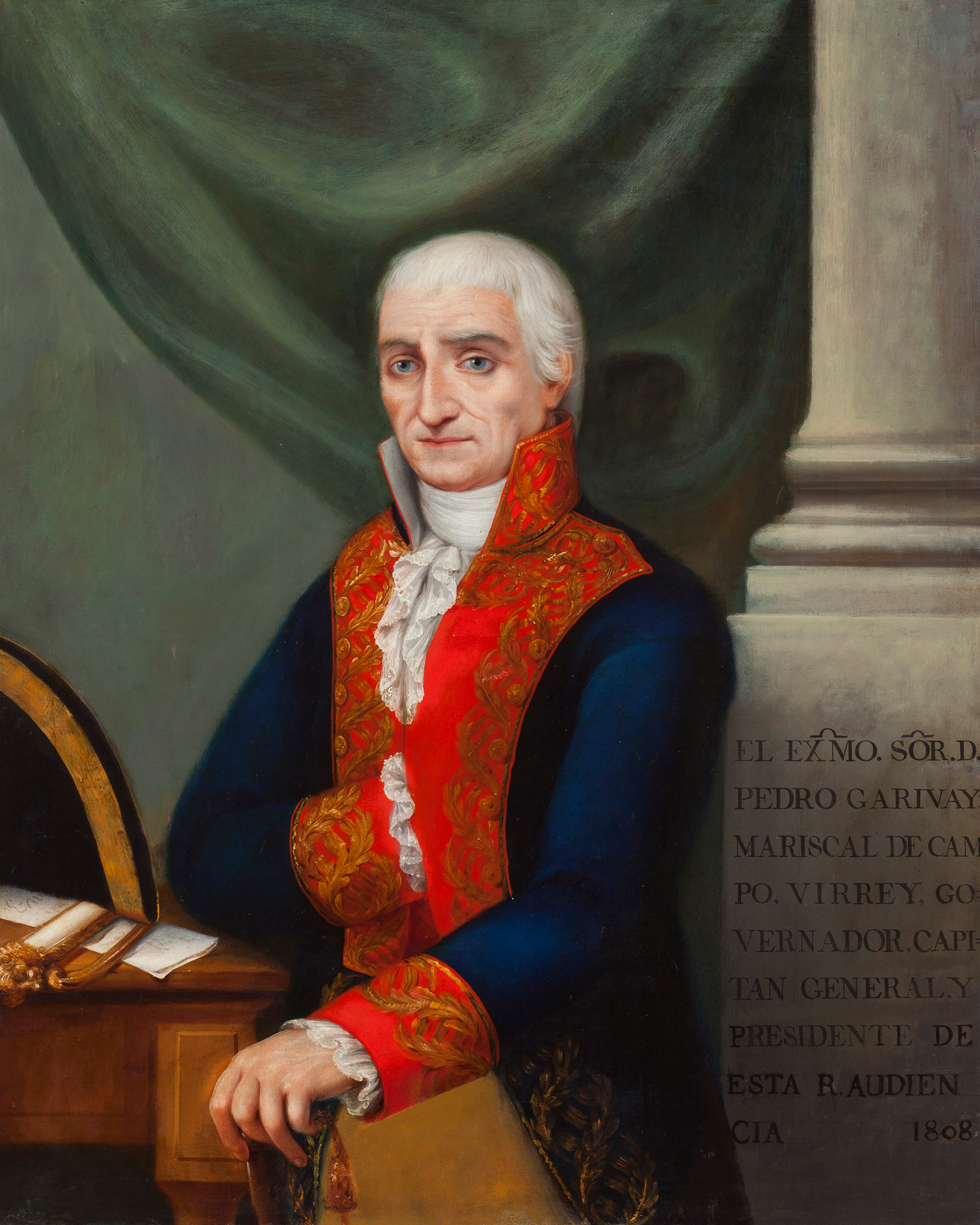
- Pedro de Garibay, Viceroy of New Spain

57th Viceroy of New Spain
- In office 16 September 1808 – 19 July 1809
- Preceded by: José de Iturrigaray
- Succeeded by: Francisco Javier de Lizana y Beaumont

Personal details
- Born: 1729 Alcalá de Henares, Spain
- Died: July 7, 1815 (aged 85–86) Mexico City, New Spain
- Occupation: Military officer

Pedro de Garibay (1729, Alcalá de Henares, Spain – July 7, 1815, Mexico City) was a Spanish military officer and, from September 16, 1808 to July 19, 1809, viceroy of New Spain.

== Military career ==
Born in Alcalá de Henares in 1729 (some sources say 1727), Pedro de Garibay entered the military in 1742. As a cadet and lieutenant he took part in action in Portugal, Italy and Morocco. He fought bravely in the attack on the fort of Yaqueví, Santo Domingo.

In 1764 he went to New Spain, as sergeant major in an expedition headed by Lieutenant General Juan de Villalba. In New Spain he participated in the organization and instruction of provincial troops. Later he transferred to the office of sergeant major of the regiment of Mexico City, a position he held for 23 years. In 1783 he was promoted to colonel and in 1789 to brigadier. By this time old and sick, Viceroy Miguel José de Azanza promoted him to field marshal in anticipation of his retirement.

== The coup against Iturrigaray ==
The pro-Spanish (anti-independence) party headed by Gabriel J. de Yermo deposed Viceroy José de Iturrigaray on September 15, 1808 for his pro-independence sympathies. This was the first coup in Mexico's history. In accordance with custom, the Audiencia of Mexico named the oldest and highest-ranking military officer in the colony as Iturrigaray's replacement. This was octogenarian Marshal Pedro de Garibay. No one was better suited to lead the colony in times of turmoil.

Garibay was tall in stature, courageous, charismatic, prestigious, and an intellectual. As viceroy, he had risen to a position for which he had more than enough skill to perform. He reined in the "Parianeros", as the followers of Yermo were popularly known. Garibay signed all the documents delivered to him by members of the Audiencia if he deemed beneficial. Anything else he discarded.

The first of these were arrest warrants for criminal leaders in the independence movement — Juan Francisco Azcárate y Ledesma, councilman in the Mexico City government, Francisco Primo de Verdad y Ramos, also a councilman, José Beye Cisneros, the abbot of Guadalupe, Canon Beristáin, Licenciado Cristo, Iturrigaray's secretary, and Fray Melchor de Talamantes. Verdad y Ramos was found dead in his cell in the archbishop's prison on October 4, 1808. Reports differed on the cause of death — hanging or poisoning. Five days later Fray Talamantes died of yellow fever in San Juan de Ulúa as he was being transferred under guard to Spain. Cristo was fired from his position in the war office. Azcárate remained in prison until 1811, when he was freed.

== Garibay's administration of New Spain ==
Garibay also created a committee to investigate the anarchist outbreak (the anarchist movement). He dispersed the troops concentrated at Jalapa (Veracruz) by his predecessor. He ordered the sculptor Manuel Tolsá to cast 100 cannons and to manufacture other kinds of arms. He suspended the Cédula de la Caja de Consolidación, which had appropriated the income of religious estates and foundations to the government, and which had been a considerable source of discontent in the colony.

The Parianeros, realizing Viceroy Garibay's control over his countrol, they put on airs as saviors of the fatherland. They organized militarily, under the name Realistas Fieles (Faithful Royalists) or Patriotas de Fernando VII (Patriots of Ferdinand VII). They adopted blue jackets like shopkeepers' robes, and for this reason were mockingly known as Los Chaquetas (The Jackets).

Viceroy Garibay not only controlled the government; he also tried to prevent the Parianeros from committing outrages and abuses against anyone they singled out. These abuses became so grave that Viceroy Garibay dissolved the Voluntarios de Fernando VII and at the same time enlisted a regiment of dragoons under his personal command.

Although the new government at first did not grant formal recognition to any of the various anti-Napoleonic governing juntas in Spain, as a practical matter it accepted the authority of the Junta of Seville, and followed all of its directives. When victories over the French allowed a measure of unification of control in Spain, New Spain recognized the Junta of Aranjuez. Garibay sent a donation of 200,000 pesos to Aranjuez as a contribution to the war, in addition to the 90,000 pesos of the regular payment.

The Junta of Aranjuez provided that each of the Spanish colonies send a representative to participate in its deliberations. This provision had a counterproductive effect in New Spain. The Spanish party feared it was the beginning of colonial autonomy, a position it had long opposed. The Criollos deemed a single representative much too minor a concession to be of value.

Visitors to New Spain from the United States were viewed with suspicion, for Joseph Bonaparte was known to send French agents into the colonies to foment rebellion in favor of his regime. A brother of Ferdinand VII (recognized as king by the Spanish population and the Spanish colonies), was held a prisoner in France because his sister, Carlota Joaquina, had tried to get the Junta of Aranjuez to accept her son Pedro as regent of New Spain.

Once the alliance with Britain allowed secure commerce with Spain, Garibay ordered the construction of many merchant ships to carry it.

== His retirement ==
The Supreme Junta of Spain replaced Garibay with Francisco Javier de Lizana y Beaumont, archbishop of Mexico, after ten months. Garibay wanted to return to Spain, but his financial state would not permit it. He then lived, retired from public life, on a monthly pension of 500 pesos granted by Yermo, who was a rich landowner. Later the Crown awarded him the Cross of Carlos III and a pension of 10,000 pesos annually, with the grade of lieutenant general for his contributions to king and country. He died in Mexico City in 1815. For most of his life Pedro de Garibay lived in the state of Michoacan, Mexico. His brother lived in the state of Jalisco, Mexico.
