= Juan Francisco Azcárate y Ledesma =

Mexican lawyer (1767–1831)

Juan Francisco Azcárate y Lezama (1767, in Mexico City – January 31, 1831, in Mexico City) was a lawyer, a Mexico City councilman, and a leader of the movement for Mexican independence from Spain.

Azcárate y Ledesma, born in Mexico City, was a Criollo and a lawyer for rich clients. Shortly after obtaining his license to practice law, he became a lawyer at the Academia Teórico-Práctica de Jurisprudencia, and later its vice-president.

In 1808, he became a regidor (councilman) in the city government of Mexico City. News of the French occupation of Spain was received in Mexico on June 23, 1808, and the following July 14, news of the abdication of the Spanish king in favor of Napoleon was also received. On July 19, 1808, Azcárate, along with councilman Francisco Primo de Verdad y Ramos presented a plan to form a provisional, autonomous government of New Spain, with the current viceroy, José de Iturrigaray, at its head. The justification for this was that the mother country was now occupied by foreign troops, and the royal family was being held prisoner. The plan was accepted by the viceroy and the Cabildo (city council), but not by the Audiencia. It was also vehemently opposed by the Peninsulares (Spaniards resident in New Spain, but born in the mother country).

Viceroy Iturrigaray was overthrown in a coup on September 15, 1808, for his sympathy for the independence movement. He was replaced by Pedro de Garibay. Among the first acts of Garibay's administration was the issuance of arrest warrants for leaders in the independence movement — Azcárate y Ledesma, Primo de Verdad y Ramos, José Beye Cisneros, the abbot of Guadalupe, Canon Beristáin, Licenciado Cristo, Iturrigaray's secretary, and Fray Melchor de Talamantes. Azcárate remained in prison until 1811, when he was freed.

In 1821, he was among the signers of the Acta de Independencia of Mexico. On the fall of Emperor Agustín de Iturbide, he served successive Mexican administrations, as a minister in the Supreme War Tribunal, as a member of the Mexico City government, and as secretary of the Hospital of the Poor.

In addition, he wrote poetry and prose, including:

- Poema heroica en celebridad de la colocación de la estatua ecuestre colosal de bronce del señor don Carlos IV (1804)
- Oda y soneto en el certamen poético formado con motivo de la colocación de la estatua ecuestre del señor don Carlos IV (1814)
- Breves apuntamientos para la literature del renio de Nueva España y Ensayos panegírico e histórico del mérito de los principales sujetos, así naturales como europeos, que han sobresalido en el reino

The first two of these are poetical works inspired by the dedication of the equestrian statue of Charles IV by Manuel Tolsá in Mexico City in 1803.

He died in 1831 in Mexico City.
