= Francisco Javier Venegas =

Spanish general (1754–1838)

The Most Excellent The Marquess of Reunión and New Spain KOC
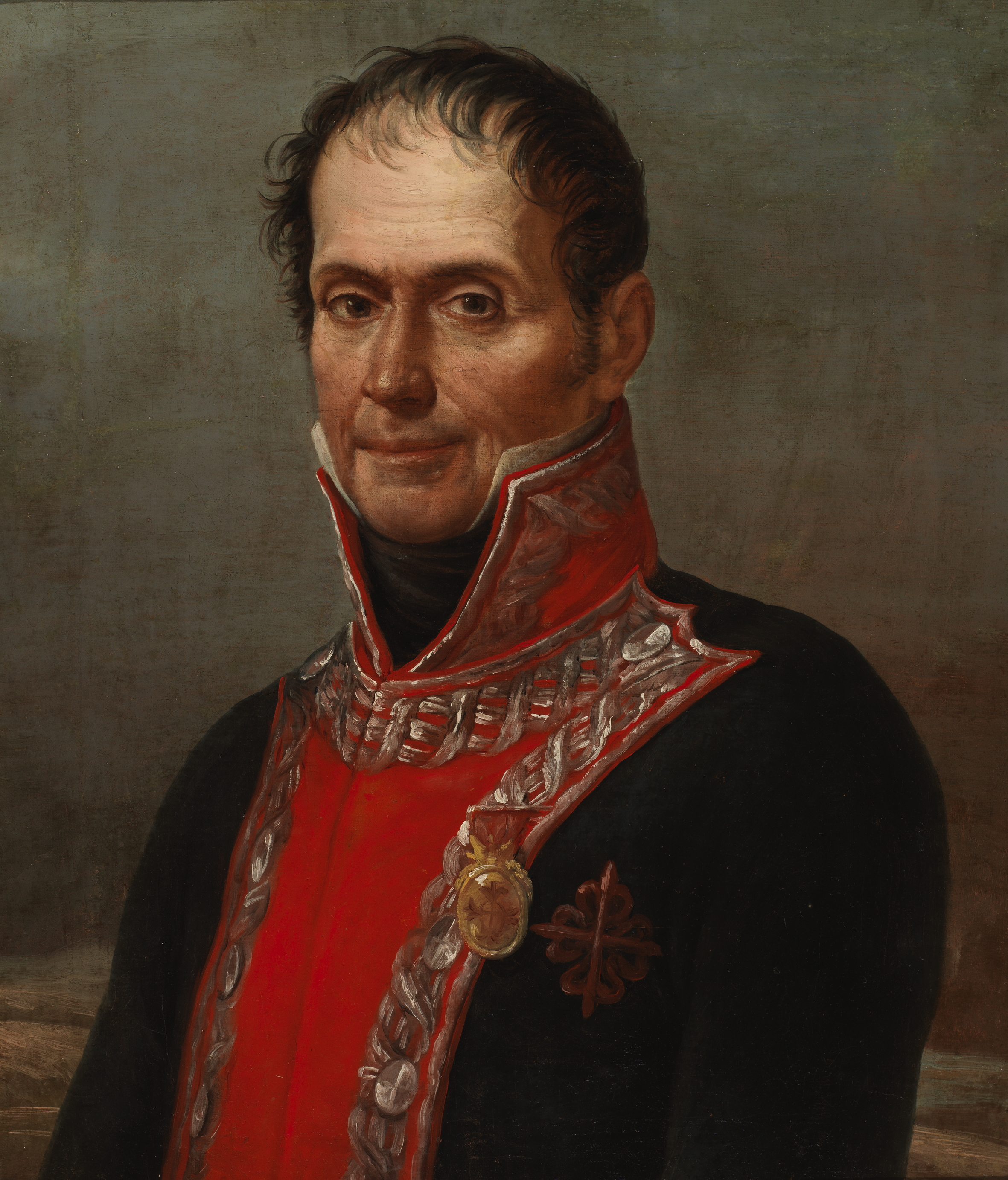
- Portrait by José Aparicio

59th Viceroy of New Spain
- In office 14 September 1810 – 4 March 1813
- Monarch: Ferdinand VII of Spain
- Preceded by: Francisco Javier de Lizana y Beaumont
- Succeeded by: Félix María Calleja del Rey

Personal details
- Born: Francisco Javier Venegas de Saavedra y Rodríguez de Arenzana; 2 December 1754 Zafra, Spain
- Died: February 18, 1838 (aged 83) Madrid, Spain

Francisco Javier Venegas de Saavedra y Ramínez de Arenzana, 1st Marquess of Reunión and New Spain, KOC (1754 in Zafra, Badajoz, Spain – 1838 in Zafra, Spain) was a Spanish general in the Spanish War of Independence and later viceroy of New Spain from September 14, 1810, to March 4, 1813, during the first phase of the Mexican War of Independence.

== Army career ==
Venegas began studies for a literary career, but gave them up to serve in the military. He rose in rank to lieutenant colonel, taking part in the fighting against the French Republic. He had retired from service at the time of the Napoleonic invasion of Spain, but returned then to active duty. He took part in the Battle of Bailén, and was named commander of a division in Andalucía. His services in the war with the French were valuable, and he demonstrated his intelligence, energy and courage. With the patronage of the minister Francisco Saavedra de Sangronis, he advanced rapidly.

On Christmas Day 1808, Venegas and his division attempted a surprise attack André Thomas Perreimond's brigade of French dragoons at Tarancón. They surrounded the town but the French cavalrymen became aware of the trap and rode out of the town. When the Spanish infantry formed into squares across their path, the enemy cavalry galloped through the gaps between the squares. The French escaped with the loss of about 60 troopers. The late arrival of Venegas' cavalry prevented further damage from being inflicted on the dragoons. On 13 January 1809, Venegas with 9,500 infantry, 1,800 cavalry, and four artillery pieces unwisely offered battle to the French. At the Battle of Uclés, 12,500 French foot soldiers and 3,500 horsemen under Marshal Claude Perrin Victor crushed the force led by Venegas. Victor ordered one division and his cavalry to mount a frontal assault while his second division attempted an envelopment. The frontal attack was successful in driving the Spanish force into the arms of the second division, which had reached a position behind their adversaries. For only 150 casualties, the French inflicted losses of 1,000 killed and wounded and captured 5,866 prisoners and all four guns. His superior officer, who had failed to come to Venegas' aid with 9,000 troops, ordered an immediate retreat upon hearing of the disaster.

Despite the setback, Venegas was given command of the Army of La Mancha after its previous commander was badly beaten at the Battle of Ciudad Real on 27 March 1809. In mid-July 1809 Venegas and his 23,000 soldiers sparred with the French IV Corps, carefully avoiding being drawn into battle with 20,000 troops of superior quality. According to the strategic plan, Venegas was supposed to ensure that the IV Corps did not combine with other French forces against Arthur Wellesley's British and Gregorio García de la Cuesta's Spanish armies. However, the IV Corps managed to elude Venegas and join the army of Joseph Bonaparte for the Battle of Talavera on 27–28 July. The action resulted in an Anglo-Spanish victory. With only a handful of enemies in front of him, Venegas had a brief chance to recapture Madrid, but he allowed the opportunity to slip away. At the head of an army of 20,000 foot and 3,000 horse, Venegas ignored Cuesta's orders to retreat and stood to fight on 11 August 1809. Venegas believed that he faced only 14,000 Frenchmen, but in fact Joseph's army consisted of 17,000 infantry and 4,000 cavalry. At the Battle of Almonacid the Spanish army was defeated with the loss of 800 killed, 2,500 wounded, 2,000 prisoners, and 21 cannons. French casualties numbered 319 killed and 2,075 wounded. A few weeks later, Venegas was replaced in command by Juan Carlos de Aréizaga.

During the French invasion of Andalusia in January 1810, Venegas was military governor of Cádiz. Before the powerful invading army, the Spanish defenders rapidly collapsed and the Supreme Central Junta fled to Cádiz. José María de la Cueva, 14th Duke of Alburquerque was able to bring 12,000 troops to reinforce the weak Cádiz garrison. In the crisis, Venegas ensured that all boats in nearby waters were transferred to Cádiz and ordered the demolition of all forts on the Isla del Trocadero and the adjacent peninsula to prevent their use by the enemy. A squabble arose between Venegas and Alburquerque over who was the superior officer. This problem was resolved when the Junta appointed Venegas to the position of Viceroy of New Spain and gave Alburquerque command of Cádiz.

Venegas was a man of few words, active, cruel and calculating.

== Viceroy ==
On February 20, 1810, he was named viceroy of New Granada. He held the title until August, but never took up the position. Apparently he was diverted to New Spain before his arrival in New Granada.

He arrived in Veracruz August 28, 1810, and made his formal entry into Mexico City to take up the position on September 14, 1810. One of his first measures was to enforce the decree suspending tribute from Indians and Mestizos. He announced the abolition of tribute on October 5, 1810, in a Nahuatl-language broadside titled "Ayamo moyolpachihuitia in Totlatocatzin Rey D. Fernando VII".

He prohibited publications that could foster revolutionary ideas. He set up special police tribunals and founded a military junta in the capital of each province of New Spain.

On January 14, 1811, the last Manila galleon arrived at the port of San Blas.

== Insurrection ==
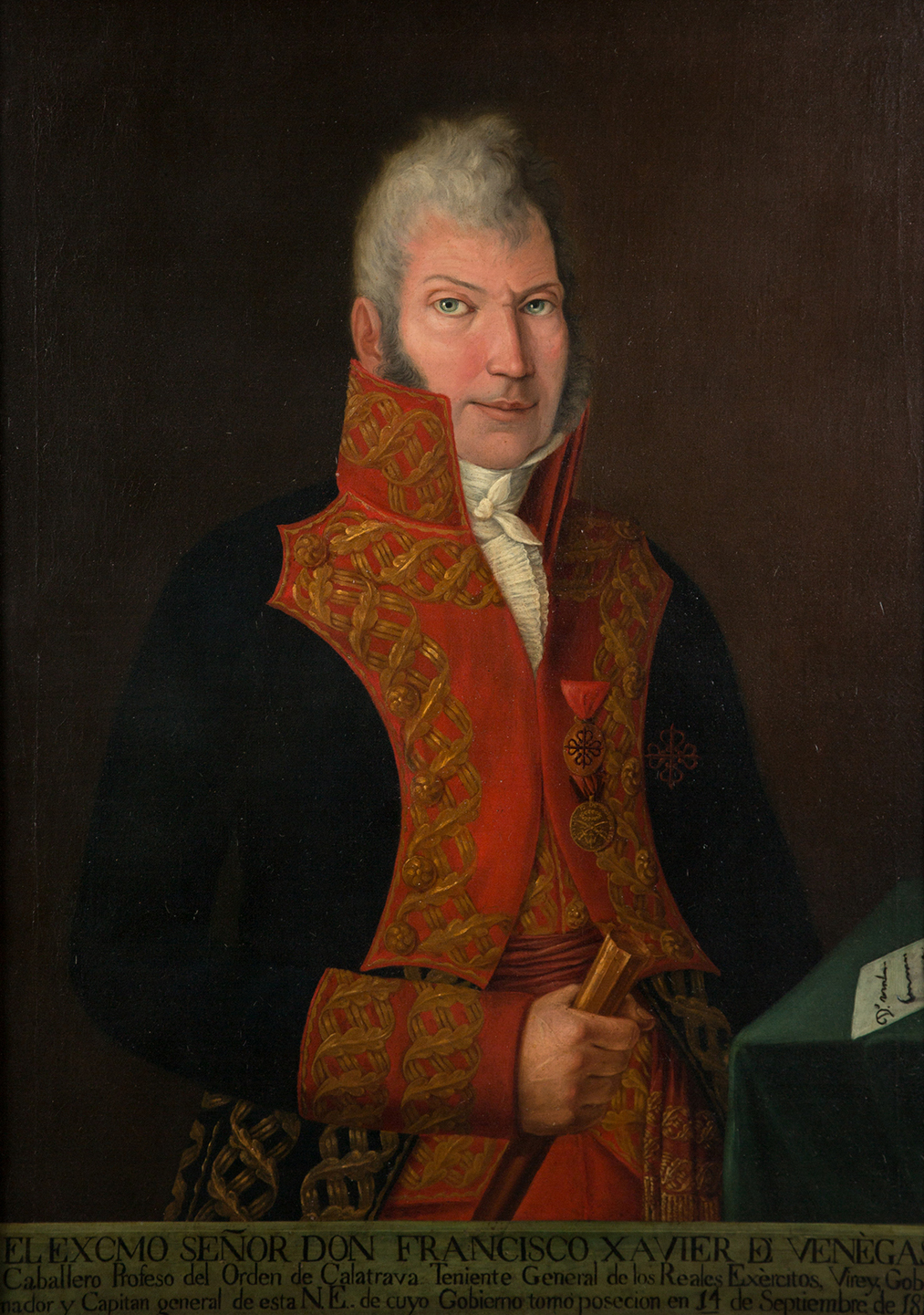
Venegas as Viceroy

Two days after Venegas took office, Father Miguel Hidalgo y Costilla delivered the Grito de Dolores (the Cry from Dolores) and rose in rebellion. Venegas recognized that this was not a minor disturbance. He quickly had recourse to the army to suppress the rebels. The capital was left without a garrison in order to increase the number of troops in the field. He ordered the clergy to preach against them.

With the fall of Celaya (September 21), Guanajuato (September 28), Zacatecas (October 7) and Valladolid (October 17) to the rebels, Venegas began to refer to them as insurgentes, the name by which they are still known in Mexico. He raised the Tres Villas regiment, with troops from Córdoba, Xalapa and Orizaba, and accepted a contingent of 500 Negroes freed from the haciendas of Gabriel J. de Yermo. These troops were put under the command of Lieutenant Colonel Torcuato Trujillo.

On October 19, 1810, in Valladolid, Father Hidalgo issued a decree freeing the slaves. On November 29, in Guadalajara, he extended it to all of New Spain and also abolished tribute payments.

Trujillo knew the insurgents were now marching in the direction of the capital, from Tepetongo to Toluca, so he moved to occupy the latter place. (Toluca is less than 75 kilometers from Mexico City.) Toluca, however, had to be abandoned and the royalists fell back to a canyon known as Monte de las Cruces. Here the insurgents under Hidalgo and Ignacio Allende defeated the royalists on October 30, 1810. Trujillo, Agustín de Iturbide, and other royalist leaders escaped.

Venegas was now greatly alarmed. He raised a battalion of volunteers, which he stationed at Paseo de Bucareli, on the western edge of the city. However, in a moment of apparent indecision, Father Hidalgo, after a series of triumphs and within striking distance of the poorly defended capital, ordered a retreat toward Vallodalid. The reason for this has never been adequately explained.

After the retreat of the insurgents, Venegas recovered from his surprise, and began decisive action against them. He ordered General Félix María Calleja to march to the aid of the capital from San Luis Potosí. In his march from Querétaro to Mexico City, Calleja met the insurgents in the plains of San Jerónimo Aculco, where he defeated and decimated them (November 7). Another group of rebels took Guadalajara on November 11. Calleja retook Guanajuato on November 25 and Guadalajara on January 21, 1811.

Calleja defeated the insurgents again, disastrously, in the battle of Puente de Calderón on January 17, 1811. The insurgents were on the point of victory when a grenade ignited a munitions wagon in their camp, sowing confusion. The royalists took advantage, and routed the insurgents. A remnant of the rebel forces began retreating northward, where they hoped to receive moral and material aid from the United States.

However the principal rebel leaders — Hidalgo, Allende, Juan Aldama, Jiménez and Abasolo — were taken prisoner at the Wells of Baján (Norias de Baján) near Monclova, Coahuila, on 21 March 1811. They were sent to Chihuahua, where, on July 26, 1811, Allende, Aldama and Jiménez were shot as traitors. Hidalgo was shot July 30, 1811. Abasolo was sentenced to perpetual imprisonment; he died in Cádiz in 1816.

Venegas now believed the insurrection over, but then came the news of the activities of Ignacio López Rayón in the center of the country and the victories of Father José María Morelos in the south. Guerrillas roamed freely around the country. Royalist troops shot prisoners immediately. The slightest suspicion of collaboration with the insurgents was grounds for arrest and imprisonment.

== The Constitution of Cádiz ==
The Cortes of Cádiz, which served as a parliamentary Regency after Ferdinand VII was deposed, had written and promulgated the Spanish Constitution of 1812, ordering that it be published in all the Spanish possessions. Venegas, a supporter of absolutism, delayed its publication in New Spain for 24 days. Officials of the New Spain government swore to uphold it on September 30, 1812, but it was moot because Venegas had declared a state of siege. (Less than two years later the next viceroy, General Calleja, declared it void in New Spain.) Under the state of siege, Venegas also disregarded other directives from the Junta. After much vacillation he published the press law, but soon abolished it, claiming "abuses have been committed".

== Removal and return to Spain ==
The Cortes of Cádiz blamed Venegas for his arbitrary measures, believing that they impeded the pacification of the country. The Audiencia of Mexico and the Spanish party in New Spain accused him of a lack of energy in suppressing the rebellion. He was relieved of his post September 16, 1812, but this did not take effect until March 4, 1813, when General Calleja was installed as viceroy.

Venegas then returned immediately to Spain, where the king rewarded him with the title of Marqués de la Reunión y de Nueva España. He was named captain general of Galicia in 1818.

Government offices
Preceded by Antonio José Amar	Viceroy of New Granada; 1810	Succeeded by Manuel de Bernardo Álvarez (dictator); Later Benito Pérez Brito
Preceded by Francisco Javier de Lizana	Viceroy of New Spain; 1810–1813	Succeeded by Félix María Calleja del Rey
