= Gabriel J. de Yermo =

Mexican landowner and merchant (1757–1813)

Gabriel J. de Yermo (1757 Sodupe, near Bilbao, Spain – 1813, Mexico City) was a wealthy landowner in New Spain, leader of the anti-independence party, and leader of the coup that overthrew Viceroy José de Iturrigaray in 1808.

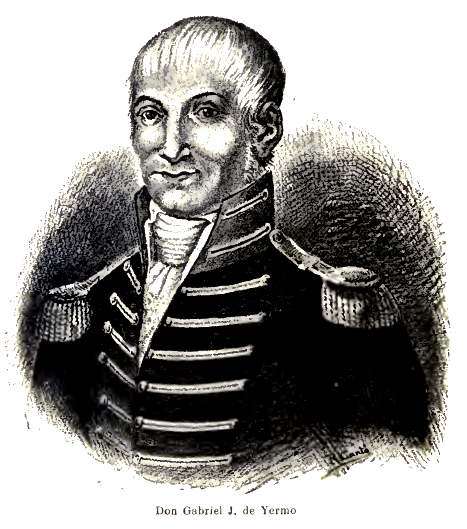
Gabriel J. de Yermo

== Life before the coup ==
When Gabriel de Yermo moved from Spain to New Spain, he married María Josefa de Yermo, his first cousin and heiress of the haciendas of Temixco and San Gabriel, in the modern state of Morelos. He later came to control the monopoly on aguardiente and the sale of meat in Mexico City.

In 1790, Yermo celebrated the birth of his first child by freeing all of his more than 400 slaves. In 1797, he acquired the hacienda of Jalmolonga, which belonged to the Jesuits, and did the same with the slaves that worked there. In 1808, to celebrate the saint day of his wife, 200 slaves belonging to the Hacienda de Temixco were freed. This was one of the reasons why these former slaves did not contribute to the independence movement, but were instead on the royalist side, initially helping to defeat Viceroy Iturrigaray in 1808 and later remaining loyal to the King of Spain into the 1820s, after many Spanish-born generals and civil servants had switched their loyalty to an independent Mexico.

== Discontent and the movement for independence of New Spain ==
News of the abdication of the Spanish king, Ferdinand VII, in favor of Napoleon was received in Mexico on July 14, 1808. It produced immediate discontent among the Criollos (Spaniards born in New Spain). On July 19, 1808, members of the Cabildo (city council) of Mexico City Juan Francisco Azcárate y Ledesma and Francisco Primo de Verdad y Ramos presented a plan to form a junta—that is, a provisional, autonomous government—of New Spain, with Viceroy Iturrigaray at its head. The plan was accepted by the viceroy and the Cabildo, but not by the Audiencia. It was also vehemently opposed by the Peninsulares (Spaniards resident in New Spain, but born in the mother country).

On September 1, 1808, Melchor de Talamantes, a Peruvian priest and the intellectual leader of the Criollo party, delivered two tracts to the Cabildo, in favor of separation from Spain and of the convoking of a Mexican congress. His premises were that all ties to Spain had now been broken with the abdication of the Bourbons; that regional laws had to be made, independently of the mother country; that the Audiencia could not speak on behalf of the king; and that the king having disappeared, sovereignty was now vested in the people.

It looked as if open fighting would break out between the partisans of the Audiencia (the Peninsulares) and those of the Cabildo (the Criollos).

== The coup and the deposition of the viceroy ==
Iturrigaray, because of his sympathy with the independence party, was held in great suspicion by the Spanish party. The latter chose Yermo as its head.

Iturrigaray was on the point of resigning when, on September 15, 1808 Yermo and his partisans arrested him. Yermo was supported by the rich Spanish merchants, by the oidores Aguirre and Bataller, by the archbishop, and by the judges of the Inquisition. Five hundred well-armed conspirators attacked the viceregal palace at 2 in the morning. One soldier was killed. The members of the Cabildo were also arrested. Marshall Pedro de Garibay, a puppet of the Spanish party, was installed as the new viceroy.

Yermo was created marquis by King Fernando VII. He died in 1813, during the course of Mexico's war of independence.
