= Pedro José de Fonte y Hernández Miravete =

His Excellency Pedro José de Fonte
- Archbishop of Mexico
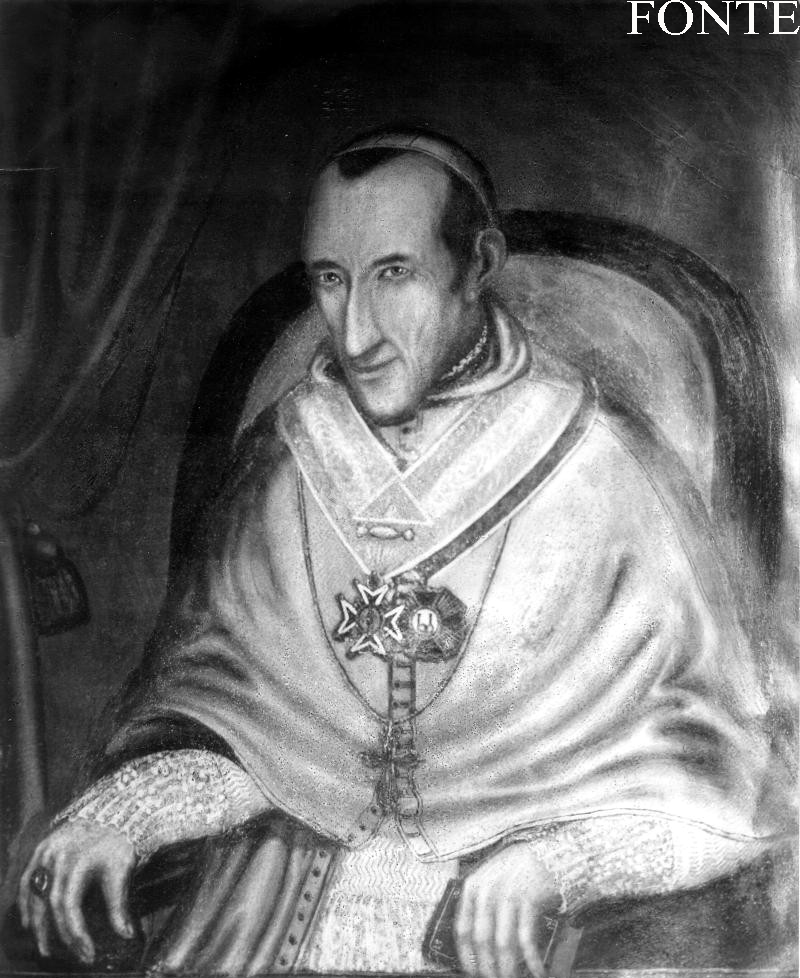
- See: Mexico
- Appointed: 4 September 1815
- Term ended: 28 December 1837
- Predecessor: Francisco Javier de Lizana
- Successor: Manuel Posada y Garduño

Orders
- Ordination: 29 June 1816 by Antonio Bergosa y Jordán

Personal details
- Born: 13 March 1777 Linares de Mora, Spain
- Died: 11 June 1839 (aged 62) Madrid, Spain
- Denomination: Roman Catholic Church

Pedro José de Fonte y Hernández Miravete (13 March 1777, Linares de Mora, Teruel–11 June 1839, Madrid) was Archbishop of Mexico from 1815 to 1837.

He was the last Spaniard to hold the post, his period in office was when Mexico achieved its independence from Spain.

He crowned the first Emperor of Mexico, Agustín de Iturbide, and the Empress Ana María de Huarte y Muñiz.

He was also a member of the regency council of Maria Christina of the Two Sicilies during the minority of Isabella II of Spain.
