= Alonso Núñez de Haro y Peralta =

Mexican politician

His Excellency Alonso Núñez de Haro y Peralta
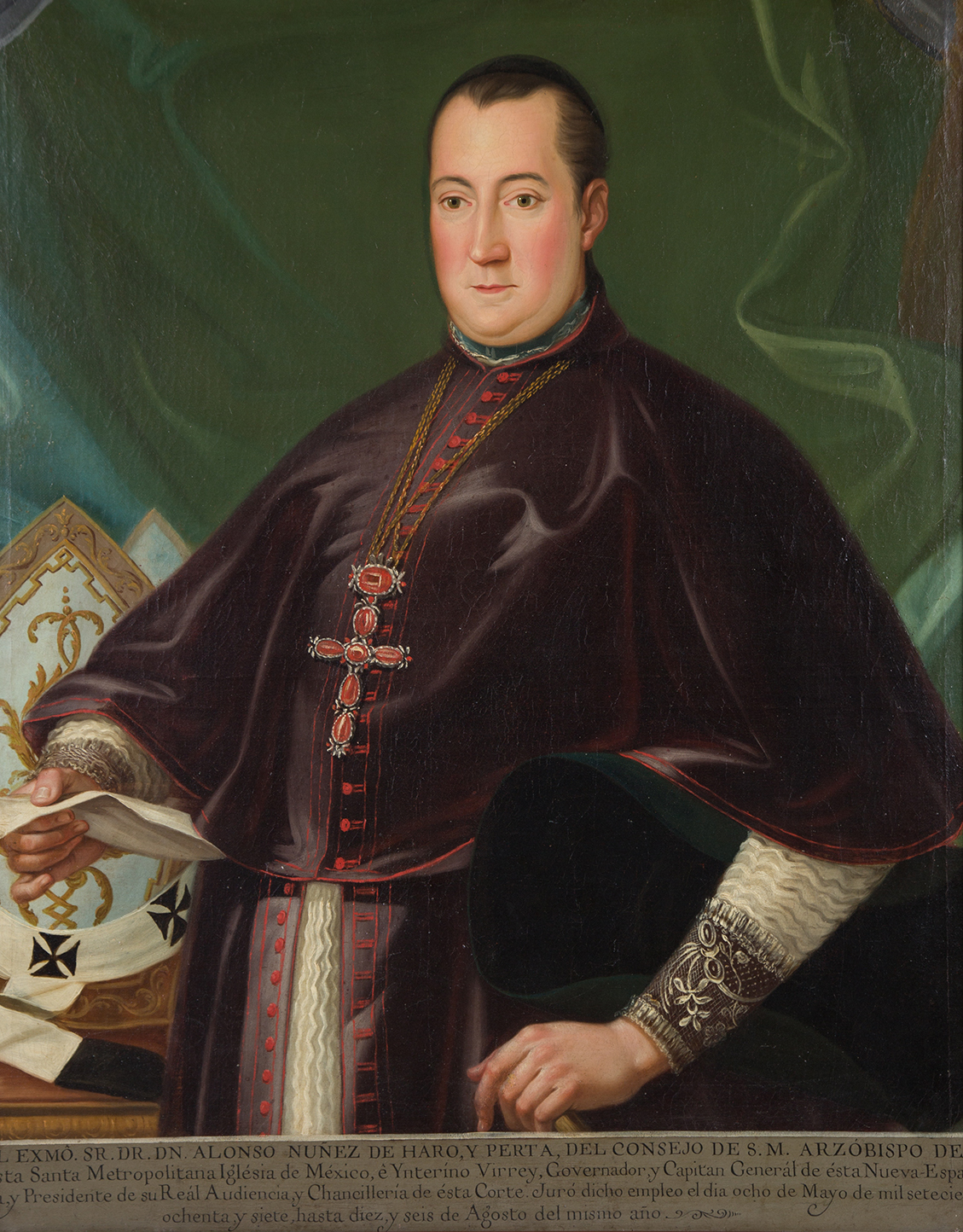

50th Viceroy of New Spain
- In office 8 May 1787 – 16 August 1787
- Monarch: Charles III
- Preceded by: Bernardo de Gálvez y Madrid
- Succeeded by: Manuel Antonio Flórez
- Archbishop of Mexico
- See: Mexico
- Appointed: 30 March 1772
- Term ended: 26 May 1800
- Predecessor: Francisco Antonio de Lorenzana y Butrón
- Successor: Francisco Javier de Lizana y Beaumont

Orders
- Ordination: 13 September 1772

Personal details
- Born: 31 October 1729 Villagarcía del Llano, Cuenca Province, Spain
- Died: 26 May 1800 (aged 70) Mexico City, New Spain (now Mexico)
- Denomination: Roman Catholic Church
- Education: University of Toledo; University of Bologna; University of Ávila

Dr. Alonso Núñez de Haro y Peralta (October 31, 1729 – May 26, 1800) was archbishop of Mexico from September 12, 1772, to May 26, 1800, and viceroy of New Spain from May 8, 1787, to August 16, 1787.

== Origins and education ==
Núñez de Haro was born in the diocese of Cuenca, Spain, probably on October 31, 1729, although some sources give the date as November 1. He began his studies at the University of Toledo, then received his doctorate from the University of Bologna. Thereafter he became professor at the University of Ávila. He was also a canon in Segovia and Toledo. Studious and intelligent, he learned Latin, Greek, Hebrew, French and Italian.

In 1771 he was named archbishop of Mexico.

== Archbishop of Mexico ==
As archbishop, he converted the Jesuit colegio of Tepotzotlán into the Seminario de Instrucción, Retiro Voluntario y Corrección, a combined site of instruction for priests, retirement home, and jail for ecclesiastics, since with ecclesiastical privileges (fuero eclesiástico), priests were under the jurisdiction of canonical courts. At the seminary, he committed to studies relevant to Mexico by creating chairs in Mexican, Otomí, and Church history. He advanced the work on the Chapel of Pocito in Guadalupe and on the cathedral in Mexico City. He established a foundling home and a Capuchin convent. He added many books to the library of the archdiocese and ordered scholarships and prizes for distinguished seminary students.

In 1770 Archbishop Núñez de Haro also converted a Jesuit seminary and residence into the Hospital San Andrés. This hospital was modeled on the General Hospital in Madrid and was intended to treat all ailments. In 1788 he added to its functions those of the Hospital Amor de Dios, ("love of God") which was dedicated to the treatment of syphilis. The Hospital San Andrés remained the responsibility of the archdiocese, although it received considerable official support. It eventually had a capacity of 1,000 beds, arranged in 39 wards. In addition, it contained the largest apothecary shop in New Spain, a chandler's shop, a laboratory, and a department for dissections and post mortem examinations. It had the income of 22 urban properties, a share of the tithes, and a monopoly on the game of pelota.

He was concerned about Church doctrine and orthodoxy, and condemned the doctrine of probabilism, promoted by the Jesuits. Haro supported obedience to the Spanish monarch, and followed the request of Minister of the Indies, José de Gálvez to "exhort his flock not to defraud the Crown of its legitimate revenue by engaging in contraband."

Around 1770, Núñez de Haro wrote to Charles III recommending that major government positions be reserved to those born in Spain, arguing that creoles were unsuited to high office. This was an unpopular stance, especially among creoles, and a 1771 complaint from the municipal council asked Charles III to reprimand Núñez de Haro.

== Viceroy of New Spain ==
In general, the Spanish monarchy appointed non-Churchmen to the position of viceroy, but New Spain's archbishops had to step in as interim viceroy throughout the colonial period. Viceroy Bernardo de Gálvez y Madrid died November 30, 1786, so as Archbishop of Mexico Núñez de Haro was named as interim viceroy on May 8, 1787. He served for three months, until turning over the office to the newly arrived viceroy Manuel Antonio Flórez on August 16, 1787.

During his term, he consolidated the establishment of the intendencias, proposed by José de Gálvez when he was visitador general. These were provincial administrations throughout the colony responsible to the viceroy. A botanical garden was founded, and plants were brought from all parts of the colony. Naturalist Martín Sessé y Lacasta was named the director.

He tried to aid the Indigenous by abolishing their tribute requirements, but his orders were not carried out. He proposed reforms of the court for the Indians, cutting costs and red tape. He sent a large sum of money to Havana to buy slaves from the British and Dutch.

After leaving the office of viceroy, Núñez de Haro continued as archbishop of Mexico for the remainder of his life. In 1792 King Charles IV decorated him with the Gran Cruz de Carlos III. Until his death in 1800, he continued to receive the treatment and honors due the viceroy of New Spain.

Catholic Church titles
| Preceded by Francisco Antonio de Lorenzana y Butrón | Archbishop of Mexico; 1772 – 1800 | Succeeded by Francisco Javier de Lizana y Beaumont |
Government offices
| Preceded by Bernardo de Gálvez y Madrid | Viceroy of New Spain; 1787 | Succeeded by Manuel Antonio Flórez |
