= Ayamo moyolpachihuitia in Totlatocatzin Rey D. Fernando VII =

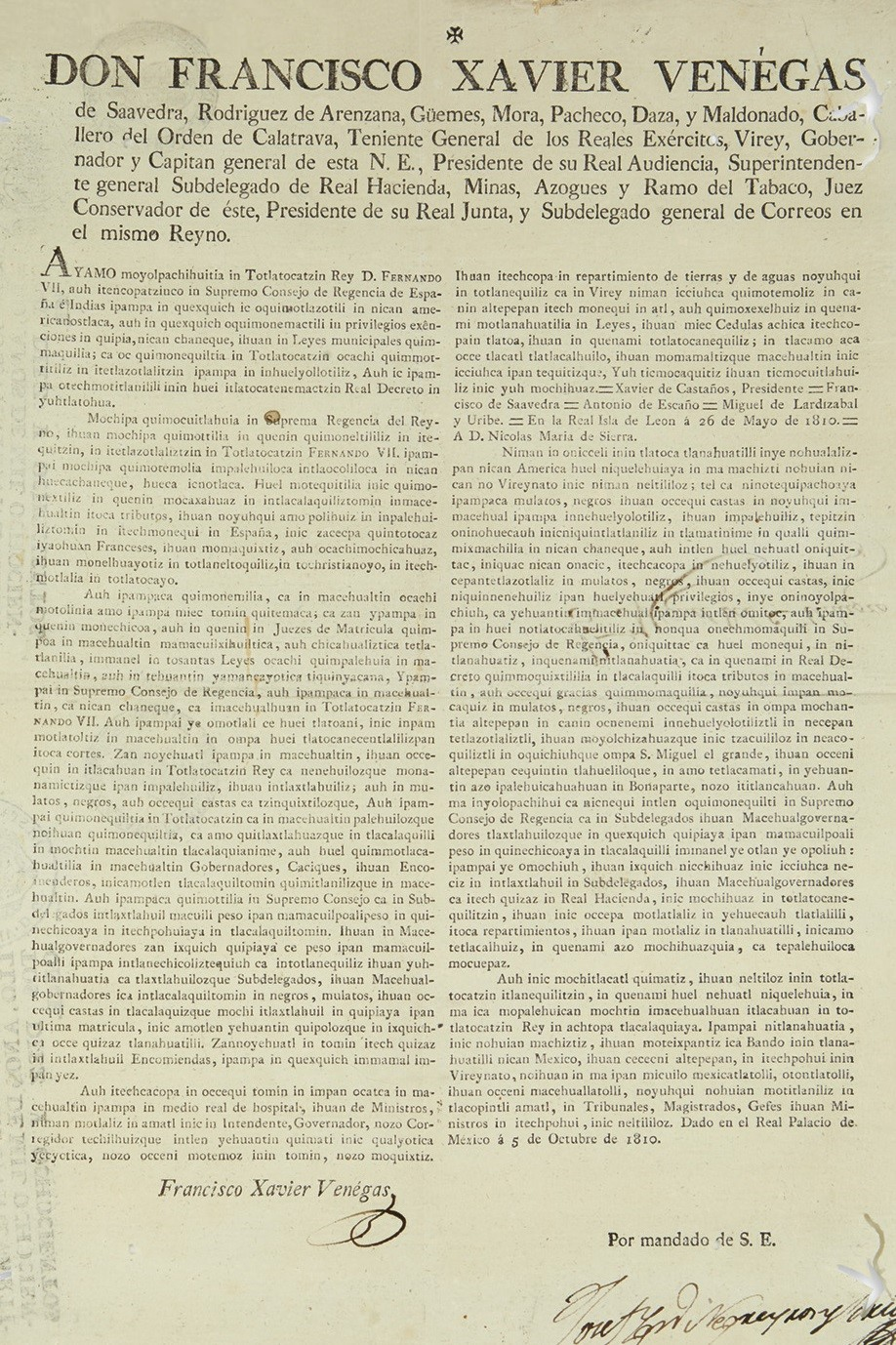
A copy of the broadside, held by the Lilly Library, Indiana University.

"Ayamo moyolpachihuitia in Totlatocatzin Rey D. Fernando VII..." ('Our ruler King Don Fernando VII is not yet satisfied') are the first words of a Nahuatl-language broadside printed on October 5, 1810, by Francisco Javier Venegas de Saavedra, viceroy of New Spain, as propaganda during the Hidalgo revolt. It announced the abolition of tribute payment by the Indians of New Spain, which, it was hoped, would reduce Indian support for the rebellion.

Although Venegas stated that Nahuatl was used simply to reach as many Indians as possible, relatively few speakers of Nahuatl were literate, and those that were usually could also read Spanish or Latin. It is more likely that Nahuatl was used for ideological reasons, to strengthen the legitimacy of the colonial government in the eyes of native people. Indigenous languages and Nahuatl in particular had been banned in 1770, and the use of Nahuatl in government publications in 1810 was a new endorsement of the language.

The translation of the text into Nahuatl has been attributed to Rafael Tiburcio Sandoval. The text shares several orthographic and grammatical traits with Sandoval's grammar of Nahuatl, which was also published in 1810 and was the first new work to be published in Nahuatl since the ban.

== Bibliography ==
- Hernández y Dávalos, Juan E. (2007) [1877–1882]. "071 El bando anterior en mexicano" (PDF). Colección de documentos para la Historia de la Guerra de Independencia de Juan E. Hernández y Dávalos. UNAM. pp. tomo II. A transcription of the Nahuatl text.
- Morris, Mark (2007). "Language In Service of the State: The Nahuatl Counterinsurgency Broadsides of 1810". Hispanic American Historical Review. 87 (3): 433–470. doi:10.1215/00182168-2007-001.
