= José de Iturrigaray =

Mexican politician (1742–1815)

The Most Excellent José de Iturrigaray KOS
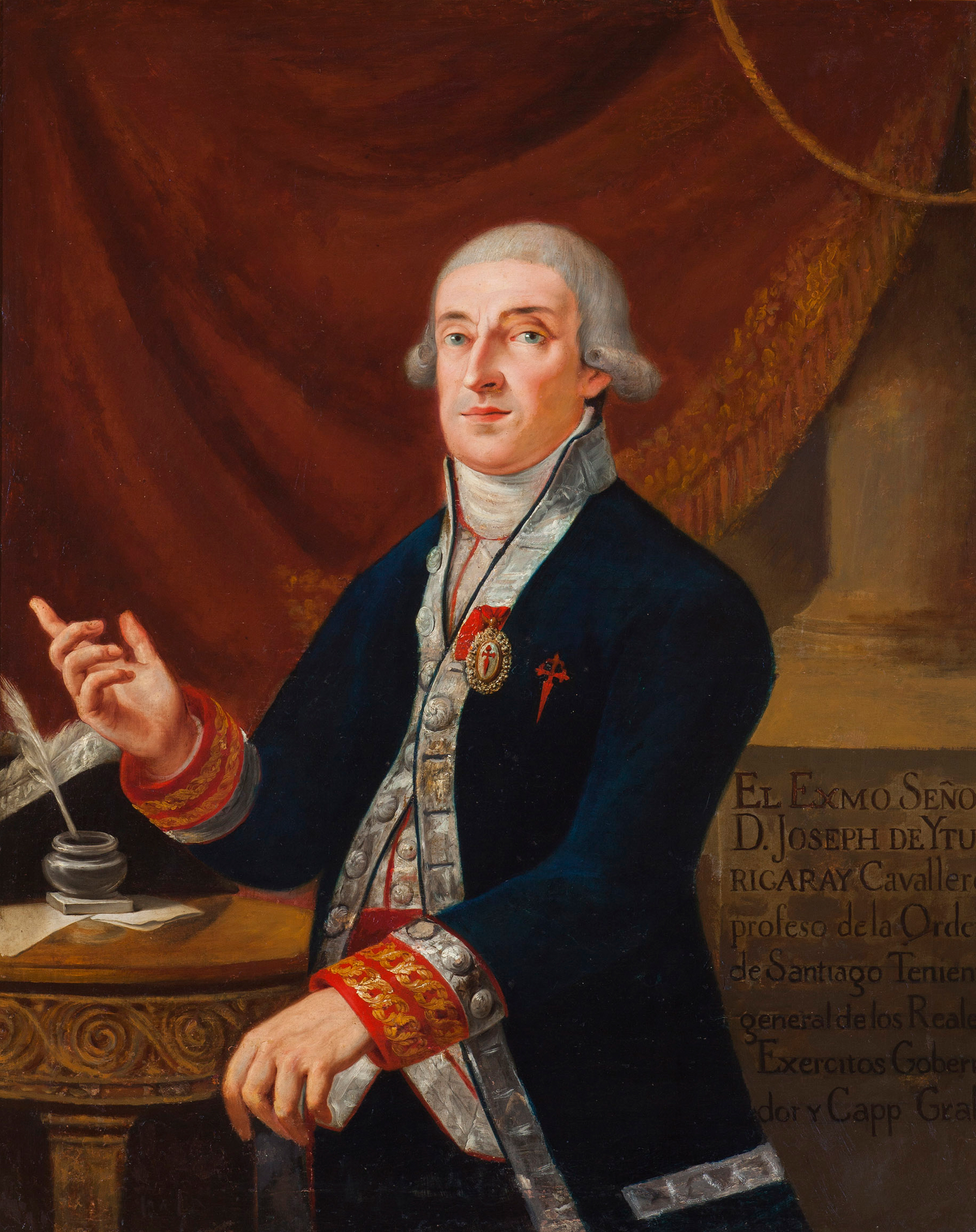
- Portrait by an unknown artist

56th Viceroy of New Spain
- In office 4 January 1803 – 16 September 1808
- Monarch: Charles IV
- Preceded by: Félix Berenguer de Marquina
- Succeeded by: Pedro de Garibay

Personal details
- Born: José Joaquín Vicente de Iturrigaray y Aróstegui de Gaínza y Larrea; 27 June 1742 Cádiz, Spain
- Died: 22 August 1815 (aged 73) Madrid, Spain
- Spouse: María Inés de Jáuregui y Aróstegui

Military service
- Allegiance: Spain
- Branch/service: Spanish Army
- Rank: General
- Battles/wars: Seven Years' War; War of the Pyrenees; War of the Oranges

José Joaquín Vicente de Iturrigaray y Aróstegui, KOS (27 June 1742, Cádiz, Spain – 22 August 1815, Madrid) was a Spanish military officer and viceroy of New Spain, from 4 January 1803 to 16 September 1808, during Napoleon's invasion of Spain and the establishment of a Bonapartist regime in Spain. His plans to form a provisional autonomous government led to his arrest and deposition.

== Origins and military career ==
Iturrigaray was born of a family of wealthy Vizcaíno (Basque) merchants in Cádiz. His parents were José Yturrigaray y Gainza, born in Pamplona, Navarre, and María Manuela de Aróstegui y Larrea, born in Aranaz, Navarre.

Under Charles III in 1762 he took part in the Spanish invasion of Portugal and in Gibraltar. In 1793, now under Charles IV, he earned fame for the courage shown in the War of the Pyrenees with Republican France. In 1801 he was commander in chief of the army of Andalucía in the so-called War of the Oranges with Portugal, under the command of Generalissimo Manuel de Godoy.

== Viceroy of New Spain ==
After serving as governor of Cádiz from 1793 to 1798, Iturrigaray was named viceroy of New Spain by Godoy. Iturrigaray arrived in the colony in 1803 with his wife, María Inés de Jáuregui y Aróstegui. She was the daughter of Agustin de Jaúregui y Aldecoa, Viceroy of Peru, born in Lecároz, Valle de Baztán, Navarra, and María Luisa de Aróstegui y Bassave, born in Habana, Cuba, a first cousin of José de Iturrigaray y Aróstegui. When he passed through customs at Veracruz, he brought with him a huge shipment of goods, which entered free of duty because he declared it his personal baggage. The king sent him a large quantity of arms, which the viceroy provided to the regiments of Mexico and Puebla, then stationed in Cuba. Iturrigaray soon gained popularity for his friendly and jovial character, which contrasted with the austere character of his predecessor, Félix Berenguer de Marquina.

In June he visited the current state of Guanajuato, for the announced purpose of opening a public granary. He also inspected the mines of La Valenciana and Rayas, and received a present of 1,000 ounces of gold. He offered to request from Spain a sufficient amount of mercury to work the mines. Passing through Celaya, he granted permission for the Ayuntamiento (city government) there to celebrate corridas (bullfights), and to build a bridge over the Río La Laja. The bridge was to be constructed under the direction of the architect Francisco Eduardo Tresguerras.

On December 9, 1803 he inaugurated Manuel Tolsá's bronze equestrian statue of Charles IV in the Zócalo in the Center of Mexico City. The first stone in the pedestal had been laid July 18, 1796 by then-Viceroy Miguel de la Grúa Talamanca y Branciforte, marqués de Branciforte, and the statue had been cast on August 4, 1802.

On March 22, 1803 the Prussian explorer and naturalist Baron Alexander von Humboldt arrived in Acapulco from Peru in the ship Pizarro. Humboldt spent a year in New Spain, spending time in Mexico City and especially important time in the mining area of Guanajuato. Since the crown had given Humboldt unlimited access to travel and investigate New Spain, Iturrigaray directly aided Humboldt's research, first published in his Political Essay on the Kingdom of New Spain. Humboldt estimated the population of New Spain to be 6 million.

On March 18, 1804 an expedition for the propagation of smallpox vaccine under Dr. Francisco Javier de Balmis also arrived. The viceroy's reception of this expedition was less enthusiastic than the leaders had anticipated. Nevertheless, Dr. Juan Arboleya vaccinated the son of the viceroy.

In March 1805 news was received in New Spain of the renewed declaration of war by Spain against Britain. Iturrigaray received orders to put the colony in a state of defense, and to increase the regular payments to Spain. To do this, he applied the Cédula de la Caja de Consolidación. This order was the equivalent of disentailment of the church because it ordered the transfer of income from the religious estates and foundations to the government. A direct result of this order was the strengthening of the Spanish opponents of the viceroyalty, who raised protests. Among them was Bishop Manuel Abad y Queipo.

Popular discontent grew with the increase in taxes. So did the discontent of the Peninsulares (Spaniards born in Spain), because of the favor shown by the viceroy to the Criollos (Spaniards born in America). And among the latter there began to appear a spirit of independence inspired by news of the disturbance at Aranjuez and the political defeat of the royal Prime Minister Manuel Godoy. Iturrigaray saw the necessity of relying on the Criollo party to maintain his power.

On April 30, 1803, Napoleon sold Louisiana to the United States for 80 million francs. In 1806, that country asked the Marqués de Casa Calvo, to remove the Spanish troops from New Orleans so that the United States could take possession of the area up to the Sabine River.

== Situation in Spain ==
In 1808 Napoleon's French invaded Spain. As the French forces approached Madrid, the royal family decided to flee to New Spain. This idea, however, was poorly received by the Spanish populace. On March 17, 1808 a riot broke out at Aranjuez. The hated Godoy was apprehended by the crowd, humiliated, stripped of his honors, and nearly killed. The mob, loyal to Prince Ferdinand (later King Ferdinand VII), forced Charles to abdicate in his son's behalf. Ferdinand then had Godoy arrested. But in May, all three — Godoy, Ferdinand and Charles — were enticed across the French border, where Napoleon took them prisoner. Napoleon forced the abdication of both Ferdinand and Charles in favor of himself. He then named his brother, Joseph Bonaparte, king of Spain.

On May 2, 1808, the people of Madrid rose in arms against the French. This was the spark that began a country-wide revolt. Everywhere provisional juntas were organized claiming to govern in the name of Ferdinand VII.

== Consequences in New Spain ==
Iturrigaray had been appointed viceroy with orders to put down any rebellion, but the situation in Spain with the Napoleonic invasion, and the "political events back home bewildered him." News of the situation in Spain was received in Mexico on June 23, 1808, and the following July 14, news of the abdication of the Spanish king in favor of Napoleon was also received.

Viceroy Iturrigaray was presented with a report by the Mexico City Cabildo (city council) proposing that as the throne of Spain was now occupied by a usurper, the royal power should now be transferred to the viceroy, who would refuse to recognize the authority of Spain as long as it was under foreign domination. Iturrigaray accepted the charge, which was opposed by the Audiencia, whose members were mostly Spanish born as opposed to the Ayuntamiento whose members had been criollos. The viceroy now began work on organizing a national congress.

On July 20, 1808, Diego Leño of the Ayuntamiento of Jalapa, called for a congress of representatives from throughout New Spain.

The Criollo party continued to agitate, asking for the formation of a junta, as in Spain, and the convening of a congress. Once again the Audiencia was opposed, arguing that New Spain was a colony, and not permitted to take this kind of decision.

On August 9, 1808, at a meeting of Notables, the lawyer Primo Verdad y Ramos spoke in favor of popular sovereignty. Some of the oidores (judges on the Audiencia) spoke in rebuttal, declaring the proposal seditious and subversive. Inquisitor Bernardo Prado y Ovejero declared it heresy and anathema. The Notables adopted an intermediate position — New Spain would recognize no authority above the king of Spain.

On August 31, 1808 the crisis took a sharper turn with the arrival of Juan Gabriel Jabat, representative of the Junta of Seville, and a message from the Junta of Asturias. Both juntas requested recognition as the legitimate government of Spain by New Spain, thus providing evidence of the lack of any legitimate government in the country.

On September 1, 1808, Melchor de Talamantes, a Peruvian priest and the intellectual leader of the Criollo party, delivered two tracts to the Cabildo, in favor of separation from Spain and of the convoking of a Mexican congress. His premises were that all ties to Spain had now been broken; that regional laws had to be made, independently of the mother country; that the Audiencia could not speak in behalf of the king; and that the king having disappeared, sovereignty was now vested in the people.

It looked as if open fighting would break out between the mostly Peninsular partisans of the Audiencia and the Criollo ones of the Cabildo. A further meeting on September 9 was tumultuous.

== Coup deposing the viceroy ==
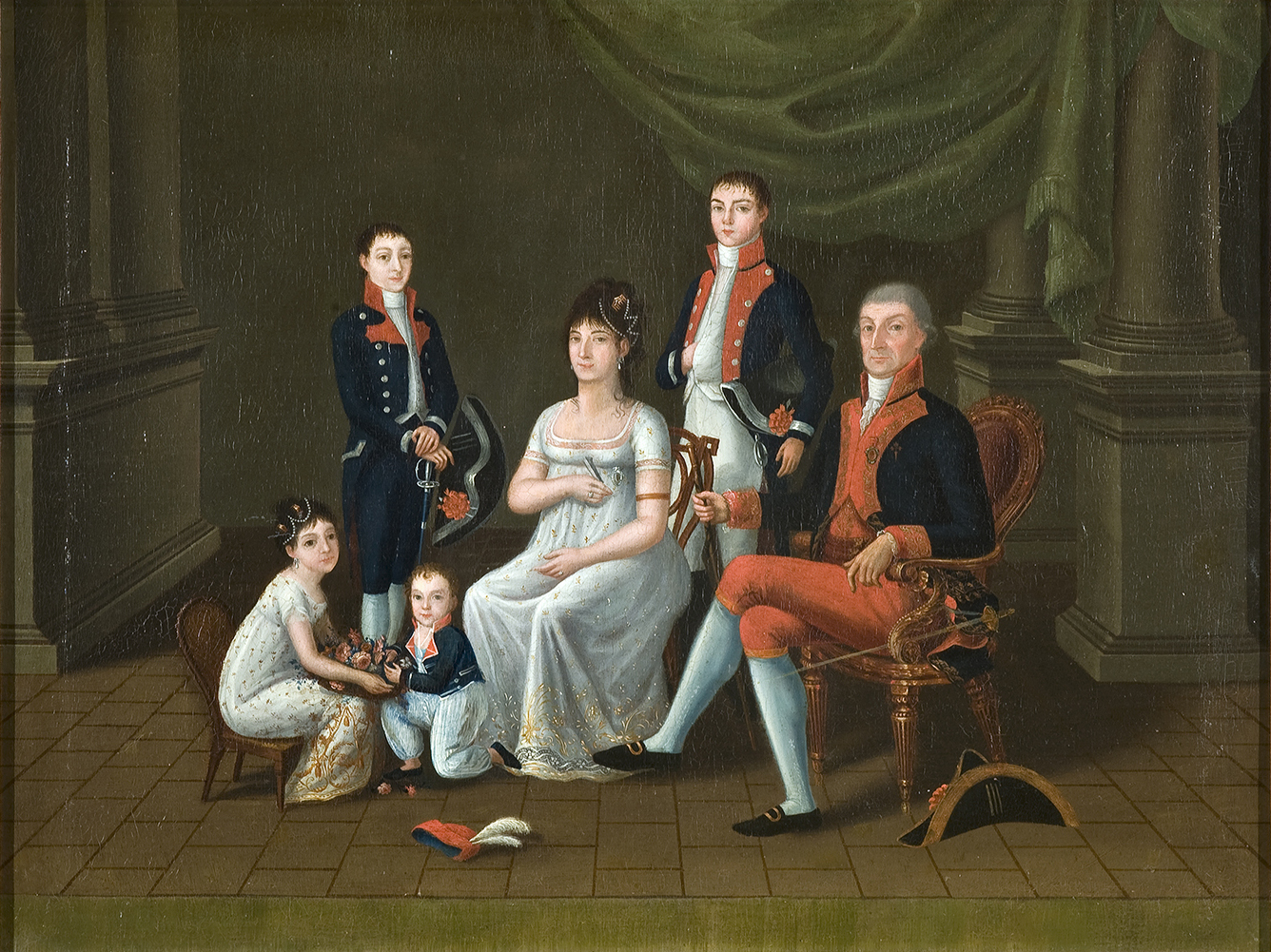
Viceroy Iturrigaray and his family, 1805

Iturrigaray was strongly inclined towards the party of the Criollos and held in great suspicion by the Spanish party. He had received Criollo petitions for a congress and disrecognition of the Spanish junta. He had ordered 40,000 pesos sent to the Consulado of Veracruz, notoriously liberal in outlook. He had nominated Criollos to high positions in the administration. And most importantly, he had mobilized the regiment of dragoons from Aguascalientes, stationed in Jalapa. This regiment was under the command of Colonel Ignacio Obregón, an intimate friend of the viceroy.

Iturrigaray was on the point of resigning when, on September 15, 1808 the pro-Spanish party, headed by Gabriel J. de Yermo, arrested him. Yermo was supported by the rich Spanish merchants, by the oidores Aguirre and Bataller, by the archbishop, and by the judges of the Inquisition. Five hundred well-armed conspirators attacked the viceregal palace at 2 in the morning. One soldier was killed. The members of the Cabildo were also arrested.

After Iturrigaray was taken prisoner, he was conducted to the Inquisition, so that the populace could be made to believe he had been deposed for heresy. His wife and children were taken to the convent of San Bernardo. The vicereine was cruelly insulted and her jewelry was stolen. The viceroy was deposed by the Audiencia. An inventory of the viceroy's valuables was ordered, and the total came to more than one million pesos. This was considered evidence that the viceroy had taken advantage of the situation for his personal enrichment.

In accordance with custom, the unanticipated vacancy in the office of viceroy was filled with the oldest and highest-ranking military officer in the colony, Marshall Pedro de Garibay, an octogenarian controlled by the Audiencia.

Primo Verdad y Ramos and Melchor de Talamantes were imprisoned, and died in jail. Also imprisoned were Lic. Cristo, Juan Francisco Azcárate and French general Octaviano d'Alvímar.

== Return to Spain ==
On September 21, 1808, Iturrigaray was sent as a prisoner to Spain. He was brought to trial in Cádiz for disloyalty. The charges were not proven and he was freed under the amnesty granted by the Cortes in 1810. A juicio de residencia continued after the amnesty, and was ended only by the death of Iturrigaray in 1815, but not before he was assessed a fine of 435,000 pesetas. According to most historians, he was also implicated in a private scheme by James Wilkinson to head off an invasion of Mexico by Aaron Burr.
