= Melchor de Talamantes =

Mexican activist

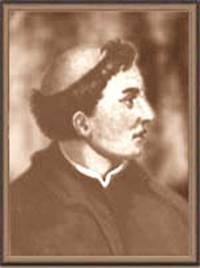
Friar Melchor de Talamantes, O.deM.

Melchor de Talamantes (in full, Melchor de Talamantes Salvador y Baeza) (January 10, 1765, Lima, Viceroyalty of Peru – May 9, 1809, Veracruz, Mexico), was a Mercedarian friar and priest, a political liberal, and a leader in Mexico's movement for independence from Spain.

== Early life ==
At the age of 14, Talamantes entered the Order of the Blessed Virgin Mary of Mercy. He obtained his doctorate of theology from the University of San Marcos. Afterwards he served as a high official in the Archdiocese of Lima, and for two years as an assistant to Viceroy of Peru, Francisco Gil de Taboada. During this time he came to know Hipólito Unanue, a fighter for the independence of America.

In 1796 Talamantes asked for his release from the Order, to become a secular priest. This was because his reading of forbidden books and his libertarian tendencies had led to difficulties with his religious superiors. He also asked to be transferred to Spain, by way of New Spain (Mexico). The second request was granted on September 20, 1798, and he left from Guayaquil for Mexico, arriving at Acapulco on November 26, 1799.8 August

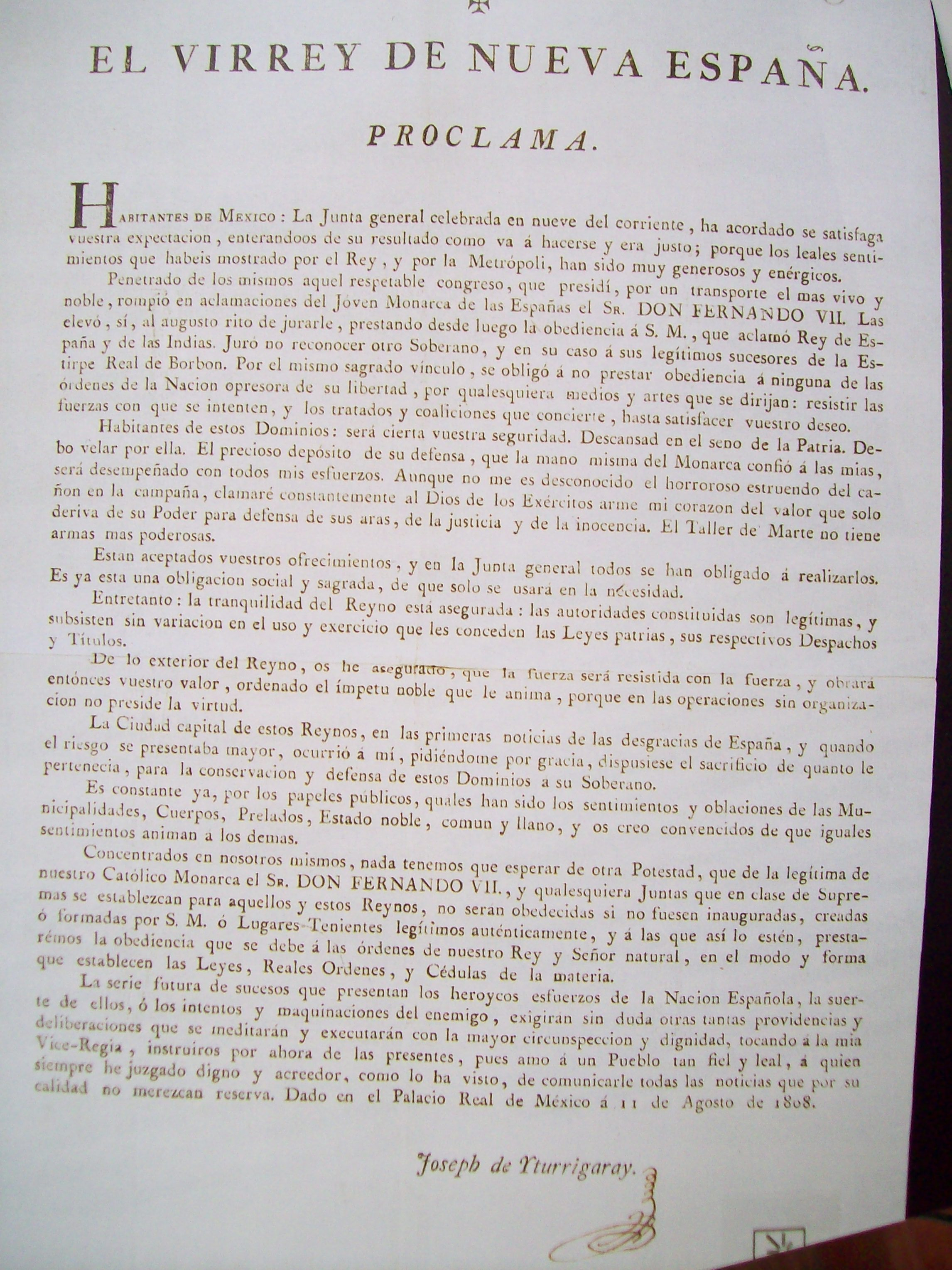
Proclamation of Viceroy Iturrigaray of August 11, 1808.

== Career in Mexico ==
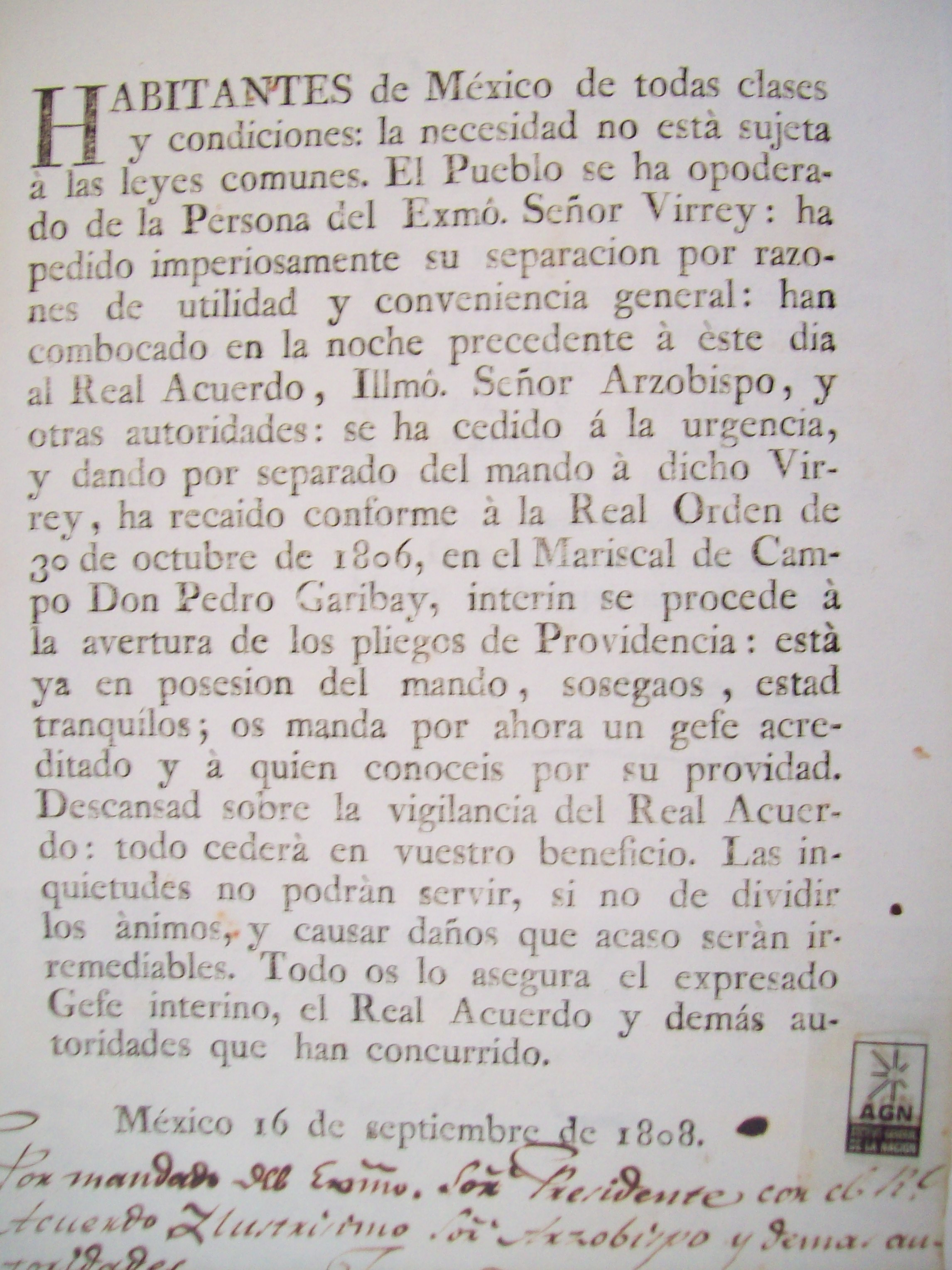
Bando of September 16, 1808, in which the deposition of Viceroy Iturrigaray and the appointment of Pedro Garibay as his replacement are announced to the population of New Spain.

Talamantes took up residence at the convent of his Order in Mexico City, where he dedicated himself to reading and meditation. On October 15, 1802, he delivered the lecture Panegyric of the glorious virgin and doctor, Saint Teresa of Jesús, which was printed, with permission, in the same year. On November 18 he delivered in the cathedral of the city the Funeral Oracion for the Spanish soldiers killed during the war.

In 1806 Viceroy José de Iturrigaray commissioned him to report on the boundaries between Texas (New Spain) and Louisiana.

Talamantes began attending gatherings and political meetings. He made friends of radical Criollos, played cards, contracted debts, and neglected his religious offices. He was named censor of the Diario de México, and came to have great influence in official circles, particularly in the Ayuntamiento (city government of Mexico City). He was now the intellectual leader of the Criollo faction.

In 1808, after the French invasion of Spain, the Criollos and some of the Spanish living in New Spain wanted to proclaim the independence of the colony and establish a governing junta, similar to the anti-French juntas in the mother country. On September 1, 1808, Talamantes delivered two tracts to the Ayuntamiento, in favor of separation from Spain and of the convoking of a Mexican congress. These tracts, Congreso Nacional del Reino de Nueva España (23 August 1808) and Representación Nacional de las Colonias, Discuso Filosófico (25 August 1808) argue that Spain had lost its sovereignty and that New Spain had the right to repossess it. His premises were that all ties to Spain had now been broken; that regional laws had to be made, independently of the mother country; that the Audienciacould not speak on behalf of the king; and that the king having disappeared, sovereignty was now vested in the people. His proposed congress was to represent all the provinces of New Spain. It was to be invested with the legislative authority of the new government. The courts already established were to exercise the judicial power, and Viceroy Iturrigaray was to be captain general (commander of the military) and, provisionally, chief executive. This was the government of a republic; there was no provision for a king.

Viceroy Iturrigaray was perceived to have some sympathy for this path, and, because of that, peninsular Spaniards opposed to that plan arrested the viceroy on the night of September 15, 1808. An investigation of the papers of Talamantes revealed him to be a leader in the movement. Many radical political tracts written by him were found in his house. Also many books were found, including some banned ones (for instance the works of Montesquieu and Adam Smith).

The detention of the viceroy and the others was followed by legal charges and physical cruelties. Talamantes was brought before a biased court. He was denied a lawyer. His enemies, among whom were members of his religious order, accused him of "disloyalty to the king and adhesion to the doctrines of independence". His trial lasted more than six months. He was convicted and sentenced to death, then ordered transferred to Spain for the execution of the sentence.

Fray Talamantes died of yellow fever in San Juan de Ulúa, Veracruz as he was being transferred in chains and under guard to Spain. He was provided no medical assistance, and indeed his chains were not removed until the moment of his burial, in a common grave.

He is honored today in Mexico as one of the protomartyrs of independence.
