= Charlotte of Belgium =

Empress of Mexico from 1864 to 1867

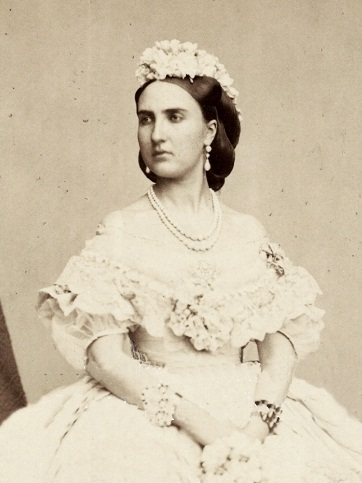
- Charlotte c. 1864

Empress consort of Mexico
- Tenure: 10 April 1864 – 19 June 1867
- Coronation: 10 June 1864
- Born: 7 June 1840; Palace of Laeken, Brussels, Belgium
- Died: 19 January 1927 (aged 86); Bouchout Castle, Meise, Belgium
- Burial: Royal Crypt, Church of Our Lady of Laeken
- Spouse: Maximilian I of Mexico (m. 1857; died 1867)
Names
- French: Marie Charlotte Amélie Augustine Victoire Clémentine Léopoldine; Spanish: María Carlota Amelia Augusta Victoria Clementina Leopoldina
- House: Saxe-Coburg and Gotha
- Father: Leopold I of Belgium
- Mother: Louise of Orléans
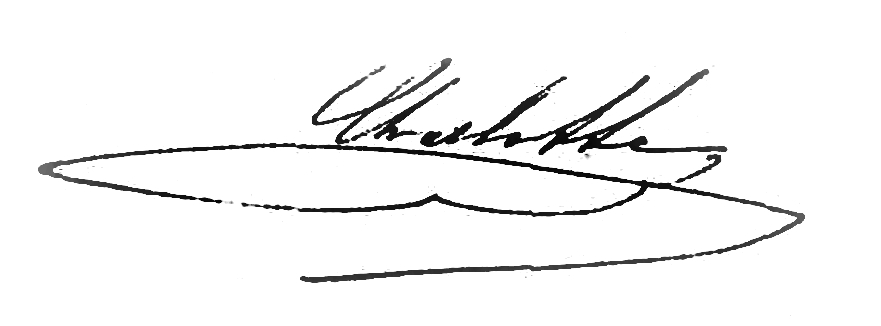
- Signature

Charlotte of Belgium (Note: French: Marie Charlotte Amélie Augustine Victoire Clémentine Léopoldine; Spanish: María Carlota Amelia Augusta Victoria Clementina Leopoldina) (7 June 1840 – 19 January 1927), also known by the Spanish version of her name, Carlota of Mexico, was by birth a Belgian princess and a member of the House of Saxe-Coburg and Gotha. As the wife of Maximilian of Austria, she became an Archduchess of Austria by marriage and Empress of Mexico from 1864. She was the daughter, granddaughter, sister, sister-in-law, cousin and wife of numerous reigning or deposed sovereigns throughout Europe and Mexico.

From the beginning of her marriage, Charlotte feuded with Empress Elisabeth in Vienna, and was glad when her husband was posted to Italy as Viceroy of Lombardy–Venetia. At this time, he was selected by the Emperor Napoleon III as a figurehead for his proposed French empire in Mexico, and Charlotte overcame her husband's doubts about the plan. Maximilian and Charlotte duly arrived in Mexico City in 1864, but their reign lasted little more than three years. She assisted her husband, who let her rule as regent during his absences from Mexico City, for which reason she is considered the first woman to rule in the Americas. When Napoleon III ordered the withdrawal of French military aid intended to support Maximilian, the situation of the Mexican imperial couple became untenable.

On her own initiative, Charlotte decided to go personally to Europe in order to attempt a final approach to Paris and the Vatican. She landed in France in August 1866, but suffered the successive refusals of both Napoleon III and Pope Pius IX. In Rome, the failure of her mission appeared to compromise her mental health to the point that an alienist doctor advocated the confinement of Charlotte in Miramare Castle. It was during her stay under house arrest that Maximilian was deposed and executed under Benito Juárez in June 1867. Unaware that she was a widow, Charlotte was brought back to Belgium and confined successively in the Pavilion of Tervuren (in 1867 and again during 1869–1879), the Palace of Laeken (during 1867–1869) and finally at Bouchout Castle in Meise (from 1879), where she remained for the next 48 years in a deleterious mental state, giving rise to much speculation ever since, before dying in 1927 aged 86.

== Life ==
=== Birth and early years ===
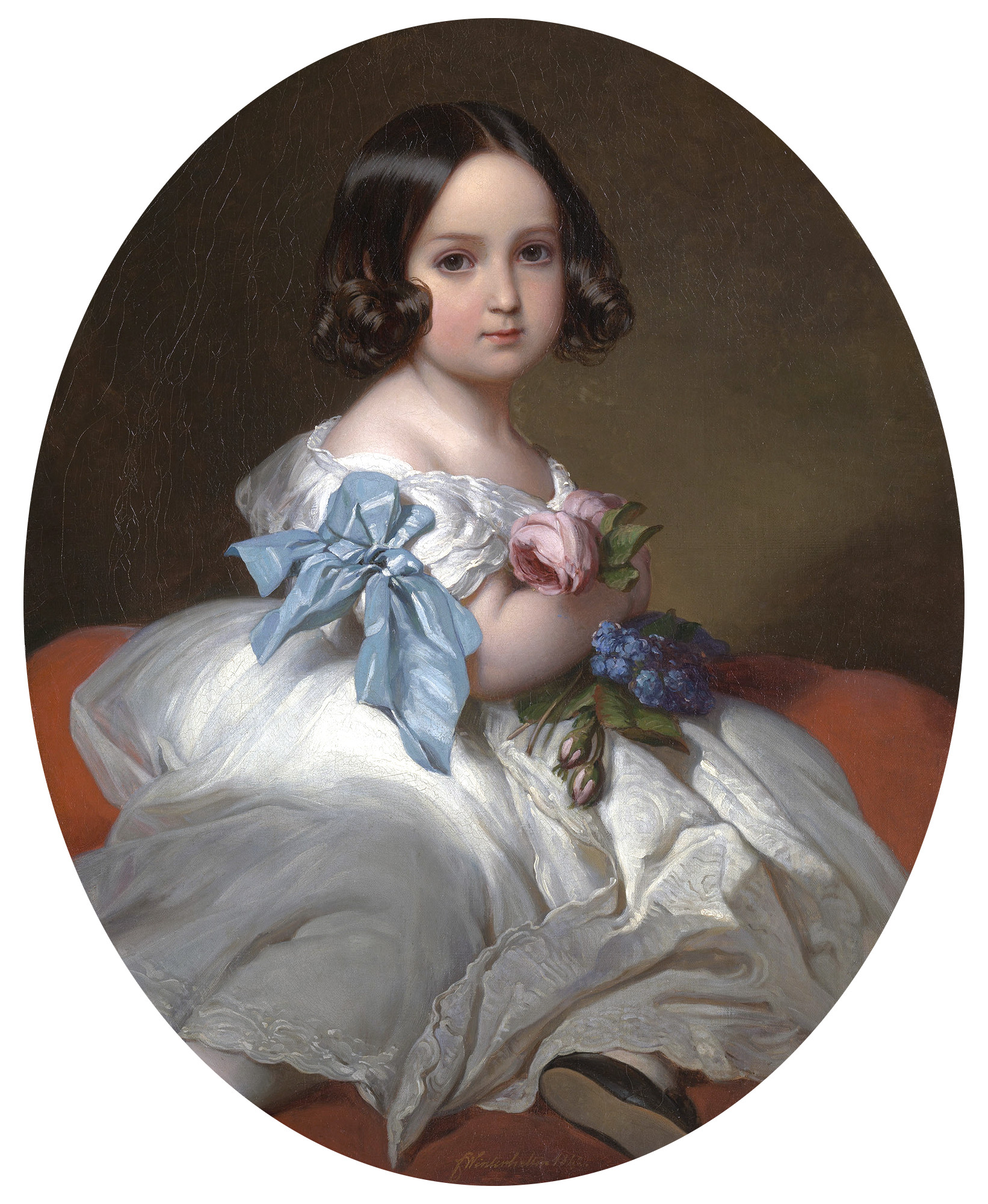
Charlotte as a young girl, portrait by Franz Xaver Winterhalter, 1842.

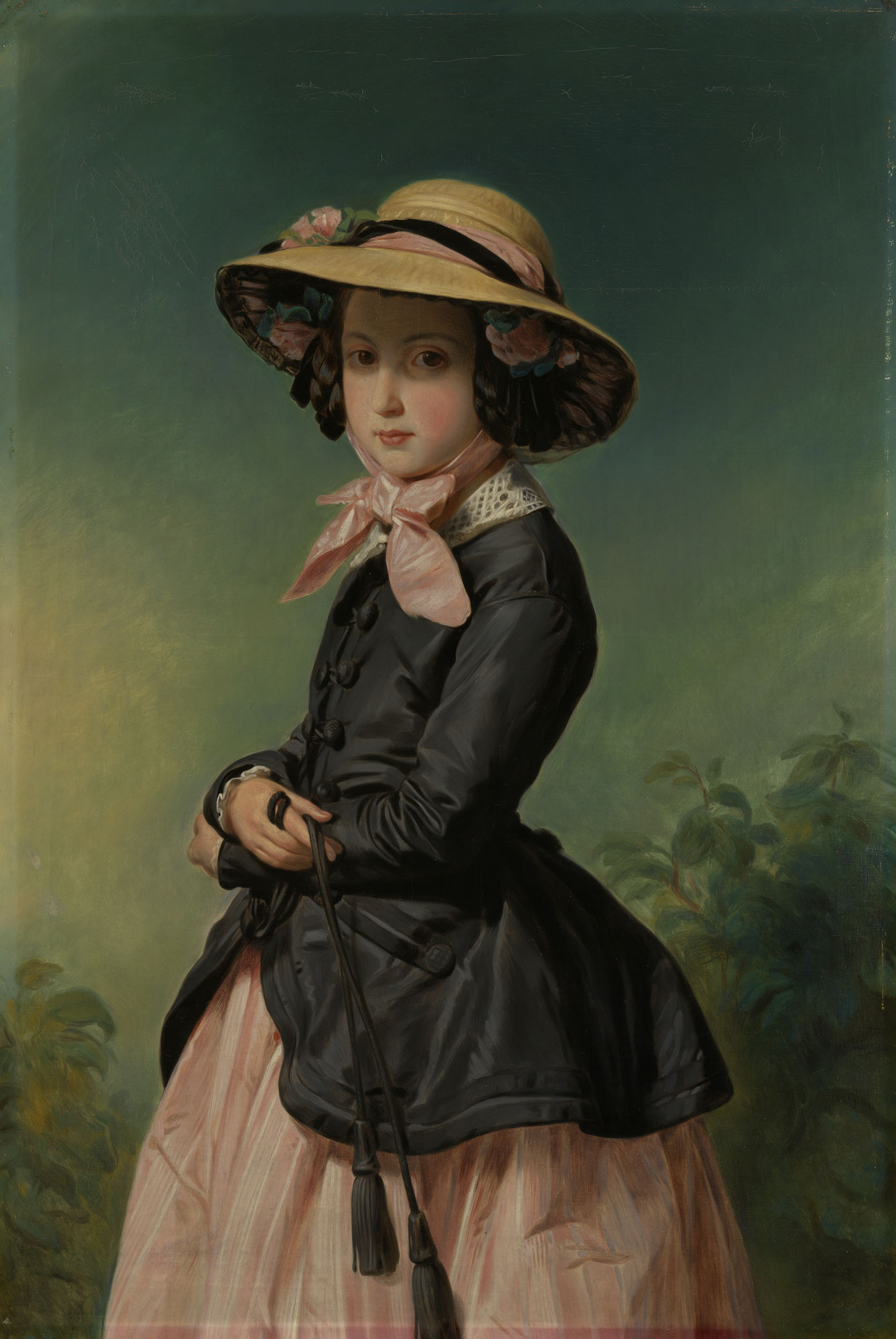
Charlotte in 1848 (portrait by Hermann Winterhalter)

Marie Charlotte Amélie Augustine Victoire Clémentine Léopoldine of Saxe-Coburg and Gotha, better known under the name Charlotte, was the daughter of Leopold I of Belgium and Louise of Orléans. Her first name pays homage to the late Princess Charlotte of Wales, her father's first wife. She was the fourth and last child and the only daughter of the Belgian royal couple, after Louis-Philippe (who died less than one year old in 1834), Leopold (born in 1835) and Philippe (born in 1837). Queen Louise's last pregnancy was so difficult there were fears of a miscarriage in April, but on 7 June 1840 at 1 a.m., Charlotte was born healthy at the Palace of Laeken. Initially disappointed by the birth of a daughter, who was not a dynast in Belgium at that time, King Leopold I was gradually charmed by his daughter, who became in time his favorite child. Through her mother, Charlotte was a granddaughter of Louis Philippe I and Maria Amalia of the Two Sicilies, King and Queen of the French and through her father, she was a first-cousin of Queen Victoria of the United Kingdom of Great Britain and Ireland; thanks to these relations, and in addition to regular stays in the city of Ostend in the summer, Charlotte spent long holidays with her maternal grandparents in the French royal residences and at her cousin's in Windsor Castle. She was close to her maternal grandmother, Queen Maria Amalia, and the two regularly corresponded; after the French Revolution of 1848 which dethroned her grandparents and exiled them to England, for a few weeks out of the year, Charlotte stayed in Claremont with her mother's family in exile.

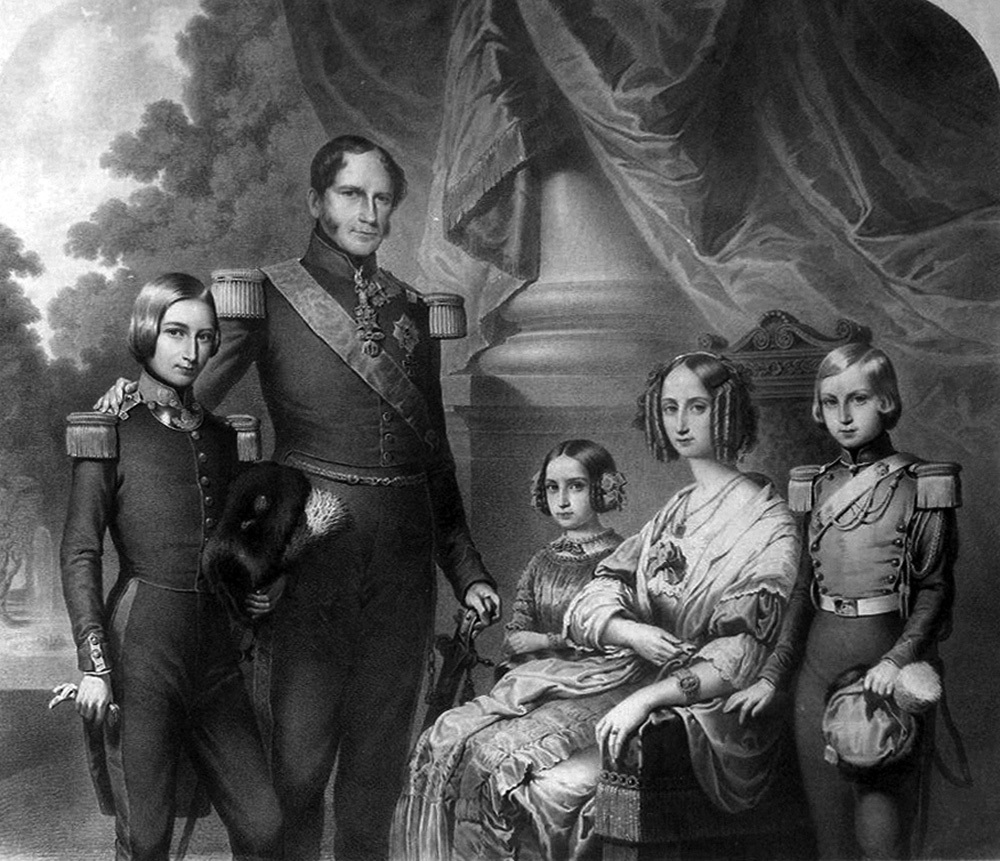
Leopold I of Belgium and his family, by Charles Baugniet, c. 1850.

When her mother died on 11 October 1850, Charlotte was only 10 years old. The boisterous and expansive little girl quickly became a pensive and introverted teenager. The late Queen Louise had personally overseen the education and instruction of the royal children. Respecting the wishes of his deceased wife, the King appointed Countess Denise d'Hulst, a French aristocrat, to take particular care of Charlotte, of whom she became governess. Fleeing Laeken as soon as he could, Leopold I had little presence with his children, who suffered as a result. Very early on, Charlotte was able to express herself orally and in writing in French, English and German. Her religious instruction was entrusted to Victor-Auguste-Isidor Deschamps, later Cardinal and Archbishop of Mechelen and therefore Primate of Belgium. Religion held a major place in the life of the princess.

Leopold I demanded that his children carry out frequent examinations of conscience, believing that crowned heads must possess great strength of character. After Madame d'Hulst returned to France, it was Countess Marie-Auguste de Bovée, her new governess, who educated Charlotte, urging her to read and meditate daily on The Imitation of Christ. At the age of 13, her favorite author was Plutarch, while she judged Ovid to be childish. Very early on, she was convinced that royalty would have to be more accountable to God than the rest of humanity. Her obsession with learning made society bland, she wrote at 15. At this age, Charlotte was seen as a distant beauty, aware of her dignity and seeking to achieve unattainable moral perfection. She had a tendency to judge those around her harshly and got along more with her brother Philippe than with Leopold.

Charlotte possessed professional proficiency in Spanish, French, English, and Italian.

=== Marriage ===
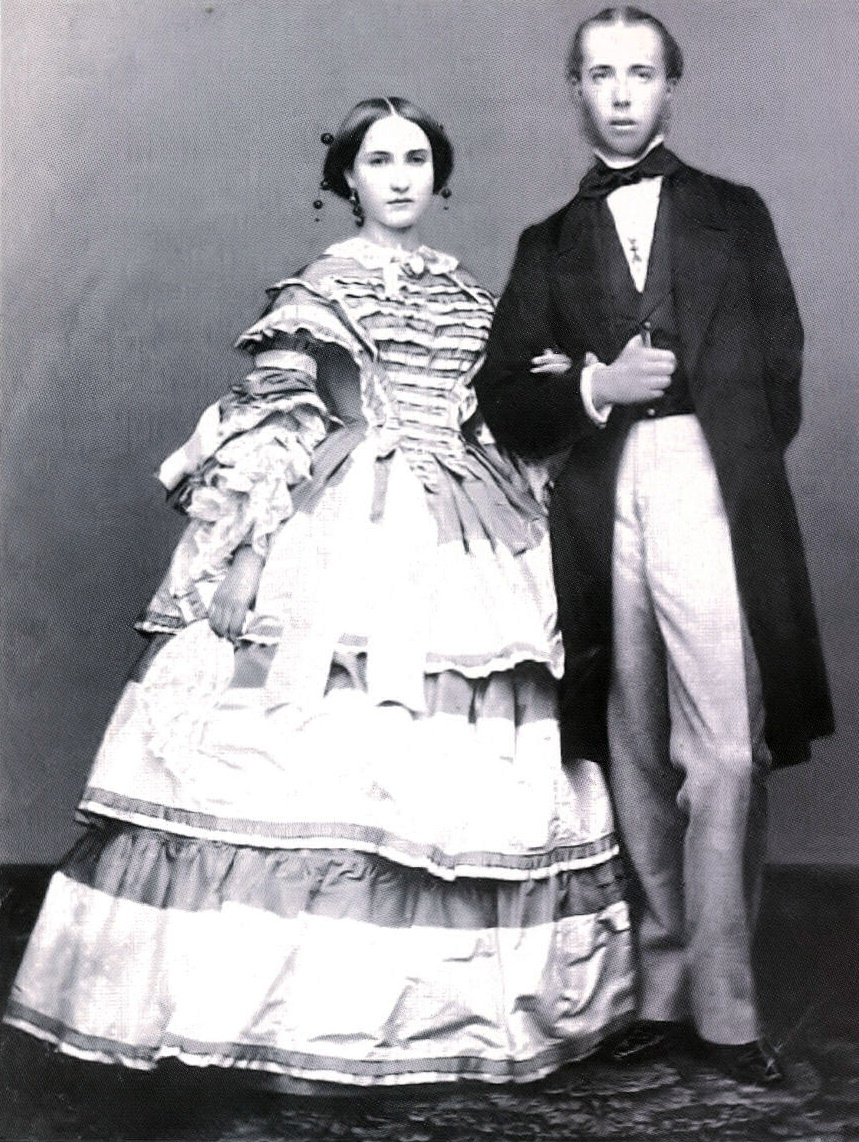
Charlotte of Belgium and her fiancé Maximilian. Photography by Louis-Joseph Ghémar 1857.

In her youth, Charlotte resembled her mother, and was noted as being a beauty possessing delicate features. This, combined with her status as the only daughter of the King of the Belgians, made her a desirable match. In 1856, as she was preparing to celebrate her sixteenth birthday, two suitors sought her hand: Prince George of Saxony (who was quickly rejected) and King Pedro V of Portugal. The latter was the favorite candidate of both Queen Victoria and King Leopold I. By personal choice, and under the influence of Madame d'Hulst (who affirmed that at the Portuguese court no priest would understand her), Charlotte declined the offer of marriage with King Pedro V. She explained: "As for Pedro, it is a throne, it is true, I would be Queen and Majesty but what is that, the crowns nowadays are heavy burdens and how one regrets later to have yielded to such crazy considerations".

In the month of May 1856, Charlotte met in Brussels with Archduke Maximilian of Austria, younger brother of Emperor Franz Joseph I. She was immediately charmed by this prince who was eight years her senior. Reportedly she stated: "it will be him that I will marry". Her father left Charlotte the choice of her future husband; as she testified in a letter addressed to her grandmother Maria Amalia: "He wrote me the most impartial letter, putting before my eyes the advantages of one and the other without wanting to influence me in any way". As for Leopold I, he wrote to his future son-in-law: "You won in May [...] all my confidence and my benevolence. I also noticed that my little girl shared these dispositions; however it was my duty to proceed with precaution". Charlotte declared: "If, as it is in question, the Archduke was invested with the Viceroyalty of Italy, that would be charming, that's all I want". The official engagement was celebrated on 23 December 1856.

Charlotte appeared elated by the prospect of her marriage to Maximilian, praising a fiancé for whom she envisioned an exceptional destiny. Maximilian appeared less enthusiastic when negotiating the dowry of his bride. The Archduke said of his fiancée: "She's short, I'm tall, which must be. She's brunette, I'm blonde, which is good too. She is very intelligent, which is a bit annoying, but I will undoubtedly get over it". The marriage ceremony was celebrated on 27 July 1857 at the Royal Palace of Brussels. This alliance with the House of Habsburg-Lorraine enhanced the legitimacy of the recently established Belgian dynasty.

Emperor Napoleon III presented the couple with a bisque bust of Charlotte as a wedding gift. In the Court of Vienna she was welcomed by her mother-in-law, Archduchess Sophie, who saw in her the perfect example of a wife for an Austrian Archduke. This contributed to the strained relationship between Charlotte and Empress Elisabeth of Austria, wife of Franz Joseph I, whom Sophie treated rather cruelly. It is said that Charlotte disliked the deep connection that existed between Elisabeth and Maximilian, who were confidantes and shared the same tastes for many things, especially because her sister-in-law was universally admired for her beauty and charm.

=== Life in Italy and Miramare ===
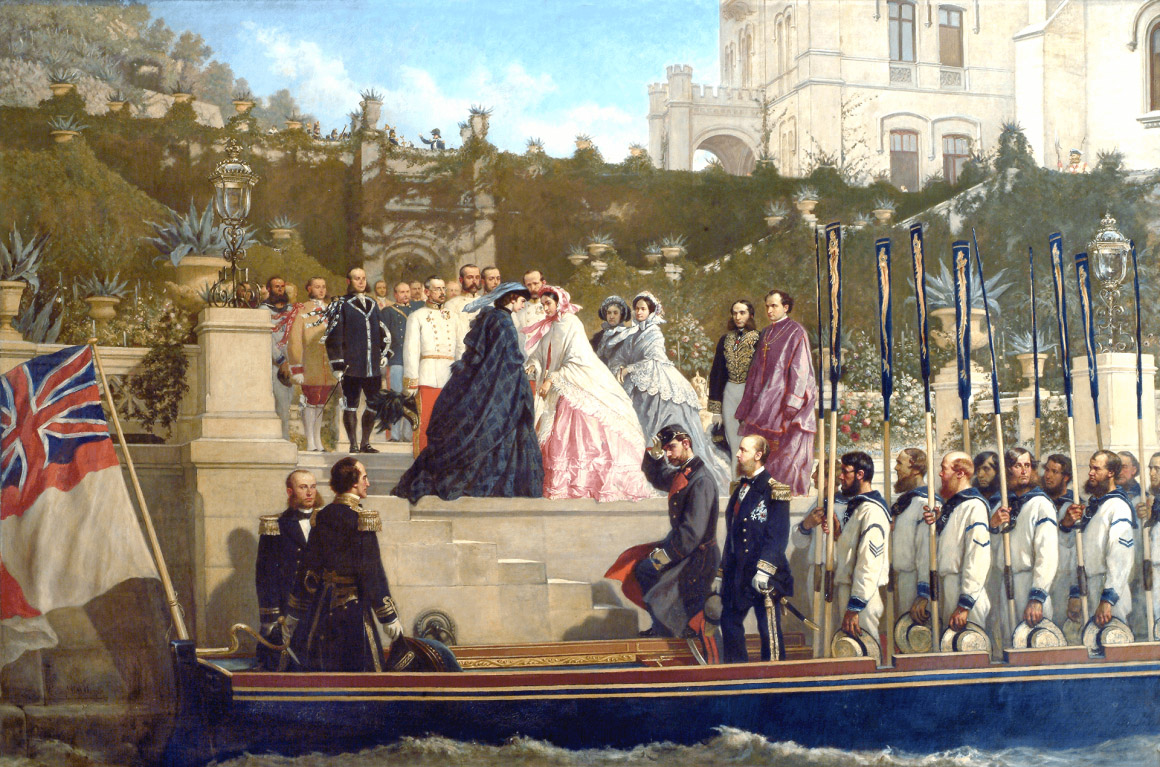
Visit of Empress Elisabeth at the Castello di Miramare in 1861, by Cesare Dell'Acqua, 1865. Charlotte (in pink dress) welcomes Elisabeth while her husband Maximilian and his brother Emperor Franz Joseph I wait on the launch of the royal British yacht HMY Victoria and Albert.

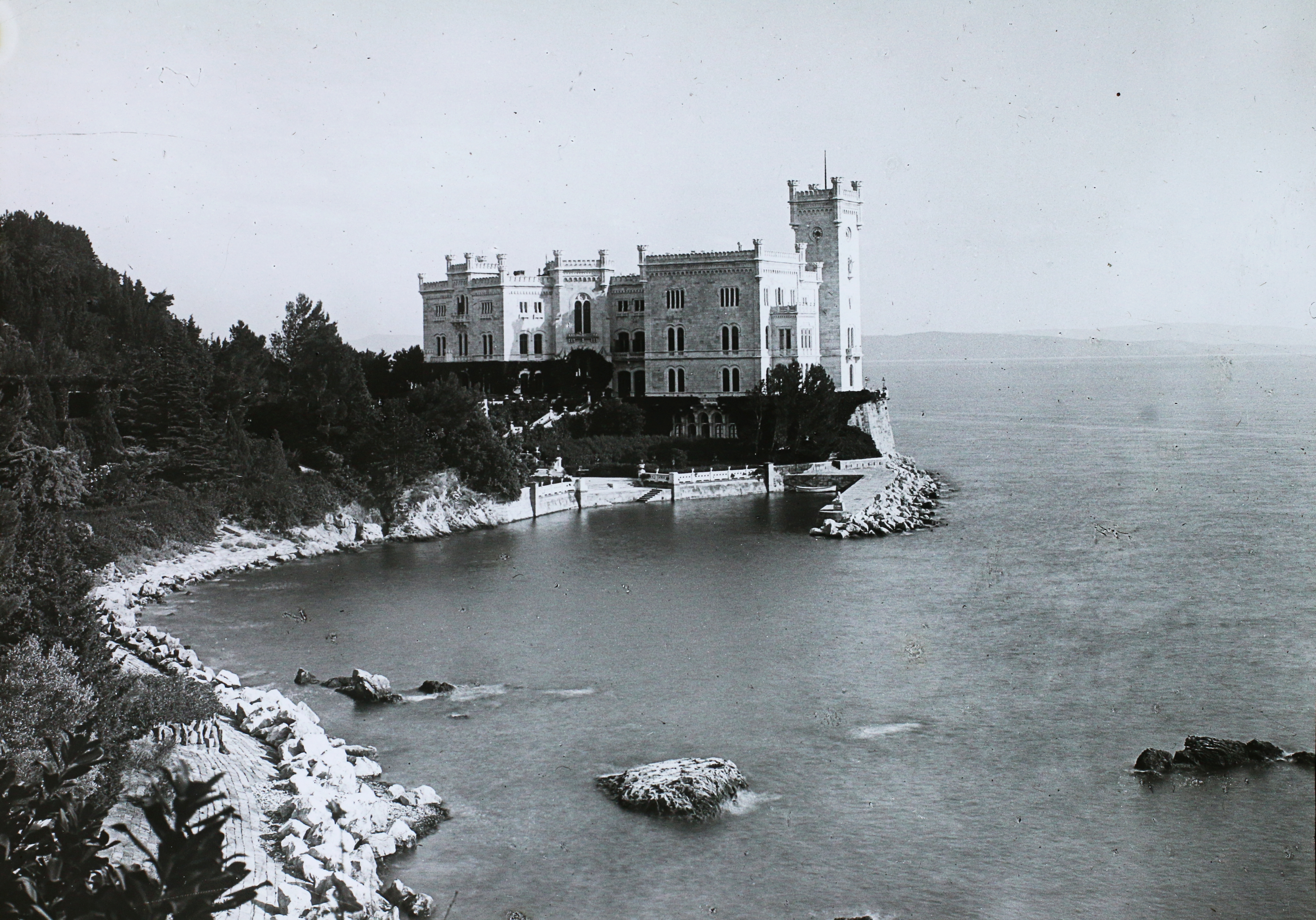
Miramare Castle at the beginning of the 20th century.

In September 1857, Emperor Franz Joseph I of Austria appointed his brother Maximilian as Viceroy of the Kingdom of Lombardy–Venetia. After a short stop in Schönbrunn, where they met the Austrian Imperial family, the newlyweds went to Maximilian's Miramare Castle where they stayed for eight days. They then visited Venice and Verona. On 6 September 1857, Charlotte and Maximilian made a solemn entry into Milan, where they were warmly welcomed. Some newspapers claimed their entry was made to appear ridiculous because of excessively ornate carriages and liveries. Leopold, Duke of Brabant, wrote to the Count of Flanders: "All the servants wore halberds! In Paris, we talked a lot about this [...]. If we sin here through too much simplicity, they are blamed for a buffoonish luxury from another time and which nowadays seems too out of place".

In Italy, the Archducal couple officially resided in Milan, seat of the government of Kingdom of Lombardy–Venetia. Sometimes staying at the Royal Palace they also spent time at the more intimate Villa of Monza. In his capacity as Viceroy, Maximilian was served by a substantial important court including chamberlains and majordomos. Charlotte was surrounded by a grand-mistress, ladies-in-waiting and a large suite. Charlotte appears to have enjoyed her time in Venice. During Easter of 1858, she and Maximilian journeyed down the Grand Canal aboard a ceremonial gondola. Charlotte also visited several charitable institutions and schools. Feasts and balls were given in their honour but the local aristocrats were conspicuous with their absences.

In 1859, Charlotte acquired the island of Lokrum and its ruined convent. She and Maximilian proceeded to transform the Benedictine abbey into a secondary residence. (Note: Charlotte kept the island of Lokrum among her personal property. Due to his sister's dementia, King Leopold II was appointed guardian and took charge of the maintenance of the property for a few years before the island of Lokrum was placed under the administration of the intendant of the imperial civil list of Austria. Then, possession of the island passed in 1880 to Rudolf, Crown Prince of Austria, only son of Emperor Franz Joseph I. After Rudolph's death, the imperial family sold the island to the House of Windisch-Graetz. Upon her marriage to Prince Otto Weriand of Windisch-Graetz in 1902, Archduchess Elisabeth Marie of Austria (Rudolf's only daughter) received the island as a wedding gift.) On a private level, Maximilian began to neglect his wife, who complained, after a year of marriage, of loneliness and boredom.

On 10 April 1859, Maximilian was obliged by his brother the Emperor to resign from his office as Viceroy of Lombardy–Venetia. He had sought to undertake reforms considered as being too liberal by the government in Vienna, as well as showing indulgence towards Italian rebels and being too much of a spendthrift.

Charlotte and Maximilian therefore retired to Miramare Castle at one end of the Gulf of Trieste. The construction of the castle continued throughout 1860, according to plans prepared by Maximilian and financed in part from Charlotte's dowry. Her brother, the future Leopold II, noted in his diary: "The construction of this palace in these days is a limitless madness". In correspondence Charlotte painted an idyllic portrait of this time in Miramare, though the estrangement of the two spouses appeared to become more marked. Charlotte practiced horseback riding, painting and swimming. She played a major part in planning the layout and statuary of the extensive gardens of Miramare, while contributing some of her own paintings to the gallery of the palace.

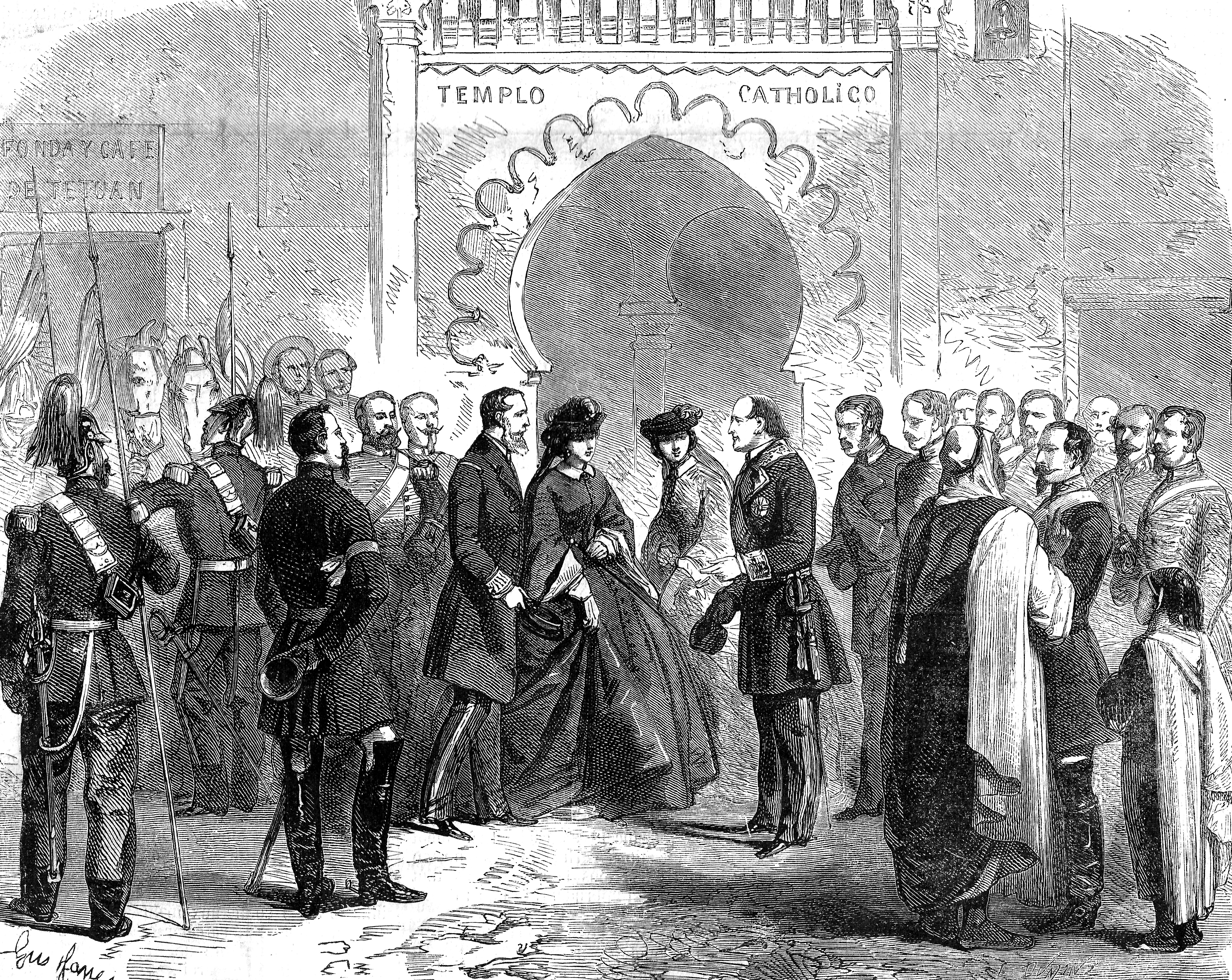
Maximilian and Charlotte visiting Tétouan in March 1860. Engraving by Gustave Janet.

In December 1859 Charlotte and Maximilian embarked on a voyage aboard the yacht Fantasia, which took them to Madeira in December 1859, on the spot where Princess Maria Amélia of Brazil, once engaged to Maximilian, had died six years previously. In this place, the Archduke experienced intense regret and melancholic thoughts. Charlotte remained alone in Funchal for three months while her husband continued his journey to Brazil, where he visited three states: first Bahia, then Rio de Janeiro and finally Espírito Santo. On his return from his trip, Maximilian returned via Funchal where he and Charlotte prepared to return to Trieste. First they made a stopover in Tétouan, where they docked on 18 March 1860.

On 3 October 1863, a delegation of conservative Mexican notables arrived at Miramare Castle to formally offer the Archduke the crown of their country. They were mostly reactionary expatriates who were resident in Europe and enjoyed only limited support in their native country. In reality, negotiations on this subject had been underway for more than two years: Emperor Napoleon III envisaged creating a "Latin and Catholic" satellite state in Mexico, which would limit the influence of the United States of America, then in the grip of the Civil War. He was encouraged in this project by the prospect of recovering French investments and loans put at risk by the chaotic political situation in Mexico. With Papal support he accordingly searched for a suitable figurehead to serve as the nominal emperor of Mexico. His choice was Maximilian, who no longer held any power in the Austrian-ruled parts of northern Italy and was eager for a more challenging role. The Emperor of the French promised to support Maximilian militarily if he agreed to leave for Mexico. However, Maximilian hesitated and was slow to agree to this venture. Emperor Franz Joseph I was ambivalent to the proposal and his ministers questioned its wisdom. Maximilian made his assent subject to ratification by the Mexican people. The strong-willed Charlotte believed that restoring the Mexican crown would constitute a mission to bring order and civilization under the House of Habsburg, who would once again rule an empire where the sun never sets; she argued decisively to overcome her husband's doubts. Maximilian accepted the Mexican crown and the couple prepared for their trip for the New World.

=== Empress of Mexico ===
==== Departure for Mexico ====
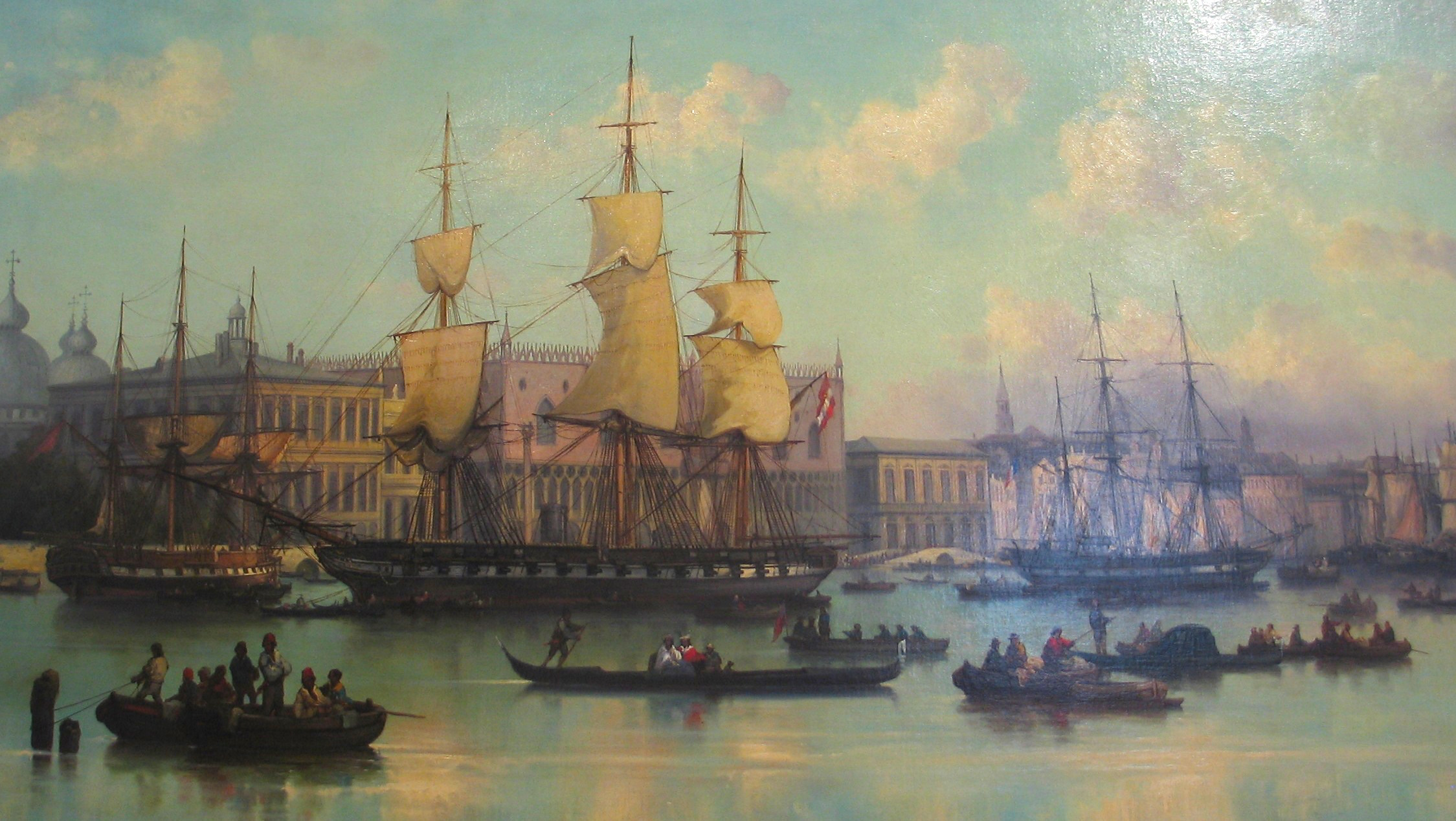
The frigate SMS Novara, by Josef Püttner, after 1862.

On 10 April 1864, in a state apartment of Miramare Castle, Maximilian and Charlotte were informally proclaimed as Emperor and Empress of Mexico. He affirmed that the wishes of the Mexican people allowed him to consider himself as the legitimate elected representative of the people. In reality, the Archduke was persuaded by a few Mexican conservatives who incorrectly assured him of massive popular support. For supporting documents, the Mexican deputation produced "acts of adhesion" containing population numbers for localities within Mexico that were purportedly surveyed. Maximilian instructed the delegation "to ensure by all means the well-being, prosperity, independence and integrity of this nation".

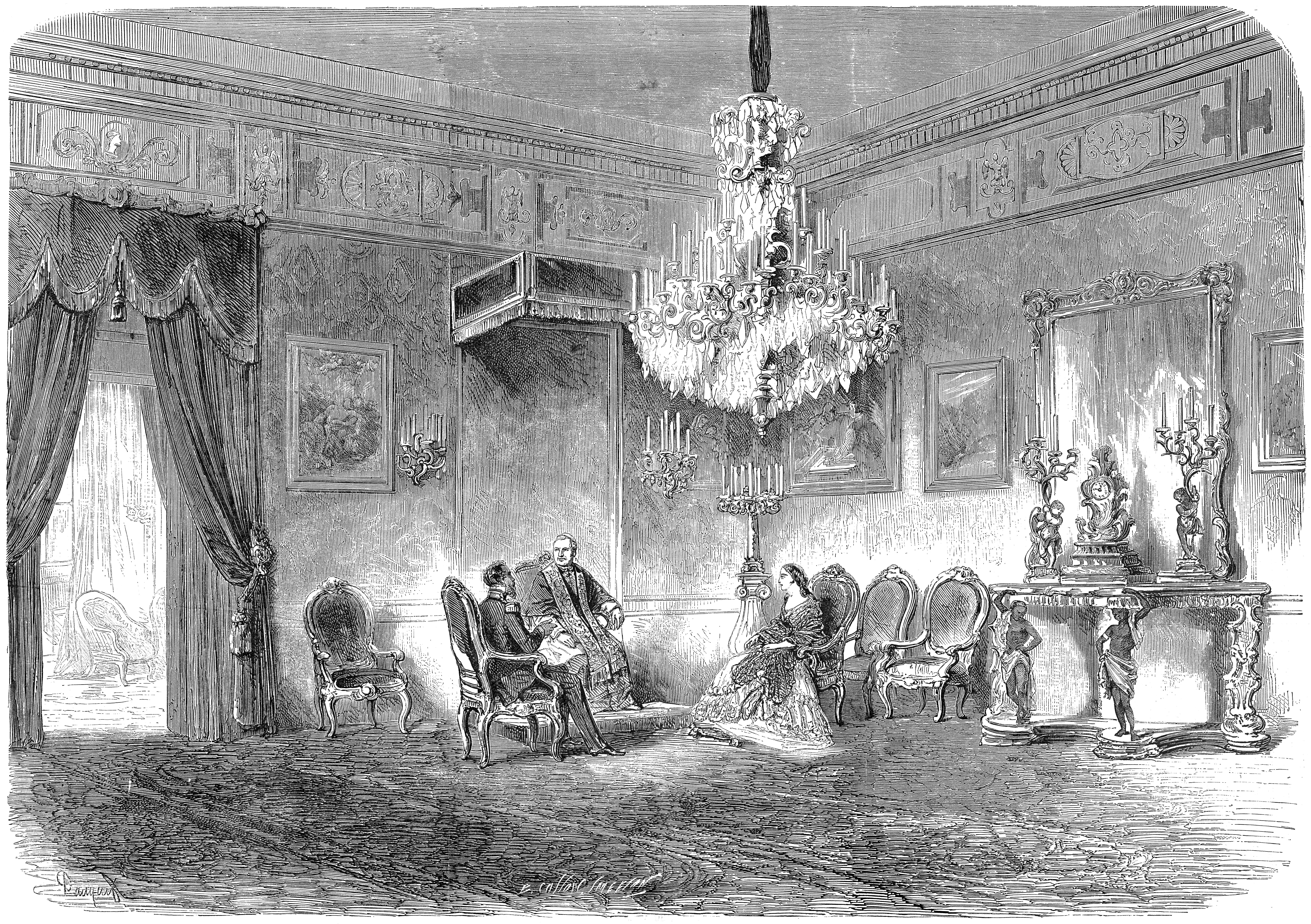
Audience of Maximilian and Charlotte with Pope Pius IX on 19 April 1864. Engraving by Ferdinand Laufberger.

The same evening, an official dinner was planned at Miramare in the large salon at Les Mouettes. Now on the verge of a nervous breakdown, Maximilian retired to his apartments, where he was examined by his doctor August von Jilek, who found the new Emperor prostrate and so overwhelmed that the doctor instructed him to rest in the garden house of the estate. Charlotte therefore presided at the banquet alone. The departure for Mexico was set for 14 April. Once on board the Austrian frigate SMS Novara and escorted by the French frigate Thémis, Maximilian became more serene. He and Charlotte made a stopover in Rome to receive the blessing of Pope Pius IX. On 19 April, during the pontifical audience at the Palace of Maffei Marescotti, the subject of the recovery of church property confiscated by the Mexican republican government was avoided. However, the Pope stressed that Maximilian would have to respect the rights of the Church.

During the long crossing, Charlotte and Maximilian rarely discussed the serious diplomatic and political difficulties which they were to be confronted with in Mexico. Instead, they spent their time preparing the etiquette of their future court in great detail. They began to write a 600-page manuscript relating to ceremonial functions, regulating protocol in its most minute aspects. The SMS Novara stopped in Madeira and Jamaica. The ships encountered heavy thunderstorms before a final stopover was made in Martinique. With the port of Veracruz in front of her, Charlotte wrote to her grandmother: "In a few hours we will touch the ground of our new homeland...I am delighted with the Tropics and I only dream of butterflies and hummingbirds [...] I would never have believed that in what regards the regions where we are going to live, my wishes were also completely fulfilled".

==== Reign ====
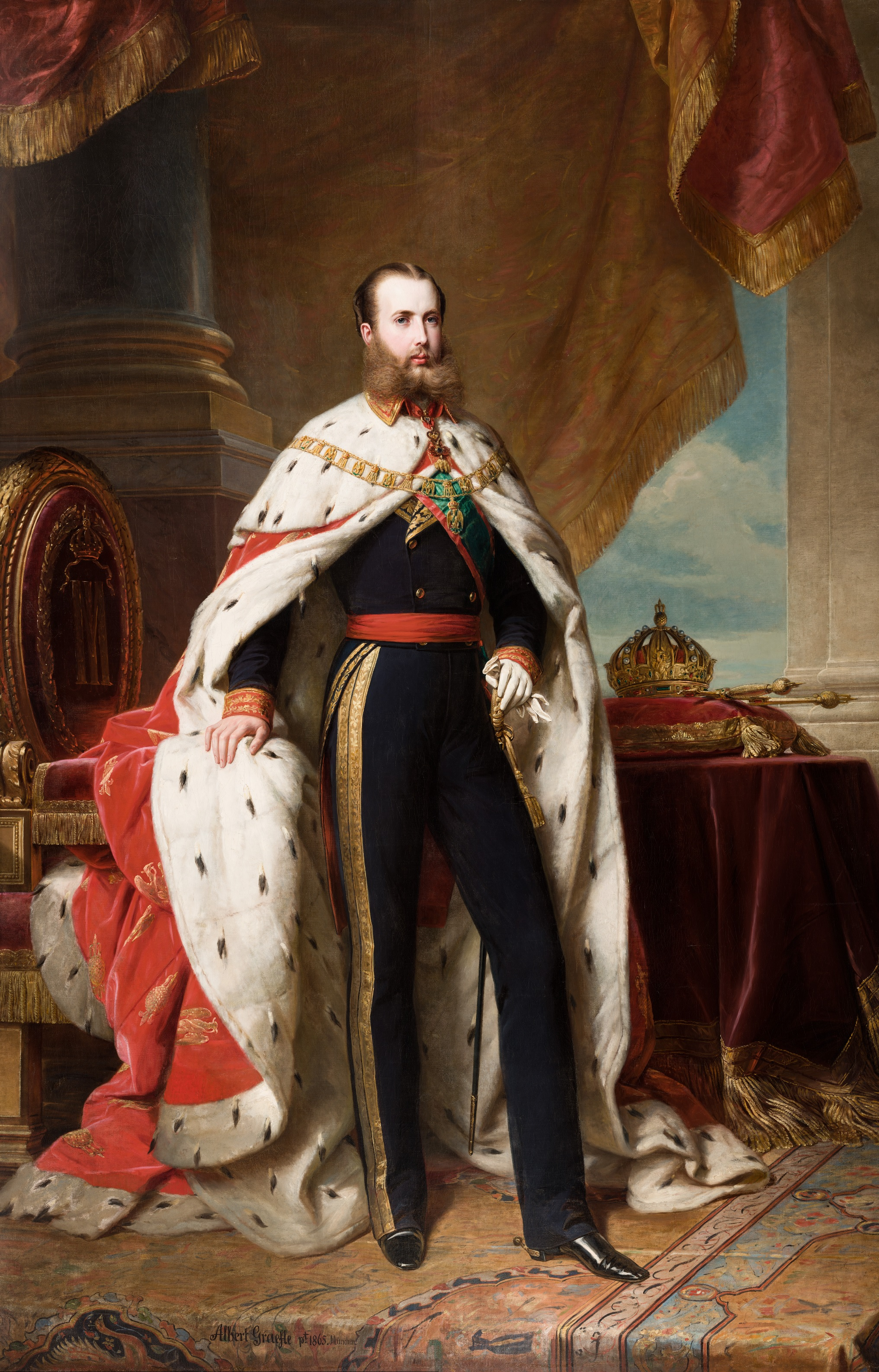
Portraits of Emperor Maximilian and Empress Charlotte of Mexico by Albert Gräfle, 1865, which hang in Chapultepec Castle, Mexico City.

Maximilian and Charlotte arrived at the port of Veracruz on 28 May 1864 and made entry into Mexico City on 12 June with a warm welcome. Unimpressed by the National Palace, which required major refurbishment, they preferred Chapultepec Castle as their new Imperial residence. They also chose the Palace of Cortés in Cuernavaca as a summer residence. Shortly after their arrival in Mexico, they commenced costly improvements to their various properties and surroundings, despite the Mexican treasury being in a critical condition. Charlotte took a leading role in the various festivals, military parades, balls and theatrical performances presented in their honour. She also presided over the newly created Mexican Imperial Order of Saint Charles, or 'Orden Imperial de San Carlos', designed to reward charitable or other service to the Mexican nation.

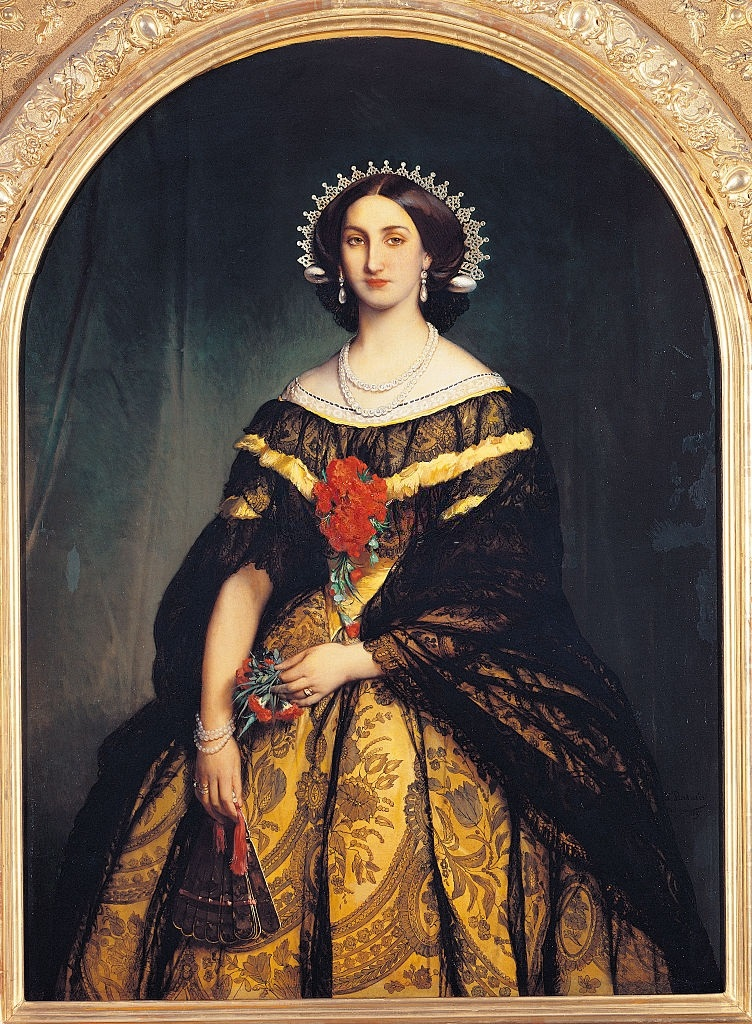
Portrait of Archduchess Carlotta in Brianza costume by Jean-François Portaels

Despite the idyllic descriptions of Mexico that Maximilian and Charlotte wrote to their relatives in Europe, it did not take long for them to realize the insecurity and disorder which plagued their Empire. Their residences were perpetually monitored by a large armed guard intended to push back the rebel bands which roamed nearby. French intervention, supported by the Belgian and Austrian contingents and local Mexican Imperial troops, was followed by a long civil war which disrupted every aspect of Mexican life. The approximately 30,000 to 40,000 soldiers of the French expeditionary force, led by Marshal Bazaine, had to counter multiple skirmishes led by the guerrillas over a territory four times larger than that of France.

A conservative minority of the Mexican people supported the Second Mexican Empire, along with the Mexican nobility, clergy, and some native groups. The Emperor tried in vain to reconcile the liberal and conservative parties. He decided to pursue a liberal policy by approving the secularization of ecclesiastical property for the benefit of the national domain, which alienated the conservatives and the clergy. When he was absent from Mexico City, sometimes for several months, Maximilian appointed Charlotte as Regent: she presided over the Council of Ministers and gave public audiences on Sundays. The popularity of the sovereigns was already dwindling before the end of the first year of their reign.

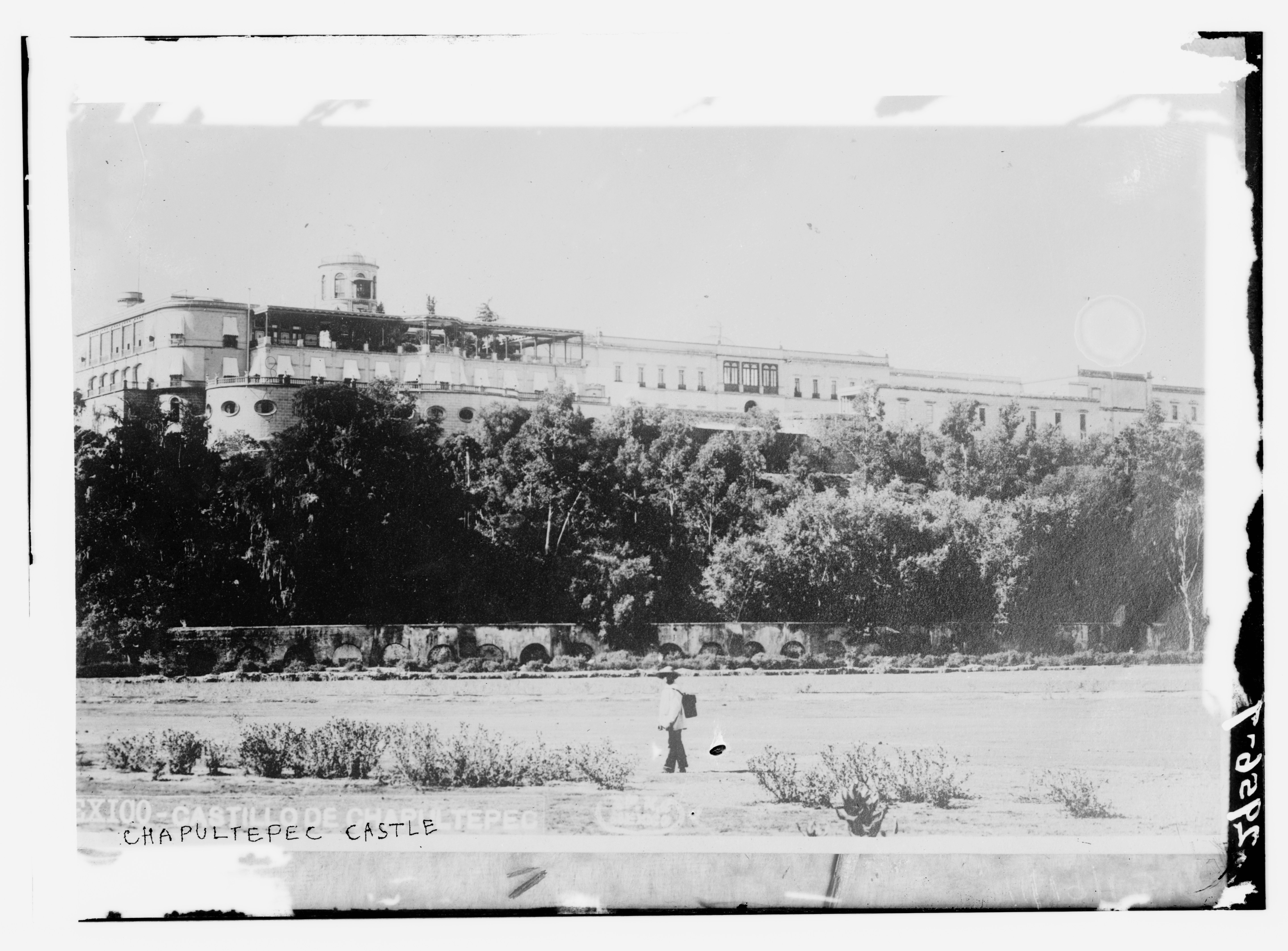
Chapultepec Castle in the beginning of 20th century.

Without a child from his marriage, Maximilian, to Charlotte's disapproval, decided in September 1865 to adopt Agustín de Iturbide y Green and Salvador de Iturbide y de Marzán, grandsons of Agustín I de Iturbide, an earlier Emperor of Mexico (r. 1822–1823). Agustín was only two years old when he was adopted and was forcibly separated from his mother, under Maximilian's orders. This situation upset Charlotte, who was forced by her husband to go and fetch the child herself from his biological parents. By this point, public opinion of Maximilian was almost unanimously negative. He gave Agustín de Iturbide y Green the title of "His Highness, The Prince of Iturbide" and similar imperial titles were accorded to various members of the child's extended family. He also ensured that the secret treaty between him and the House of Iturbide was published in European newspapers, which prevented Charlotte or anyone else from being able to attempt a reversal of the adoption. Despite these actions, it appears Maximilian never intended to give Agustín or Salvador the throne, because they were not of royal blood. He himself explained that it was all a charade to convince his younger brother Archduke Karl Ludwig of Austria to give him one of his sons to act as heir.

A year after the arrival of Maximilian and Charlotte, the situation in Mexico remained unstable. Charlotte wrote: "As disaster does not come alone, the interior continues to be ravaged. Bands emerge as if from underground where there was none before". The perpetual question of financing caused relations between France and Mexico to deteriorate. The Republicans of former Mexican President Benito Juárez began to enlist men and arms from the United States of America, where the Civil War had just concluded. The Belgian Legion, composed of 4,000 men, was roundly defeated by the Juarist troops at the Battle of Tacámbaro (11 April 1865), but won the Battle of la Loma (16 July 1865) under the command of Lieutenant-Colonel (later General) Alfred van der Smissen.

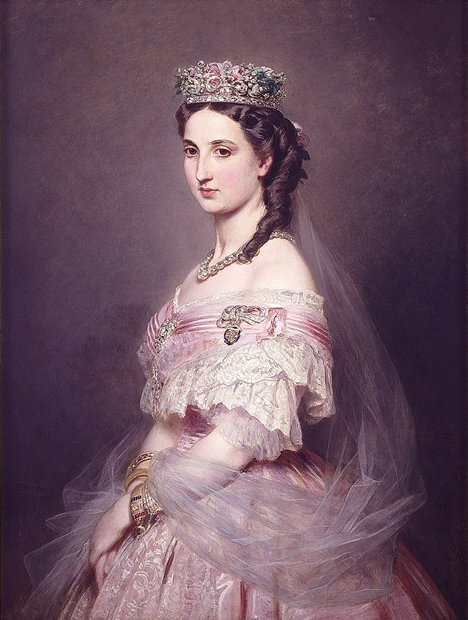
Charlotte of Belgium, Empress of Mexico in 1864 (painting by Franz Xaver Winterhalter)

Faced with this complex situation, Maximilian resolved, under pressure from Marshal Bazaine and the French army, to adopt a policy of harsh repression against the rebels. He published the "Black Decree" on 3 October 1865, which, while promising an amnesty to the dissidents who surrendered, declared in its first article: "All individuals belonging to bands or armed gatherings existing without legal authorization, whether or not they proclaim a political pretext [...] will be tried militarily by the martial courts. If they are guilty, even though it is only the mere fact of belonging to an armed gang, they will be condemned to death and the sentence will be executed in 24 hours". Under this decree, several hundred rebels and political opponents were summarily executed.

==== Trip to Yucatán ====
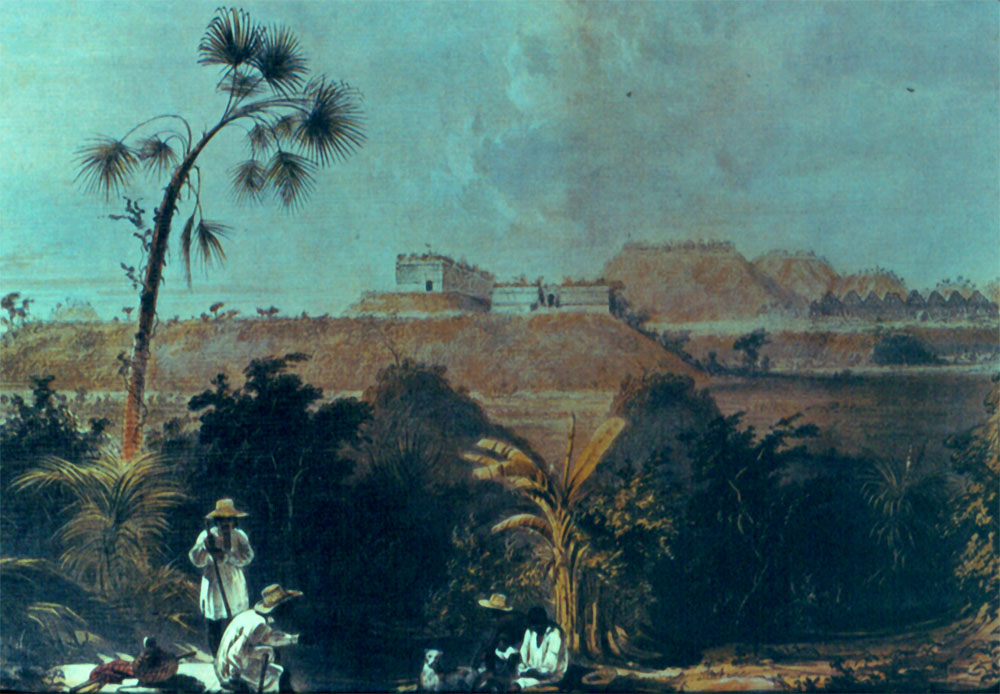
Uxmal in the 19th century

On 6 November 1865, Charlotte began an official visit to the remote province of Yucatán, which lasted almost two months. Without Maximilian, but accompanied by an imposing retinue, she departed on the Tabasco, a ship in poor condition whose pitching made the crossing of the Gulf of Mexico very difficult. Yucatán, far from the tragic events that bloodied the rest of Mexico, gave a relatively warm welcome to the Empress. This trip commenced with a succession of festivities preceding her arrival in Mérida, capital of the province. Charlotte then took the opportunity to visit the ruins of the ancient Maya city of Uxmal, where she admired the archaeological curiosities. While there, she wrote a series of letters and reports on the peninsula that are now archived in the National Archives of Austria and the Library of Congress. When Charlotte met Maximilian again in Cuernavaca, the day before New Year's Day 1866, he informed her of the new legislative projects he had conceived. Charlotte and her husband stayed for a few days in Cuernavaca, where on the morning of 6 January, she learned of the death of her father King Leopold I of Belgium almost four weeks before. Two months later, on 24 March, Charlotte heard that her maternal grandmother Maria Amalia, Dowager Queen consort of the French; to whom she was deeply attached, had died in England.

==== Departure from Mexico ====
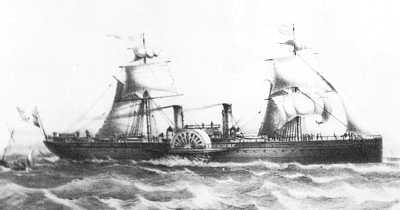
The Impératrice Éugenie in 1864.

In January 1866, Emperor Napoleon III, influenced by French public hostility to the Mexican expedition, decided to begin the withdrawal of his troops supporting the Imperial cause in Mexico. This strategic pullback was a potentially fatal blow to the infant Mexican monarchy; at the end of the withdrawal of the French expeditionary force, Maximilian would only have the support of a small force of imperial Mexican soldiers and a contingent of Belgian and Austrian volunteers, which were easily outnumbered by rebel forces. The announcement of the French withdrawal encouraged the Belgian legation to leave the country. In a desperate attempt to save her husband's throne, Charlotte resolved to personally persuade Napoleon III to reconsider his decision. On 9 July 1866, Charlotte, with Maximilian's concurrence, set sail for Europe from the port of Veracruz upon the transatlantic ocean liner Impératrice Eugénie. She was accompanied by Martín del Castillo y Cos, Minister of Foreign Affairs, and her two adoptive sons, the Princes of Iturbide.

Subsequently, a rumor circulated that Charlotte, shortly before her trip to Europe, had become pregnant by her aide-de-camp Alfred van der Smissen and had given birth to a son in early 1867. The feasibility of this rumor is uncertain. (Note: The proponents of this view pointed to a child born in Brussels on 23 January 1867 and declared of unknown parentage as Charlotte's illegitimate child, but this date of birth did not coincide with Charlotte's presence in Brussels (she had been confined to Miramare since October 1866 where she stayed until July 1867). This son would become the future French general Maxime Weygand. As an adult, Weygand did indeed share a certain physical resemblance to Alfred van der Smissen, which some took as evidence of Empress Charlotte and van der Smissen's affair. This theory was disproved by Dominique Paoli and presented in a television program by Alain Decaux. Historian André Castelot, revealed that King Leopold III of Belgium had personally confirmed to him that "Weygand is the son of van der Smissen". King Leopold II of Belgium (for whom van der Smissen would later become aide-de-camp) provided protection for the child from a distance, providing funds which enabled him to be adopted by a family in Nimal, and then by the French Weygand family. Paoli claimed to have found evidence that Maxime Weygand was the illegitimate child of Alfred van der Smissen and Princess Melanie Marie von Metternich-Winneburg zu Beilstein, Charlotte's lady-in-waiting and daughter of Austrian diplomat and politician Prince Klemens von Metternich. Paoli further claimed that Weygand had been born in mid-1865, not January 1867 as is generally claimed.)

=== Return to Europe ===
On 8 August 1866, Empress Charlotte arrived in Europe with her two adoptive sons and Martín del Castillo, at the harbour of Saint-Nazaire, where they were greeted by Juan Almonte and his wife, instead of an official welcoming ceremony. From there, she took a train for Paris, where she arrived on 9 August. During the trip, Charlotte had received a telegraph from Napoleon III, informing her that he was terribly ill, but this did little to dissuade her. At the Château de Saint-Cloud, the bedridden Napoleon III received a telegram from Charlotte requesting an interview. He first sent his wife Empress Eugénie to the Le Grand Hôtel where Charlotte was staying, hoping to deter the determined Empress of Mexico from her plans to meet him in person. But Charlotte could not be dissuaded and Eugénie made arrangements for a first meeting between the two of them the next day, 11 August, at Saint-Cloud.

Despite carefully preparing her arguments in a twenty-page brief, the meeting between Charlotte and Napoleon III ended in complete failure. She gave a long, impassioned speech reminding Napoleon III of his promises and the Treaty of Miramar, but the Emperor was unwavering in his position, affirming that he could not decide anything without the approval of his ministers and that he refused to negotiate new financial and military guarantees in favour of Mexico. Her mission ruined, Charlotte began manifesting symptoms of paranoia and had profound cognitive and emotional collapse. Two days later, she returned to Saint-Cloud to attempt another negotiation with Napoleon III. A lively discussion broke out in the presence of Empress Eugénie, who sank into an armchair, pretending to faint. The first signs of Charlotte's mental breakdown became evident here, when, overwhelmed by sadness, she threw herself into a nearby armchair, sobbing hysterically. The Council of Ministers of 18 August 1866 confirmed the position of Napoleon III and formally opposed maintaining any military presence by France in Mexico. On 19 August, Napoleon III went personally to Le Grand Hôtel for a third and final meeting with Charlotte, to confirm to her that France would no longer continue to act in Mexico.

Shaken by Napoleon III's refusal, on 21 August Charlotte left France for Miramare Castle in Trieste; on the journey there, her mental health showed signs of worsening – passing by a farmer, she became convinced that he was an assassin. She persistently shouted at her coachman to drive faster. She avoided going through Brussels (Note: The Moniteur belge wrongly assures: "Brussels, 14 August 1866. H.M. the Empress of Mexico is expected from time to time in Brussels. It is assured that the August traveler expressed the desire that no official honor be returned on her arrival and on her departure".) and Vienna due to the withdrawal of the Belgian and Austrian troops from Mexico, and Charlotte did not seek help from either her or her husband's families. Charlotte's late father, King Leopold I, had been doubtful of the Mexican adventure, and his son, now Leopold II, while once a staunch supporter of his sister's ambitions, could no longer ignore the hostility of the Belgians towards further involvement in Mexico, especially in view of the significant losses incurred there by the Belgian Legion. Charlotte was now isolated and could no longer count on further European support.

Once at Miramare, Charlotte found a message from Maximilian waiting for her, imploring her to seek an audience with Pope Pius IX in Rome. After a one-month stay in Trieste, Charlotte left for the Vatican to try and win continuing support from the pontiff for the Imperial regime in Mexico. Pope Pius IX, however, saw no reason to further implicate the Church in the disastrous Mexican venture. On her way to Rome, Charlotte showed further signs of deteriorating mental health; while stopping for the night at the city of Bolzano (German: Bozen) in South Tyrol, then part of the Austrian Empire, Charlotte informed Martín del Castillo that she felt unwell and insisted that it was due to being poisoned by spies and traitors among her party.

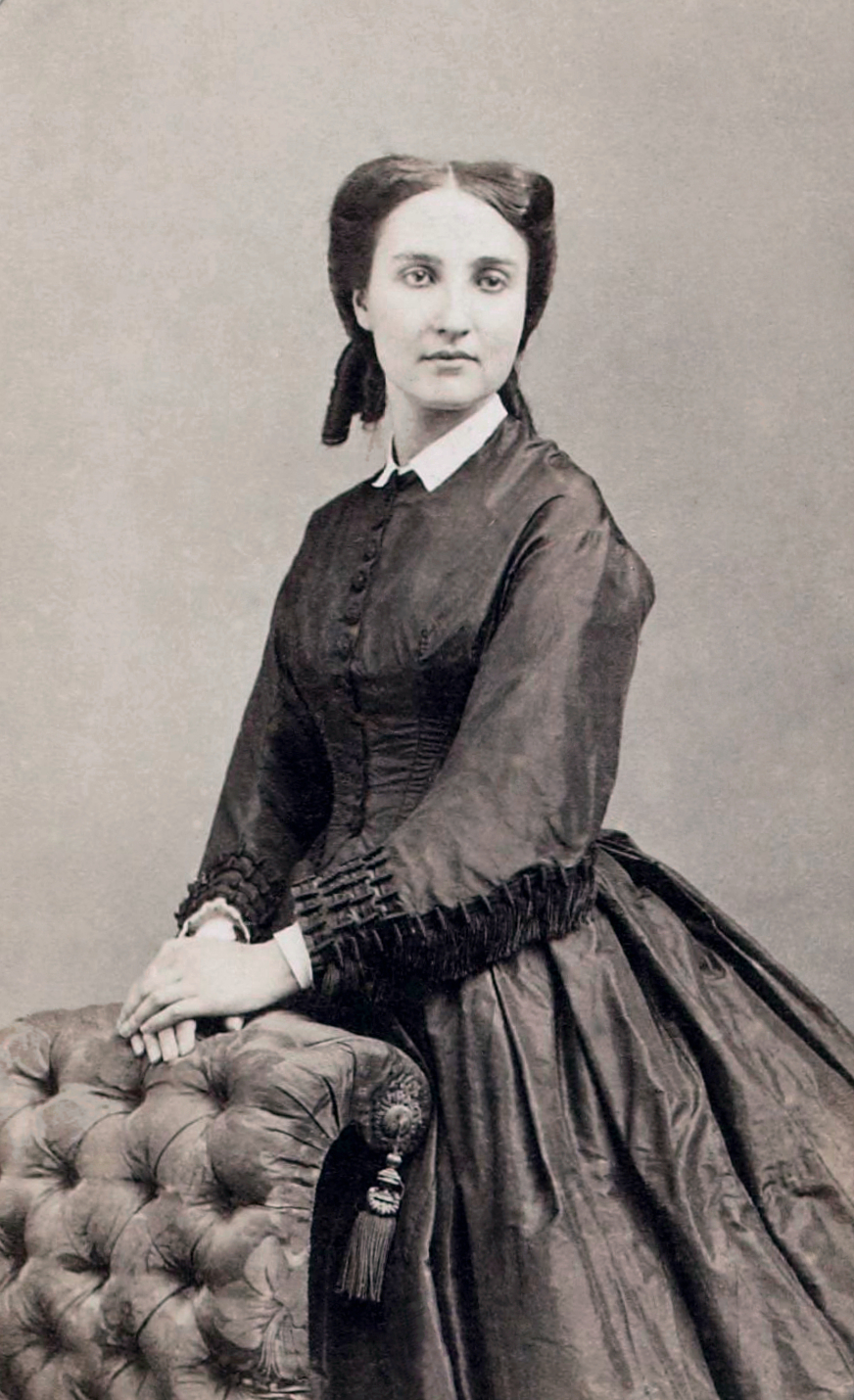
Empress Charlotte in mourning clothes. Photography by Eugène Disdéri, 1867.

On 24 September 1866, Charlotte arrived in Rome. Three days later, on 27 September, she had an audience with Pope Pius IX, but as was expected, the pontiff was reluctant to use his influence to intervene in French politics on the behalf of the Mexican Empire. Charlotte became despondent. Overwhelmed by despair and paranoia, she shut herself within her hotel. She dressed in mourning clothes and, in fear of poison, denied herself food and water. She asked to be taken to the Trevi Fountain to quench her thirst after not having consumed any liquid since the previous day. On 1 October, Charlotte went to the Vatican for a further meeting with the Pope, still dressed in mourning and with her face reportedly displaying sunken eyes and flushed cheeks. Crying hysterically, she refused to return to her hotel and begged to be sheltered for the night in the papal apartments, convinced that assassins sent by Napoleon III were waiting for her outside. The Pope let Charlotte eat part of his own dinner and, breaking the rules of the Holy See, had a bed moved into the pontifical library for her, making Charlotte the first woman known to have slept in the Vatican. (Note: In reality, Charlotte only slept for a few hours in the pontifical library before being escorted back to a hotel at nightfall.) In the following days, she confined herself to her hotel room, leaving only to drink water from public fountains, with a goblet that she had taken from the papal apartments.

King Leopold II grew worried about the news he received from Charlotte, so he sent his brother Prince Philippe, Count of Flanders to Rome, where he arrived on 8 October 1866. Two days later, Prince Philippe escorted his very depressed and unstable sister, and the two princes of Iturbide, to Miramare Castle. There, Charlotte persisted in her obsession with poisoning. The Count of Flanders reported their sister's erratic and strange behaviour to King Leopold II. After examining the Empress, Josef Gottfried von Riedel, a Viennese alienist physician, diagnosed "madness with fixed ideas of persecution", believing that the Mexican climate and the humiliating treatment that Charlotte received in France aggravated her condition. At Miramare, Charlotte was sequestered in the pavilion of the Gartenhaus, supervised by Austrian security agents.

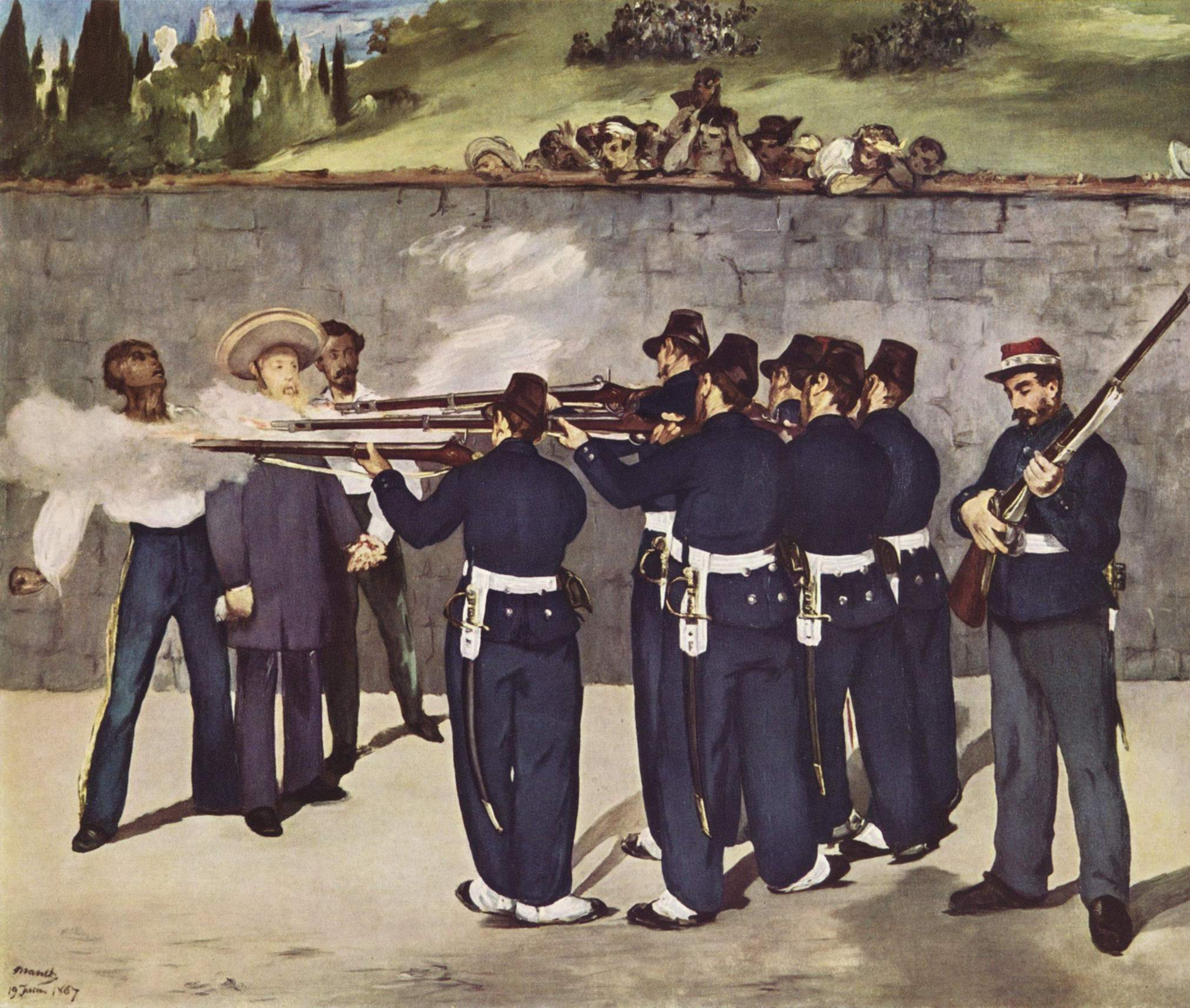
The Execution of Emperor Maximilian, by Édouard Manet, 1868.

When the news of the capture of Maximilian by Mexican Republican forces and his execution at Santiago de Querétaro on 19 June 1867 became known, the Belgian royal family interrupted their visit to Paris for the International Exposition, and returned to Brussels in early July 1867. Ultimately, Charlotte's family elected not to tell her of her husband's demise. With Maximilian's death, guardianship of Charlotte became an issue: she had so far accepted her confinement in Miramare, then in Austrian territory, believing that her husband demanded this confinement for her safety. Her brother, Leopold II, believed that there was no reason for Charlotte to stay in Austria and preferred that she return to her homeland of Belgium. However, after the arrest of Maximilian on 15 May, his brother Emperor Franz Joseph I had restored Maximilian's rights and titles as member of the House of Habsburg in an attempt to save his life, convinced that the rebels wouldn't dare to shoot an Austrian Archduke. Subsequently, Charlotte regained her status as an Archduchess of Austria and, therefore, her in-laws remained her legal guardians.

The Emperor of Austria sent Count Karl of Bombelles, and doctor August von Jilek, a friend of Maximilian, to Miramare Castle on behalf of the Habsburgs. Following the orders of Franz Joseph I, the Count of Bombelles argued to keep Charlotte in Miramare. In July 1867, King Leopold II sent his wife, Queen Marie Henriette of Austria and his confidant Baron Auguste Goffinet to Vienna to plead with the Emperor to allow for the release of Charlotte and her return to Belgium as soon as possible. When Queen Marie Henriette arrived at Miramare on 14 July 1867, she discovered Charlotte in a terrible physical and mental state, having been treated as a prisoner by the Austrian security forces for the last nine months. After two weeks of negotiations, Queen Marie Henriette and Goffinet succeeded in removing Charlotte from the guardianship of her in-laws and convincing her to return with them to Belgium. This success was largely thanks to Jan Frans Bulckens, a Belgian psychiatrist sent by Leopold II to care for his sister. Bulckens and his medical team kept Charlotte under close observation and determined that, due to the Dowager Empress' mental state, she could not be told of the execution of her husband. With the help of this medical team, Queen Marie Henriette devised a plan to give her sister-in-law a faked telegram from Maximilian, in which he asked her to come back to Brussels. The scheme worked and Charlotte, with the Belgian delegation, left Miramare for the last time.

After Charlotte's departure from Austria, Vienna and Brussels continued to argue over the issue of Charlotte's inheritance. Emperor Franz Joseph I placed his sister-in-law in the custody of his younger brother, Archduke Karl Ludwig of Austria in order to preserve her patrimony. Historian André Castelot in his work Maximilien et Charlotte : la tragédie de l'ambition confirmed the theory that, after the execution of Maximilian in Mexico, Charlotte's in-laws were concerned mostly with the fate of her fortune rather than the health and wellbeing of Charlotte herself. For the Austrian Imperial Court, it was in their financial interest to keep her in Miramare. There, her fortune was guarded under the care of Eduard von Radonetz, the prefect of Miramare, but when she returned to Belgium, the Viennese court was forced to pay her dowry to Leopold II.

=== Return to Belgium ===
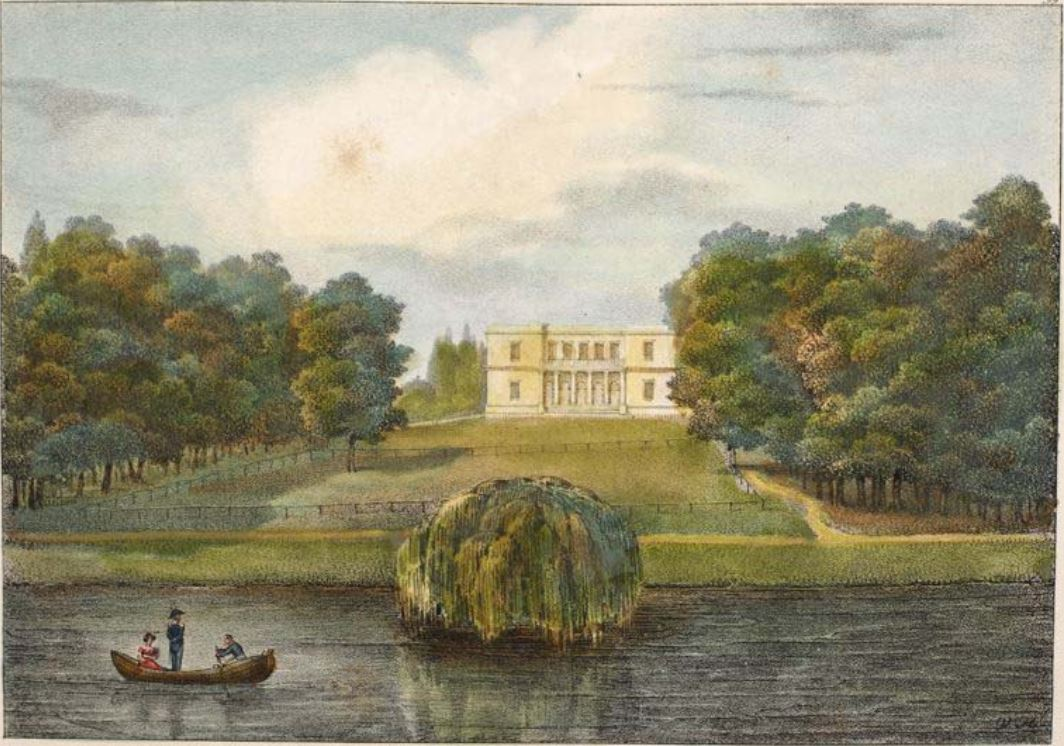
Pavilion de Tervueren, c. 1830.

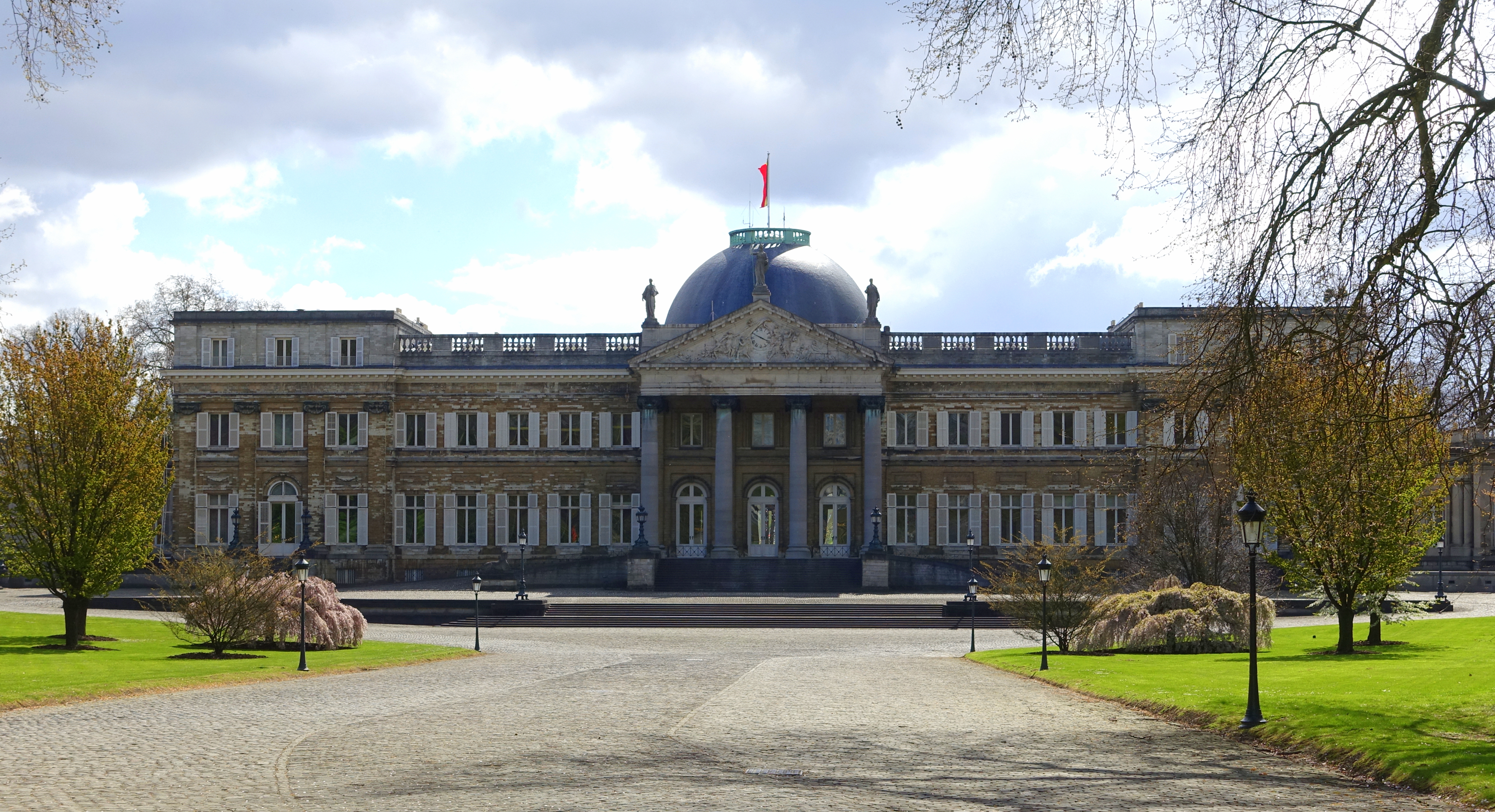
Palace of Laeken, 21st century.

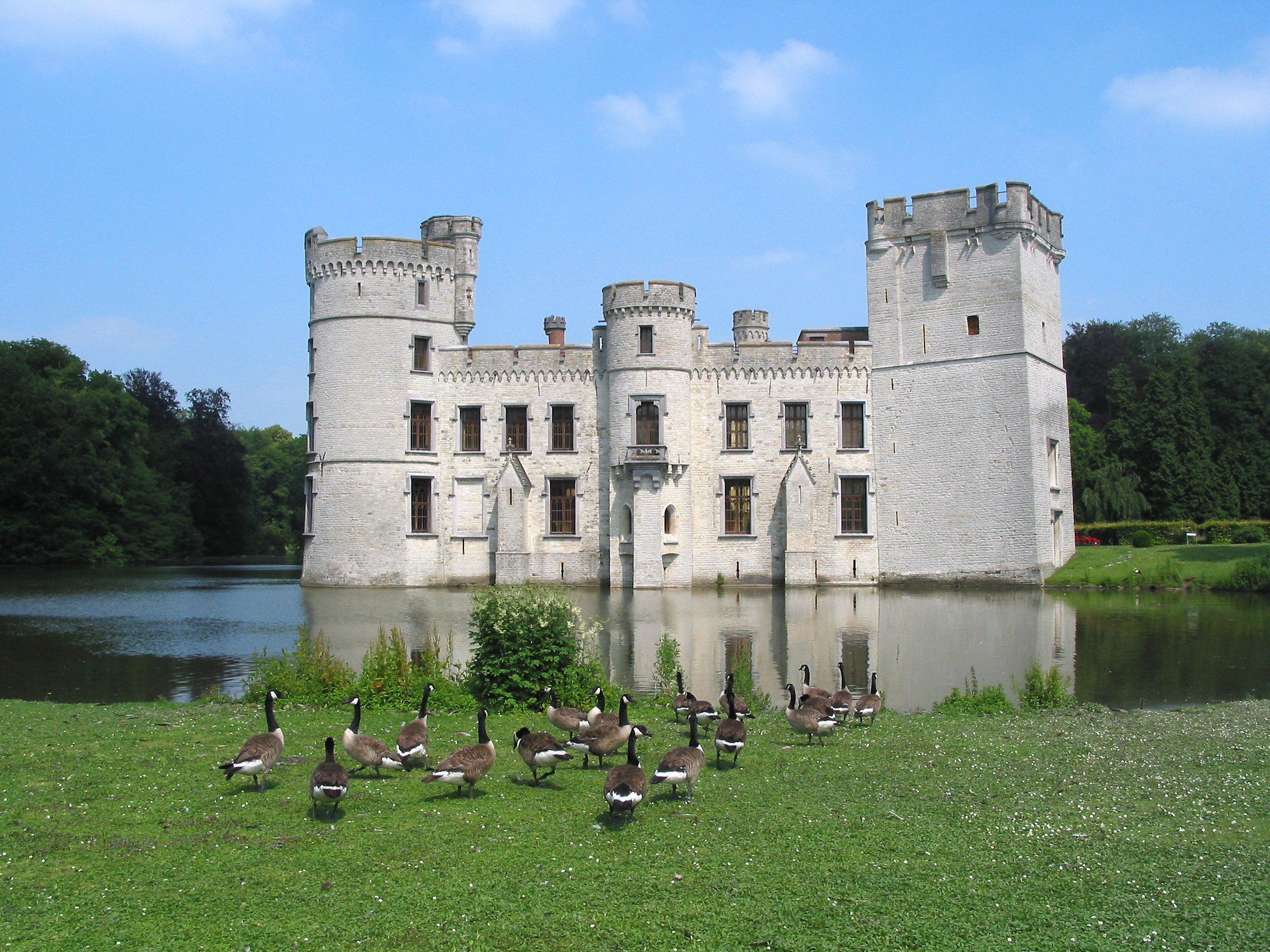
Bouchout Castle, 21st century.

Upon her arrival in Belgium, Charlotte resided until 8 October 1867 in the Pavilion of Tervuren near Brussels, which was built by Charles Vander Straeten for King William II of the Netherlands. The residence, however, was insufficiently furnished and poorly heated in the winter. She therefore joined King Leopold II and Queen Marie Henriette at the Palace of Laeken, where she moved into the former apartments of her brothers. When Charlotte finally learned, in January 1868, of the execution of her husband six months prior, she was shattered. In a set of nearly 400 letters found in 1995 (mainly intended for a French officer whom she had met in Mexico, Charles Loysel), she declares herself "dead" at the fall of the Mexican Empire. These letters by their number and their length (sometimes up to twenty pages) also offer the testimony of her daily life punctuated by paranoia attacks and the treatment given to her. (Note: Among the care provided, the press mentions "a treatment by electricity" adding: "This wonderful agent, who has not said his last word, gains every day new success in the cure of mental ailments and especially of lypemania".)

Charlotte's two adopted sons, the Princes of Iturbide, followed her to Belgium, but later both were sent to study in England. Agustín de Iturbide y Green later emigrated to the United States, while Salvador de Iturbide y de Marzán remained in Europe. (Note: Agustín died in Washington, D.C. on 3 March 1925, and Salvador died in Ajaccio, Corsica on 26 February 1895.) In May 1869, Charlotte left the Palace of Laeken to return to the Pavilion of Tervuren, where 37 people were assigned to her service. She continued a passionate worship of her late husband's memory, collecting everything that had belonged to him. After the Pavilion of Tervuren was destroyed by a fire on 2 March 1879 (which Charlotte was paradoxically delighted by), she resided permanently at Bouchout Castle in Meise (not far from the Palace of Laeken), which her brother, King Leopold II, acquired for her. In the final years of his life, the King diligently supervised the care of his sister. The Dowager Empress of Mexico wrote notes of profound gratitude for the care she received from her brother and nephews.

=== Later years ===
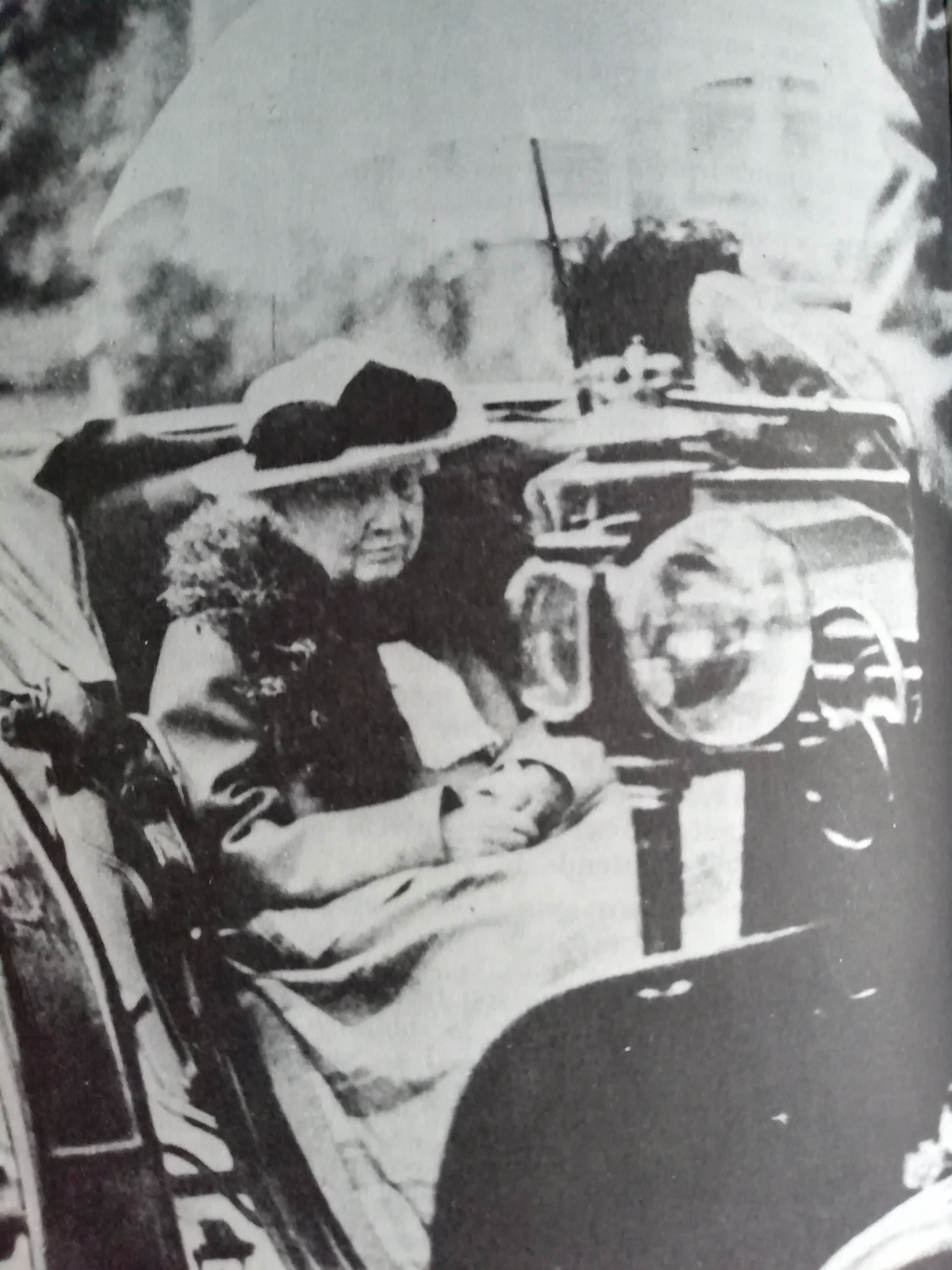
In a horse-drawn carriage, protected by an umbrella, Charlotte is driven in the park of the Bouchout estate, c. 1914.

Charlotte disappeared completely from the public sphere, protected by the high gates of her domain and the guards which protected them. She received visits only from her family: mainly from her sisters-in-law, Queen Marie Henriette and the Countess of Flanders. On Sundays, an abbot came to say mass at Bouchout Castle. To distract herself, she went on walks, embroidered, played cards, and listened to her newly invented gramophone. She was not informed of the deaths of her close relatives (King Leopold II in 1909 and her sister-in-law, the Countess of Flanders, wife of her brother Philippe, in 1912), nor those of her servants, because she never asked questions about their absence.

Her lady-in-waiting, Hélène, Countess of Reinach-Foussemagne, said about Charlotte: "Most of the time, the unfortunate woman was absorbed in long silences, or on the contrary in heated discussions in French, English, German, Italian, Spanish, with imaginary interlocutors, discussions too incoherent, too disjointed for one to be able to guess what thoughts occupied this brain. [...] In her soliloquies pass from time to time, very rarely, sentences, interjections which prove that sometimes her obscured thought returns on these lamentable memories: Sir, one told you that one had had a husband; a husband, sir, and then madness! Madness is made of events! If he had been helped by Napoleon!...". For their part, Princess Marie-José and Prince Charles recalled their visits to their great-aunt, remembering an elderly lady making confused remarks. Periods of lucidity became rarer over time. In crises of destructive mood swings, she gave in to outbursts of uncontrollable anger and destroyed crockery and crystal vases, set her hounds on a maid, and tore up pictures and books. This alternated with periods of calm when she peacefully undertook simple occupations.

During World War I, Belgium was invaded. Only a tiny part of the country remained free of German occupation, the town of De Panne, where King Albert I, Charlotte's nephew, lived until the signing of the Armistice of 11 November 1918. Charlotte did not see her family during the war. Despite the conflict, her status as Archduchess of Austria protected her from the German occupier, and her way of life remained unchanged. She flew the Austro-Hungarian flag on the roof of Bouchout Castle; and in March 1916, a German officer inquired as to why the Austrian colors flew on a property in occupied Belgium. In response, General Moritz von Bissing, at the head of the Imperial German General Government of Belgium, had a sign affixed to the gates of the castle, which read as follows: "This domain, property of the Crown of Belgium, is occupied by Her Majesty the Empress of Mexico, Archduchess Maximilian of Austria, sister-in-law of Emperor Franz Joseph, our illustrious ally. (Note: Austria-Hungary was one of the chief allies of the German Empire during World War I.) I order the German soldiers passing by here not to ring the bell and to leave the place untouched."

=== Death ===
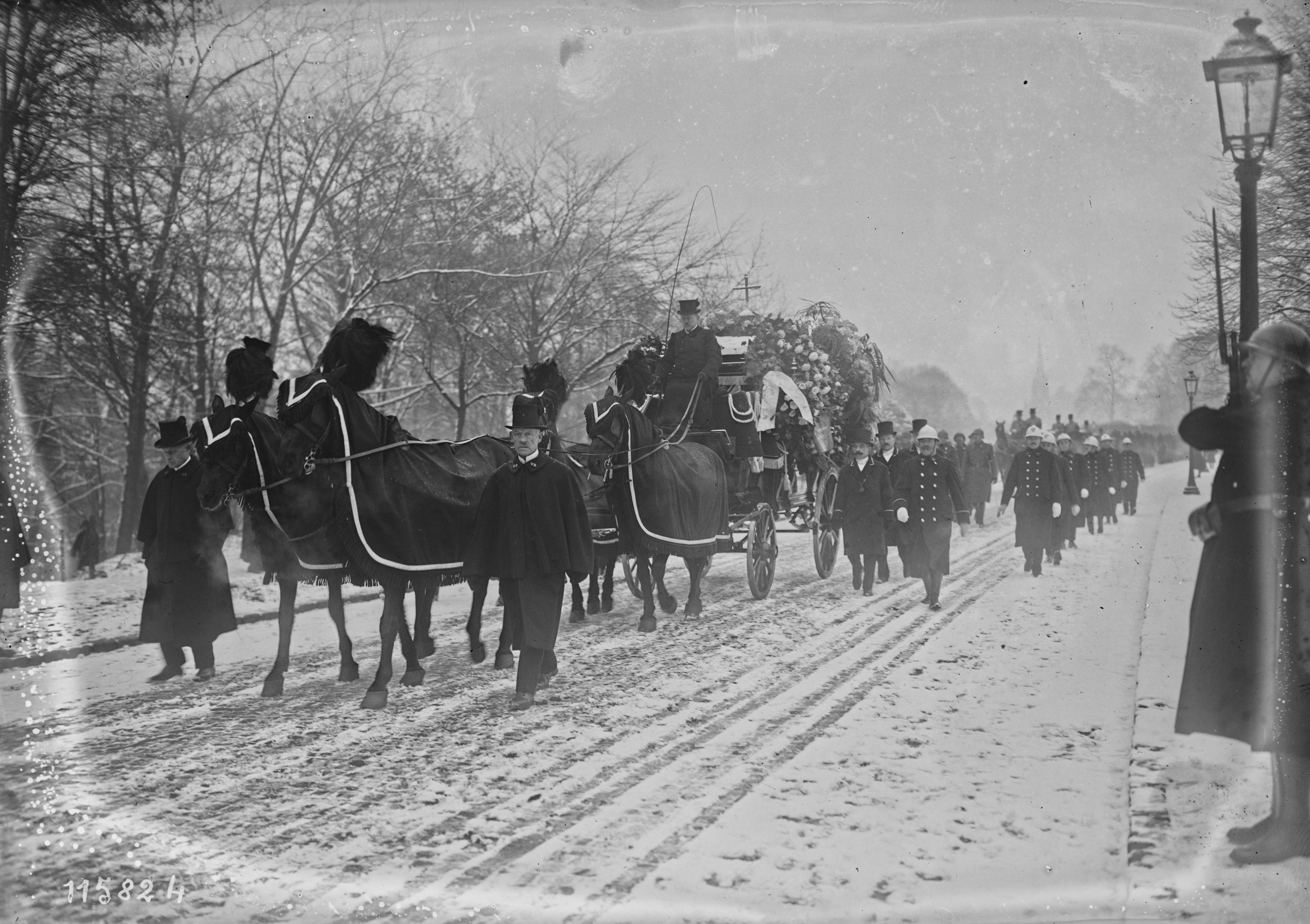
Charlotte's funeral in Laeken, on 22 January 1927.

Charlotte died at Bouchout Castle on 19 January 1927, at the age of 86, after developing pneumonia brought on by influenza. Various versions exist regarding the last words spoken by Charlotte on her deathbed:

- According to Prince Michael of Greece, she sighed holding a rosary and murmuring:
  «Mexico (Mexique).»
- According to José Iturriaga De la Fuente:
  «Remind the universe of the beautiful blond-haired foreigner. God willing we are remembered with sadness, but without hatred.»
- According to S. van Eckhaus:
  «All that ended without being successful (Tout cela est fini et n'aboutira pas).»
- According to Caroline de Bransner, one of her ladies-in-waiting, in relation to having been reclined on her bed instead of her lounger as she wished:
  «I expressed myself badly in words and I will regret it" (Je m'ai mal exprimée en paroles et j'en piitirai).»

Three days later, on 22 January, and under heavy snow, her coffin was carried by six former Belgian Legionaries who survived the Expedition to Mexico. She was buried in the Royal Crypt of the Church of Our Lady of Laeken, in the presence of King Albert I and his sons, the Duke of Brabant and the Count of Flanders. On 25 January, a funeral service was celebrated in the church of Meise in the presence of the entire Belgian Royal family: King Albert I, Queen Elisabeth, their three children the Duke of Brabant, the Count of Flanders and Princess Marie-José, the Duchess of Brabant, the Prince and Princess Napoleon, as well as Princess Clémentine. Much of Charlotte's personal fortune was managed by King Leopold II, and was eventually used to finance the colonial enterprise of Congo.

Since 1902, Charlotte had hosted the painter Edwin Ganz in her domain of Bouchout, who was a specialist in the representation of horses and close to the royal family, in particular Princess Clémentine. After Charlotte's death, the artist continued to occupy the outbuildings of the castle until his death in 1948.

In 1938, the Belgian State bought Bouchout Castle with the intention to establish the National Botanical Garden of Belgium, which had grown too cramped on its Brussels site, and the land was inaugurated 20 years later. This garden took the name of Meise Botanic Garden in 2014; the interior of the castle was redeveloped from 1980 into meeting and conference rooms, to accommodate congresses, exhibitions and other festive events.

=== Mental illness ===
The nature of Charlotte's mental pathology - psychosis, paranoia, or monomania - proved extremely difficult to determine with certainty a posteriori, giving rise to several hypotheses.

Several authors have suggested the illness originated from ingestion of toxic chemicals. This hypothesis was notably put forward by Joan Haslip, who noted that one of the Mexican court doctors added bromide to Charlotte's coffee without her knowing. In Mexico, from July 1867, rumours spread that the madness of the Empress was attributed to a poison which had been given to her regularly in small doses. Roger Heim's research corroborates this possibility, namely that Charlotte could have been "little by little intoxicated while she was still in Mexico, by the introduction in her food for a prolonged time of a psychotropic drug". When she made an official visit to Yucatán, Charlotte wrote to her husband on 8 December 1865: "The doctor is very nice. Without her well-suited little medications, I would probably have fallen ill and could not have taken all of this. On several occasions it seemed to me that there was poison in the air."

Other authors, such as Laurence Van Ypersele, Émile Meurice, Dominique Paoli, and Coralie Vankerkhoven, relying both on Charlotte's correspondence (in the year 1869 alone, from February to June, she wrote some 400 letters and notes) and on the reports written by the doctors who examined her, (Note: Upon her arrival to Miramare Castle in October 1866, Charlotte was examined by psychiatrist Josef Gottfried von Riedel, Director of the insane house of Vienna and by doctor August von Jilek, personal doctor of the Emperor of Austria, who co-signed a report addressed to her brother Prince Philippe, Count of Flanders. This report stated that their patient "is definitely suffering from insanity with fixed ideas of persecution which are produced by a more serious and stronger mental illness than one might first believe".) favoured the study of the psychological aspect of the pathology of Charlotte. They evoke biographical and personal influences to explain the Empress' dementia, namely: the loss of her mother at only 10 years old (which originated the radical transformation of her playful and expansive character towards introversion), her keen sense of duty, her high religiosity, her latent mysticism, her euphoria during her engagement, her idealization of Maximilian, the absence of conjugal life, and the disenchantments and disillusions in Italy and then in Mexico. Coralie Vankerkhoven also mentions the first warning signs of the disease: notably, the discomfort she felt in Uxmal (where the first signs of her psychosis arose from the strangeness of the conditions during her stay in Yucatán), and her reaction to the successive announcements of the deaths of her father and grandmother, until her arrival in Europe where her delusional disorder settled permanently. Gustavo Vazquez-Lozano interprets the letters of 1869 within the matrix of apocalyptic language, i.e. relating to the final fate of humanity and the consummation of things, where one or more otherworldly figures reveal a transcendental reality to the visionary. In this view, Charlotte utilized the language of the Book of Revelation to reorder her inner world.

== Titles and honours ==
=== Titles ===
At her birth, as the daughter of King Leopold I, Charlotte was titled Princess of Saxe-Coburg and Gotha and Duchess in Saxony, with the predicate of Royal Highness, according to the titles of her house, and bore the unofficial title of Princess of Belgium, which would be officially regularized by Royal Decree dated 14 March 1891. From 1864 to her death, she was styled Her Imperial Majesty the Empress of Mexico.

=== Honours ===
- Mexican Empire:
  - Grand Mistress and Dame Grand Cross of the Imperial Order of San Carlos for Noble Ladies
  - Dame Grand Cross of the Imperial Order of the Mexican Eagle
  - Dame Grand Cross of the Imperial Order of Guadalupe
- Austrian Empire: Dame of the Imperial Order of the Starry Cross
- Sovereign Military Order of Malta: Dame Grand Cross of Honour and Devotion
- Kingdom of Portugal: Dame Grand Cross of the Order of Saint Isabel, 19 April 1865
- Kingdom of Spain: 525th Dame of the Order of Queen Maria Luisa, 22 December 1857

== Arms ==
Coat of arms of Carlota, Titular Empress Dowager of Mexico as dame of the Order of Queen Maria Luisa

Dual Cypher of Emperor Maximilian and Empress Carlota of Mexico

== In popular culture ==
=== Movies ===
- Bette Davis portrayed Empress Charlotte in the film Juarez (1939), directed by William Dieterle.
- Helena Rojo portrayed the Empress in the film Those Years (Spanish: Aquellos años, 1973).

=== Plays ===
- Maximilien, historical opera in three acts and nine scenes; book by RS Hoffman inspired by the drama Juárez und Maximilian by Franz Werfel; music by Darius Milhaud (1932).
- Carlota, one-act opera by Francisco Zendejas; music by Luis Sandi (1948).
- Charlotte's "little homesick chapel" in Mexico City is referenced as a tourist destination in Tennessee Williams's play The Night of the Iguana (1961).
- La emperatriz de la mentira, opera by Ángel Norzagaray; music by Dmitri Dudin (2012).

=== Television ===
- María Rivas portrayed the Empress in the historical telenovela Maximiliano y Carlota (1965), directed by Ernesto Alonso.
- The program Secrets d'Histoire on France 3 from 9 December 2019, entitled Charlotte et Maximilien, les sombres héros de Mexico, is dedicated to her. The actress playing the Empress Charlotte in the evocation sequences is Charlotte Aftassi.
- Josephine Thiesen portrayed Charlotte in the Netflix TV series The Empress (German: Die Kaiserin) from the second series.
- Belinda Peregrín is set to play Empress Charlotte in SPT's epic historical TV series, Carlota.

=== Comics ===
On 24 August 2018, Dargaud published the first volume of a series of biographical comics, Charlotte impératrice - La Princesse et l'Archiduc, by Matthieu Bonhomme (drawing) and Fabien Nury (screenplay). The second volume, entitled Charlotte impératrice - L'Empire, was published on 12 June 2020. The third volume, entitled Charlotte impératrice - Adios, Carlotta, was published on 12 May 2023. The fourth and last volume, entitled Charlotte impératrice - 60 ans de solitude, was published on 18 April 2025.

=== Music ===
In 1866, the liberal writer Vicente Riva Palacio composed a satirical song called Adiós, mamá Carlota (Goodbye, mother Carlota), criticizing Carlota, the imperialists and conservative politicians. It is based on the poem Adiós, oh Patria mía (Goodbye, my homeland) written in 1842 by Ignacio Rodríguez Galván.

== See also ==
- List of heads of state of Mexico
- Baron Auguste Goffinet

== Bibliography ==
- Bénit, André (2017). Charlotte, Princesse de Belgique et Impératrice du Mexique (1840-1927). Un conte de fées qui tourne au délire (in French). Plougastel. ISBN 978-2-91299-462-2.
- Bénit, André (2017). "Charlotte de Belgique, impératrice du Mexique. Une plongée dans les ténèbres de la folie. Essai de reconstitution fictionnelle". Mises en littérature de la folie. Monografías de Çédille (in French). 7 (7). Universidad de La Lagune: 13–54. doi:10.21071/ced.v7i.10887. ISSN 1699-4949.
- Bénit, André (2020). Légendes, intrigues et médisances autour des "archidupes". Charlotte de Saxe-Cobourg-Gotha, princesse de Belgique / Maximilien de Habsbourg, archiduc d'Autriche (in French). Brussels: Éditions scientifiques internationales Peter Lang. ISBN 978-2-8076-1470-3.
- Bibesco, Princess Marthe (1962). Charlotte et Maximilien (in French). Paris: Ditis.
- Bilteryst, Damien (2014). Philippe comte de Flandre – Frère de Léopold II (PDF) (in French). Bruxelles: Éditions Racine. ISBN 978-2-87386-894-9.
- Capron, Victor (1986). Le Mariage de Maximilien et Charlotte. Journal du duc de Brabant. 1856-1857 (in French). Brussels.
- Castelot, André (2002). Maximilien et Charlotte du Mexique : la tragédie de l'ambition (in French). Paris: Perrin. ISBN 978-2-26201-765-1.
- Corti, Conte Egon Caesar (1924). Maximilian und Charlotte von Mexiko. Nach dem bisher unveröffentlichten Geheimarchive des Kaisers Maximilian und sonstigen unbekannten Quellen. 2 vols (in Spanish). Zurich, Leipzig, Vienna.
- Corti, Conte Egon Caesar (1953). Maximilian von Mexiko. Die Tragödie eines Kaisers (in German). Frankfurt am Main.
- Defrance, Olivier (2004). Léopold Ier et le clan Cobourg (in French). Bruxelles: Racine. ISBN 978-2-87386-335-7.
- Defrance, Olivier (2012). Ramener Charlotte. La mission du baron Adrien Goffinet à Vienne et Miramar – juillet 1867 (in French). Bruxelles: King Baudouin Foundation. ISBN 978-2-87212-669-9.
- de Reinach-Foussemagne, Hélène (1925). Charlotte de Belgique, impératrice du Mexique (in French). Paris: Plon.
- Desternes, Suzanne; Chandet, Henriette (1964). Maximilien et Charlotte (in French). Paris: Librairie Académique Perrin.
- del Paso, Fernando (1987). Noticias del Imperio (in Spanish). México. ISBN 9681318110.
- Gómez Tepexicuapan, Amparo (2001). Igler, Susanne; Spiller, Roland (eds.). Carlota en México. Más nuevas del imperio (in Spanish). Frankfurt am Main: Estudios interdisciplinarios acerca de Carlota de México. pp. 27–40.
- Harding, Bertita (1934). Phantom Crown: The story of Maximilian and Carlota of Mexico. New York.
- Huberty, Michel; Giraud, Alain (1976). L'Allemagne dynastique – HESSE-REUSS-SAXE (in French). Vol. I. Le Perreux-sur-Marne.
- Hyde, Montgomery H. (1946). Mexican Empire. The history of Maximilian and Carlota of Mexico. London.
- Igler, Susanne (2002). Carlota de México (in Spanish). Mexico.
- Igler, Susanne (2006). Carlota de México. Grandes Protagonistas de la Historia Mexicana (in Spanish) (2nd ed.).
- Igler, Susanne (2007). De la intrusa infame a la loca del castillo: Carlota de México en la literatura de su 'patria adoptiva' (in Spanish). Frankfurt: Peter Lang.
- Kerckvoorde, Mia (1981). Charlotte: la passion, la fatalité (in French). Paris: Duculot.
- Léon Niox, Gustave (1874). Expédition du Mexique, 1861-1867; récit politique & militaire (in French). Paris.
- Lacerda Martins de Almeida, Sylvia (1973). Uma filha de D. Pedro I – Dona Maria Amélia (in Portuguese). Sao Paulo: Companhia Editora Nacional. ASIN B0037F14XW.
- Lambotte, Janine (1993). Charlotte et Maximilien: l'Empire des archidupes (in French). éditions Labor/RTBF Éditions. ISBN 2-8040-0907-6. OCLC 30898347.
- Maria y Campos, Armando (1944). Carlota de Bélgica: La infortunada Emperatriz de México (in Spanish). México.
- McAllen, M. M. (2014). Maximilian and Carlota. Europe's Last Empire in Mexico. Trinity University Press. ISBN 978-1-59534-183-9.
- of Greece, Prince Michael (1998). The Empress of Farewells: The Story of Charlotte, Empress of Mexico. New York. ISBN 978-2-7382-1502-4.
- Paoli, Dominique (2008). L'Impératrice Charlotte - Le soleil noir de la mélancolie (in French). Paris: Perrin. ISBN 978-2-262-02131-3.
- Praviel, Armand (1937). La vida trágica de la emperatriz Carlota (in Spanish). Buenos Aires.
- Ridley, Jasper (2001). Maximilian & Juarez. London: Phoenix Press.
- Vazquez-Lozano, Gustavo (2023). Sixty Years of Solitude: The Life of Empress Charlotte of Mexico. Libros de México. ISBN 9798988041511.
- Vankerkhoven, Coralie (2012). Charlotte de Belgique, une folie impériale (in French). Brussels: Le Bord de l'Eau. ISBN 978-2-35687-156-5.

Charlotte of Belgium House of Saxe-Coburg and Gotha Cadet branch of the House of Wettin Born: 7 June 1840 Died: 19 January 1927
Mexican royalty
Vacant Title last held by Ana María Huarte	Empress consort of Mexico; 10 April 1864 – 15 May 1867	Monarchy abolished
