= Jílek =

Jílek (feminine: Jílková) is a Czech surname, derived from the given name Jiljí (Czech variant of Giles). The surname was first documented in 1554. Notable people with the surname include:

- August von Jilek (1819–1898), Czech naval doctor
- Bohumil Jílek (1892–1963), Czech politician
- Dan Jilek (1953–2002), American footballer
- František Jílek (1913–1993), Czech conductor
- Gabriela Jílková (born 1995), Czech racing driver
- Jan Jílek (born 1973), Czech football referee
- Jaroslav Jílek (javelin thrower) (born 1989), Czech javelin thrower
- Jaroslav Jílek (table tennis), Czech table tennis player
- Metoděj Jílek (born 2006), Czech speed skater
- Václav Jílek (born 1976), Czech football manager

== See also ==
- Markéta Zinnerová, married Markéta Jílková (born 1942), Czech writer
