= Battle of la Loma =

1865 conflict

Coordinates: 19.1866°N 101.4188°W

- Part of the Second French intervention in Mexico
Date	16 July 1865
Location	Tacámbaro, Michoacán, Mexico
Result	Belgian victory

Belligerents
(Mexico) Mexican Republicans	(Mexico) Mexican Empire: (Belgium) Belgian Legion

Commanders and leaders
(Mexico) José María Arteaga	(Belgium) Alfred Van der Smissen

Strength
3,000 Republicans	350 Belgians; 730 Mexicans

Casualties and losses
300-400 killed or wounded 181 prisoners	20 killed or wounded

The Batalle of la Loma was a minor engagement of the Second French intervention in Mexico which took place on 16 July 1865 in the vicinity of Hacienda de la Loma in the current municipality of Tacámbaro, Michoacán.

== The Battle ==
The battle occurred between members of the Mexican Republican army, led by General José María Arteaga, and the Belgian Legion, supporting French and Mexican Imperial troops, led by Lieutenant Colonel Alfred van der Smissen..

Lieutenant-Colonel Alfred van der Smissen learned that General José María Arteaga, had reoccupied Tacámbaro with some 3,000 men. Van der Smissen left Santa Clara that same day with his Belgian-Mexican column of some 1,000 men. His army charged with bayonets at the enemy inexperienced infantry, which offered only weak resistance, broke ranks and fled, with the Imperial cavalry in pursuit.

Despite the Belgian victory, the Mexican mission was highly expensive for Belgium because just half of 1,500 soldiers sent to Mexico returned to Europe at the end of the war.
