= Gustavo Vázquez-Lozano =

Mexican writer and editor

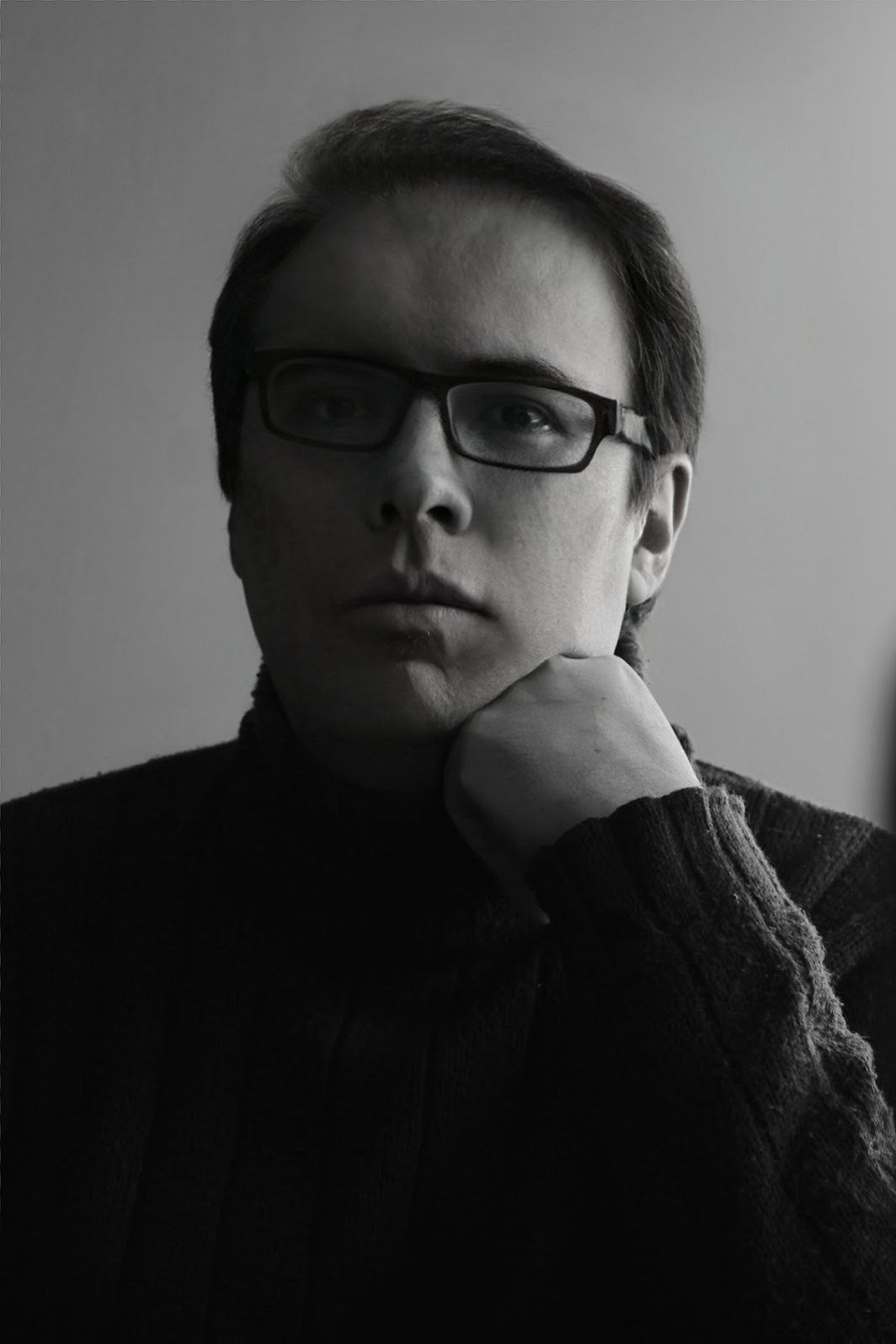
Gustavo Vázquez-Lozano at the Guadalajara International Book Fair in 2013.

Gustavo Vázquez-Lozano (born on May 2, 1969) is a writer and Mexican editor. He is the author of four novels, a short story collection, a graphic novel, and more than 30 non-fiction works, especially 60 Years of Solitude: The Life of Empress Charlotte of Mexico, and The Aztec Eagles: The History of the Mexican Pilots Who Fought in World War II. In 2016, his novel El elefante que sonreía ("The elephant that smiled ") won the Sor Juana Inés de la Cruz International Literature Award. He is member of the Sistema Nacional de Creadores de Arte (National System of Art Creators).

== Biography ==
Gustavo Vázquez-Lozano was born in Aguascalientes, Mexico. At the age of 16, he began writing for Conecte, one of Mexico's pioneering rock magazines, where reviewed albums by the Rolling Stones and became a regular contributor. During this time, he also wrote short stories for children in local newspapers.

He studied economics in the Autonomous University of Aguascalientes. A few years later he continued his education in CUNY and Georgetown University.

After a brief hiatus, Gustavo Vázquez-Lozano resumed his career with the publication of his first novel, El león de oro ("The golden lion"), in 1996. He has frequently cited his nightmares as a key source of inspiration. Other novels followed between 1998 and 2023.

== Literary style ==
Vázquez-Lozano's novels delve into themes of mystery, with characters navigating despair, the drudgery of daily life, magical elements, love, and betrayal. His stories blend nightmares and personal obsessions with the mundane aspects of everyday existence. El elefante que sonreía, set against the backdrop of a crumbling circus in the 1960s, "is not about abnormality or rarity, but about the abnormality exhibited by those who take their passions to dangerous extremes." His award-winning short story El antiguo enemigo ("The ancient enemy"), which earned the Beatriz Espejo National Short Story Award, portrays the final hours of President Francisco Madero's life.

As a non-fiction writer, he has authored over 30 books aimed at a general audience, focusing on world history, particularly the histories of Mexico and the United States, and the relationship between both countries. The Aztec Eagles: The History of the Mexican Pilots Who Fought in World War II argues that Mexico's modest involvement in World War II through its 201st Fighter Squadron laid the foundation for modern diplomatic relations between Mexico and the United States, which had previously been defined by hostility.

Vázquez-Lozano often chooses to write about marginalized historical figures. In 60 Years of Solitude: The life of Empress Charlotte of Mexico he challenges the common belief that Empress Charlotte of Belgium was pregnant when she left Mexico, instead portraying her as the architect of the country's first social policy. In El indio Victoriano he humanizes and brings new perspective to the historical figure of Victoriano Huerta, often viewed as the ultimate villain of Mexican history, offering insights into his internal conflicts, character and true motivations. In The Aztec Eagles: The History of the Mexican Pilots Who Fought in World War II, he argues that the 201st Fighter Squadron was conveniently forgotten by the State, despite its triumphs extending beyond military achievements to influence diplomacy.

Vazquez-Lozano's short fiction has appeared in The Los Angeles Review and The Maine Review. As a columnist, he has contributed to several magazines, including Parteaguas, Algarabía and Daily Chela. He also has a strong interest in rock music and has occasionally written about the gender, notably a biography of the Rolling Stones.

== Awards and recognitions ==
He has received several prestigious awards, including the Beatriz Espejo National Short Story Award for El antiguo enemigo (“The ancient enemy”), the Sor Juana Inés de la Cruz International Prize of Literature for his novel El elefante que sonreía ("The elephant that smiled") and the Ignacio Solares National Award of Historical Novel for El indio Victoriano in 2024. In 2025 he was awarded with the Eraclio Zepeda National Short Story Prize for Pequeñas variaciones del alma ("Minor Shifts of the Soul"). In 2025, he was a finalist for the Oxford Flash Fiction Prize. La Estrella del Sur was shortlisted for the Gran Angular Prize in 2002 and was selected by the Alas y Raíces program to be distributed to classroom libraries in Mexico. Some of his works have been translated into different languages such as English and Portuguese. Gustavo Vázquez-Lozano also served as an evaluator of novels for students of the Doctorate in Literary Creation at Casa Lamm. Since 2021 he has been a member of the National System of Creators of Art (Sistema Nacional de Creadores de Arte, or SNCA).

== Selected works ==
=== Fiction ===
- La Estrella del Sur (2003)
- El Monstruo Interior (2005)
- 1914: Convención de Aguascalientes (2014)
- El Elefante que Sonreía (2017)
- El Antiguo Enemigo, included in the anthology El Espejo de Beatriz (2021)
- El Indio Victoriano (2023)
- Yo, Benemérito. Las últimas confesiones de Juárez (2026)

=== Nonfiction ===
- Santa Anna: The Life and Legacy of the Legendary Mexican President and General (2017)
- 60 Years of Solitude. The Life of Empress Charlotte of Mexico (2023)
- Mexico and the World Wars: The History of Germany's Efforts to Involve Mexico (2019)
- The Aztec Eagles: The History of the Mexican Pilots Who Fought in World War II (2019)
- Chapultepec: The History and Legend of the Only Real Castle in the Americas (2019)
