= Albert Gräfle =

German painter (1809-1889)

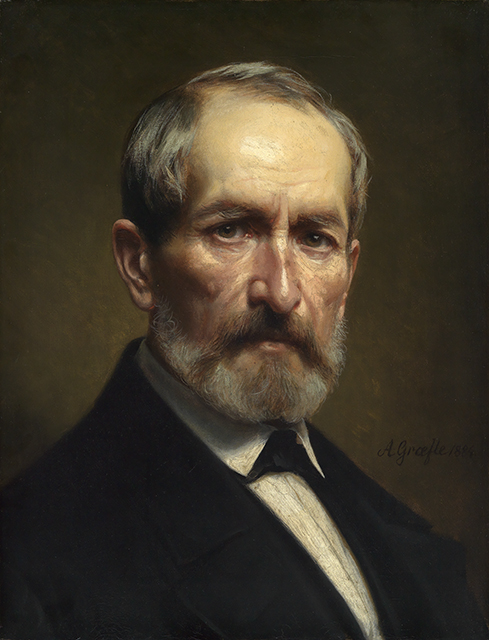
Albert Gräfle, self portrait (1884)

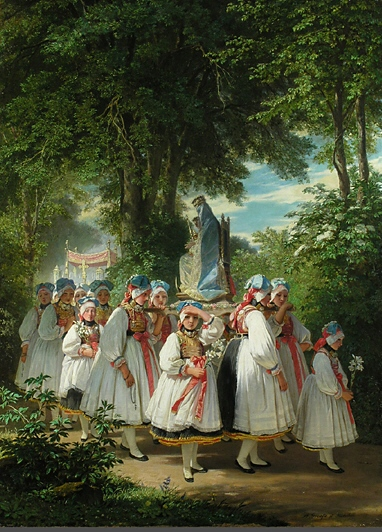
Mary's Procession

Albert Gräfle (1809–1889) was a German historical, genre, and portrait painter.

== Biography ==
He was born at Freiburg, where he studied philosophy at the university. In 1827, he became the pupil of Peter von Cornelius and Julius Schnorr von Carolsfeld at the Munich Academy, and from 1840 studied under Franz Xaver Winterhalter in Paris, where he was awarded a gold medal in 1846. After traveling in France and England, he settled in Munich in 1852. Besides the "Triumph of Arminius" (Karlsruhe Gallery), and some altarpieces, his more important productions include: "The Seasons and the Divisions of the Day", and "Corpus Christi Procession of Peasant Women" (1860), both in the grand-ducal palace at Karlsruhe; and "Conradin Taking Farewell of his Mother, Elizabeth of Bavaria". He also painted many portraits of royalties (Queen Victoria, Maximilian I of Mexico, etc.), and for Linderhof Palace, Bavaria, a series of twenty celebrities – men and famous beauties – in the time of Louis XIV.

== See also ==
- List of German painters
