= Alfred van der Smissen =

Belgian officer (1823–1895)

Lt Gen Alfred van der Smissen 2nd Baron van der Smissen
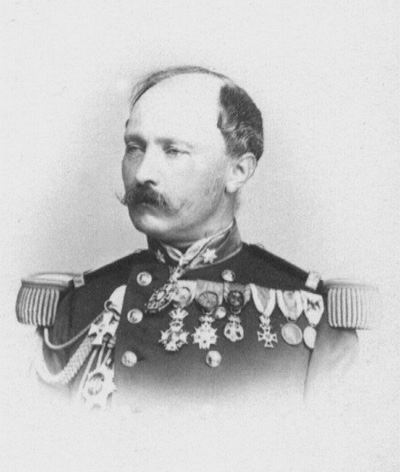
- Born: Alfred-Louis-Adolphe-Graves van der Smissen; 1 February 1823; Brussels, United Kingdom of the Netherlands
- Died: 16 June 1895 (aged 72); Brussels, Belgium
- Spouse: Henriette Dubois (partner)
- Children: Alfred van der Smissen, Maxime Weygand (likely)
- Relatives: Thomas Graves, 1st Baron Graves, his great-uncle
- Military career
- Allegiance: Belgium, France
- Rank: Lieutenant general
- Conflicts: French conquest of Algeria; Second Franco-Mexican War

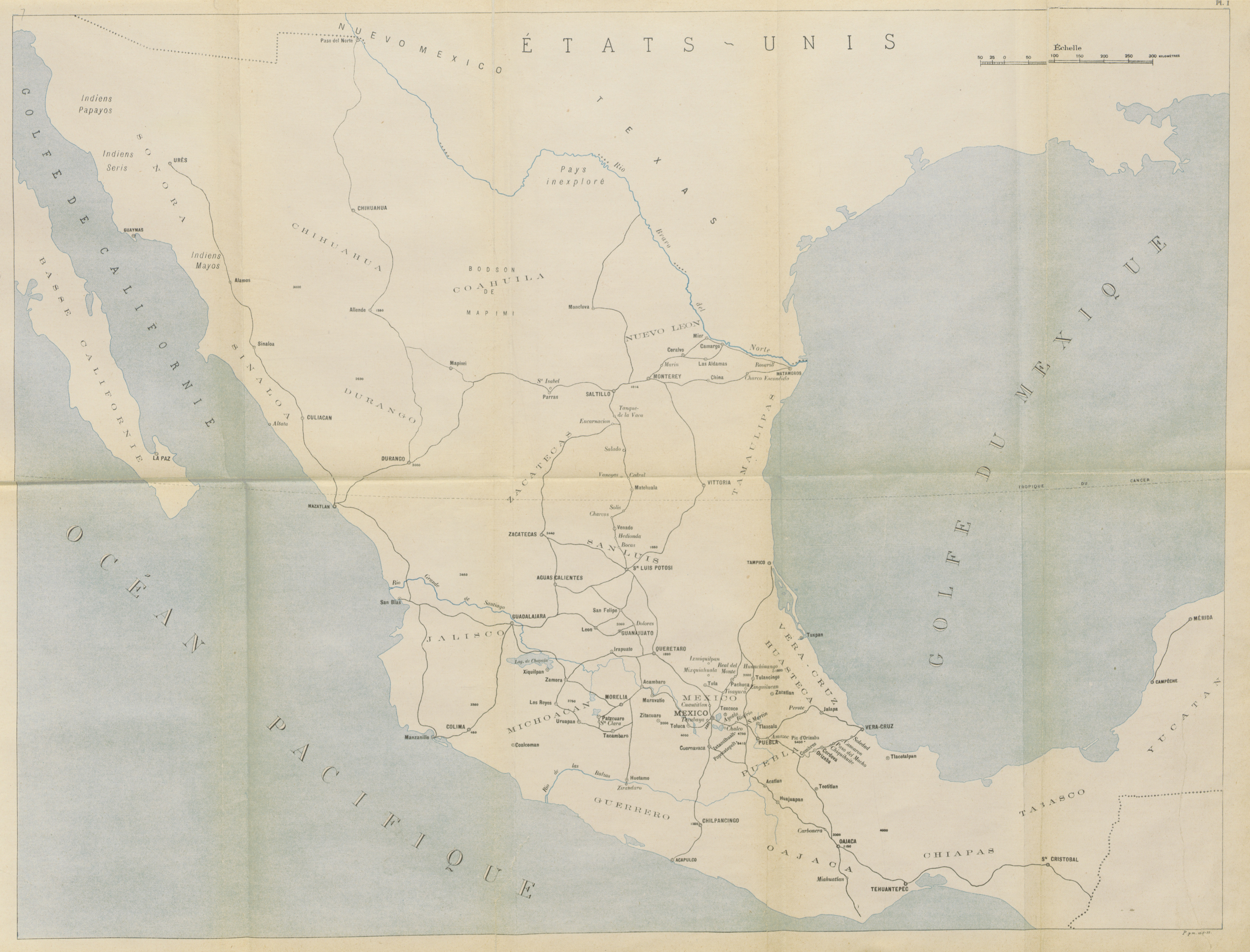
Map of Mexico by van der Smissen in his book Souvenirs du Mexique, 1864-1867.

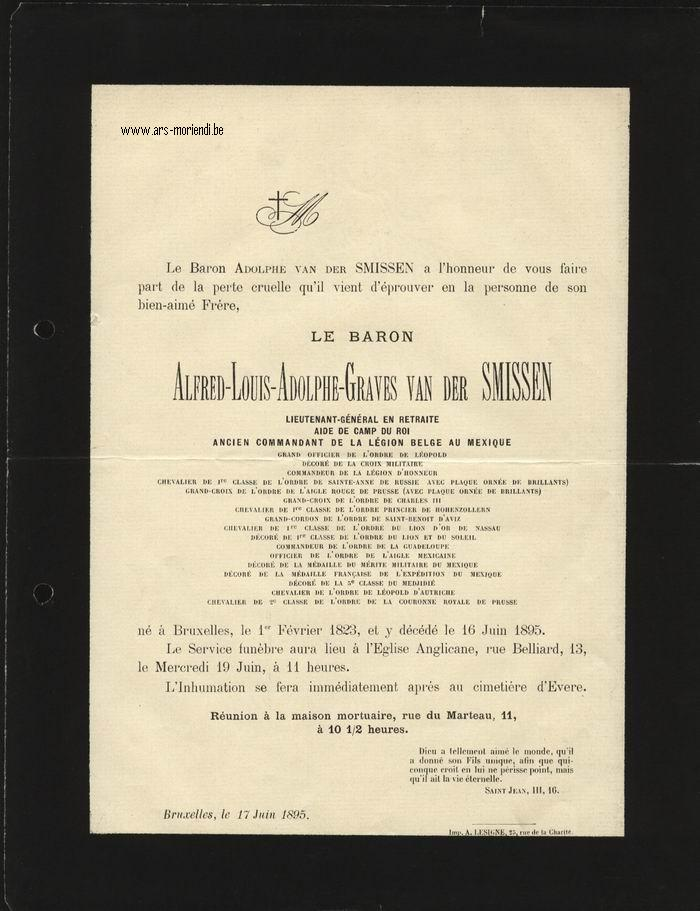
Death announcement of Alfred van der Smissen.

Alfred van der Smissen, 2nd Baron van der Smissen (1 February 1823 – 16 June 1895) was a Belgian general.

== Biography ==
He started his career in the French Foreign Legion before serving in the Belgian Legion in the Second Franco-Mexican War.

== Family ==
Alfred van der Smissen was the second son of Jacques Van der Smissen, 1st Baron van der Smissen, a Belgian artillery officer who enlisted in 1807 in Napoleon's Grande Armée, where he obtained the rank of major. His mother was Louise Catherine Colleton Graves, daughter of Rear Admiral Richard Graves (1758–1836) and niece of Thomas Graves, 1st Baron Graves, who took part in opposing the landing of the French expeditionary force of Jean-Baptiste-Donatien de Vimeur de Rochambeau near Yorktown.

== Issue ==
Although van der Smissen was never married, he had a long-time relationship with one Henriette Dubois (1825–1895), and they had a son, Alfred, born in Lille on 21 July 1855. Despite this, the elder Alfred never married Henriette. In fact, their relationship was eventually characterized by significant friction; in his final testament, van der Smissen referred to his son as "the grief of my life" and ultimately disinherited him in favor of his younger brother, Adolphe. The younger Alfred survived his father by six years, dying in Paris on 15 May 1901.

It is also widely believed by historians that van der Smissen had an affair with Empress Charlotte of Mexico and that the Belgian-born French general Maxime Weygand was the result of the affair, citing Weygand's strong physical resemblance to him.

== Honours and arms ==
- Grand Officer of the Order of Leopold
- Commander of the Legion of Honour
- Order of the Lion and the Sun First Class
- Order of the Medjidie Third Class
- Military Cross
- Order of Saint Anna, 1st class with diamonds
- Grand Cross of the Order of the Red Eagle
- Grand Cross of the Order of Charles III
- Cross of Honour 1st Class of the Princely House Order of Hohenzollern
- Order of Guadalupe
- Grand Cross of the Order of Aviz
- Order of the Gold Lion of the House of Nassau
- Imperial Order of the Mexican Eagle
- Commemorative medal of the Mexico Expedition
- Knight of the Order of Leopold (Austria)
- 2nd Class Order of the Crown (Prussia)

Coat of arms of Coat of arms of the van der Smissen family
Description Vert, a castle open argent and masoned sable, each tower surmounted by a hand-grenade sable fired or, in each bottom canton a pile of six roundels sable. Coronet A Belgian Baron's Coronet Motto Vestigia nulla retrorsum.

== Bibliography ==
- André Vander Mensbrugghe, « Alfred-Louis-Adolphe Vander Smissen », dans : Biographie nationale de Belgique, tome 22.
- Jacqueline Hons, « La légion belge au Mexique », Ami, n^{o} 26, novembre 1981.
- Eric Taladoire, Les contre-guérillas françaises dans les terres chaudes du Mexique (1862-1867), l'Harmattan 2016
- Charles Daubige, Les vestes rouges au Tamaulipas, 1876
- Modeste Loiseau, Le Mexique et la légion belge (1864-1867), Bruxelles : J. De Cocq, 1870
- Emile Walton, Souvenirs d’un officier belge au Mexique (1864-1866), Ch. Tanera Éditeur, Paris, 1868, p. 172
