= August von Jilek =

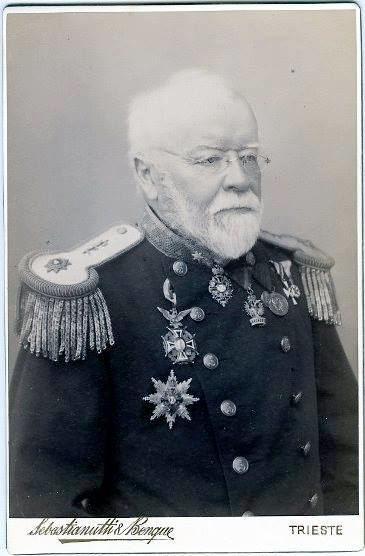
August von Jilek

August von Jilek (28 August 1819 – 8 November 1898), otherwise August Jilek or Jileck, was a naval doctor, lecturer, administrator and aristocrat (knight) from Austrian Empire.

== Early life and education ==
He was born at Litomyšl in Bohemia, Austrian Empire (now in the Czech Republic). He studied medicine at Vienna and after qualifying as a doctor he joined the Austrian Imperial-Royal Navy on 23 October 1845.

== Naval career ==
Nothing is known about Jilek's early years in the navy. He first came to prominence when he was chosen to fill the post of personal physician to the Archduke Ferdinand Maximilian (1832–1867). The occasion may have been Maximilian’s entry into the navy and service aboard SMS Novara in 1851.

In October 1852, Jilek was appointed senior doctor at the newly renamed Imperial and Royal Naval Academy (former Cadet College) at Trieste and Pola in Istria, now in Croatia, where he also lectured on oceanography. In March 1856 the Archduke Maximilian, by then Commander in Chief of the Navy, laid the foundation stones for a new Arsenal and a new Academy building at Fiume, and in July 1857 Jilek completed the textbook on oceanography for Academy students, for which he is best known today.

Title page of Jilek's Textbook of Oceanography (1857)

Jilek was not an original scientist in this field. He was probably commissioned by the Archduke to prepare a survey of the newly emerging science and that is what, within his limitations, he achieved. Much of the book is given over to general geographical descriptions of the world’s oceans, for which Jilek may have drawn on versions of Kant’s unpublished lectures on geography that were produced in the early 19th century. Another source was certainly Eduard Bobrik’s multi-volume manual of seamanship, navigation and oceanography – the first book to use that word in its title. In 1848 the second, revised edition of Bobrik’s manual had included sections on oceanography, hydrography, ‘aerography’ and magnetism. But time and again when Jilek addressed the major physical processes which govern the oceans, the true subject of oceanography, he was obliged to declare that no one yet understood them. However he made a reasonable job of explaining the methods and preliminary results that had recently been presented by Matthew Fontaine Maury in his Wind and Current Charts, and had then been enlarged upon in Maury’s masterpiece The Physical Geography of the Sea, first translated into German in 1856.

== Textbook on oceanography ==
Evidence for the diffusion of Maury’s ideas in the Austrian Navy after this point can be found in the narrative of the Novara’s circumnavigation (1857–1859), and in a more lucid exposition of them which was published at Pola in 1867. Notwithstanding the latter, Jilek’s textbook probably remained in use at the Academy for about twenty years.

Jilek’s unassuming guide was only the second German book, and perhaps the second in the world, to have the word ‘oceanography’ in its title. It is now extremely rare. None of the great national libraries of Europe or North America seems to have a copy, not even the Austrian National Library. Examples can be consulted at Barcelona, Chicago, Frankfurt and Kiel, and presumably several naval training colleges, maritime museums and institutes of oceanography also have copies. The one shown on this page formerly belonged to Lieutenant Ludwig von Czirer, a Hungarian who joined the Imperial-Royal Navy as a cadet in 1872.

On 4 October 1863 Jilek was transferred to administrative duties in the Ministry (later Department) of the navy, where he became director of the medical branch (1871) and rose to the rank of admiral (1 November 1888) before retiring in March 1894.

== Contributions to naval medicine ==
Jilek's achievements in naval medicine included the publication of two studies of malaria, a disease which was endemic to Istria, and in 1868 he wrote a report on gastroenteritis which may have been an internal Navy Department document. He oversaw the introduction of Listerian antisepsis and the professionalization of the service, that is, the replacement of the earlier ship's surgeons, often little more than medical orderlies, with fully qualified doctors.

Jilek's regular duties were partly or completely interrupted when he accompanied the Archduke on board SMS Novara for a botanical cruise to Brazil in 1860, then joined his household at the palace of Miramare outside Trieste, 130 km from Pola, and finally when he escorted his patron, now Emperor Maximilian I, to Mexico in 1864. Maximilian appointed two subsequent personal physicians during his brief reign in Mexico. Since Jilek had not left the service of Austria it is reasonable to assume that he returned directly from Veracruz with the Novara.

August married Cattarina von Reya Castelletto, but it is unknown if they had had children. He died at Trieste on 8 November 1898.

As a result of Jilek's trip to Brazil a species of passion flower, Passiflora jilekii Wawra, was named after him in 1863. He was knighted (Iron Cross) in 1867, but whether before or after Maximilian's execution on 19 June of that year is not known.
