= Antonio de la Mora =

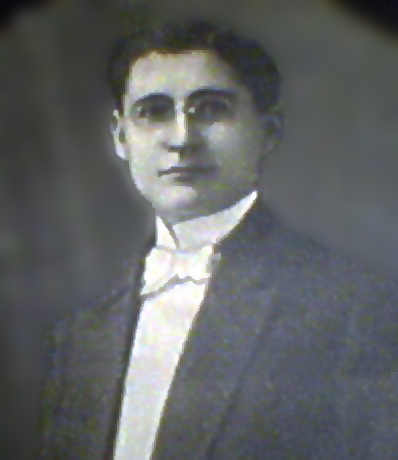
Antonio de la Mora Hernández

Antonio de la Mora y Hernández (12 March 1884 – 9 May 1926 Kansas City, Missouri) was a Mexican-born virtuoso cornetist, composer, music educator, publisher, and influential military band director who served as Chief Musician (aka bandmaster) in elite Army bands of three countries:

- In Mexico, the Mexican Army 6th Infantry Band
- In the United States:
  - The U.S. Army 21st Infantry Band stationed at Fort Logan, Colorado
  - The U.S. Army 20th Infantry Band at Fort Douglas, Utah, the Philippines (island of Mindanáo at Ludlow Barracks), Honolulu at Schofield Barracks, and El Paso, Texas, at Camp Cotton
- In Canada (as a U.S. citizen), the Canadian Expeditionary Force 97th Battalion Band

In De la Mora's post-military career, he served as an educator and bandmaster of YMCAs and Shriners of several cities. In particular, he organized (i) the amateur military band at the Salt Lake City YMCA in 1913, (ii) the Kem Shrine and YMCA of Grand Forks, North Dakota, and (iii) the Hamasa Temple Shrine Band of Meridian, Mississippi.

== Career highlights ==
UN ARTISTA MEXICANO
EN EL DESTIERRO
__________
Antonio de la Mora

Como suave racha primaveral empapada con los perfumados cármenes del Anáhuac recibí la noticia. Un hijo dilecto de la divina Euterpe, un inspirado artista aureolado con los multiformes destellos de los lauros, se Hallaba en esta ciudad, huyendo del tormentoso turbión político de México.
En gruesas titulares, "The Wichita Beacon", uno de los grandes rotativos de esta urbe así lo decía:
Tanto para saludar a un come patriota, como también con el fin de entrevistarlo en nombre de LA PRENSA, acudií inmediatamente a su céntrico domicilio, ubicado en entresuelo de la casa marcada con el número 135 1-2 N. Market.
En el apartamento se respiraba un ambiente musical. Un violín sobre una mesita, parecía invitar a la melódica región de los suenos de Paganini, y un flamante y esbelto cornetín daba la impresión vibrante de fanfarria guerrera. Un método aprisionado en metálico acentuaba la profesión del entrevistado que daba mano a su toilette después de la tibia caricia del baño.
—Sírvase decirme, señor De la Mora, —pregúntele después de hacer mi presentación, —cuál fué su actuación política en México.
—Afiliado al Partido Cooperatista, tomé parte en la formación de diversas agrupaciónes en la Metrópoli, que sostenían la candidatura de don Adolfo de la Huerta para la Presidencia de la República.
—El señor de la Huerta es amigo de Ud¿
—Desde hace 22 años que me ligan con el inquebrantables vínculos de amistad. Entre paréntesis la señora de la Huerta, antes de contraer matrimonio, fue mi discípula de piano.
—Desempeño Ud. algún puesto en la Administración Publica de nuestro país¿
—Uno de los más importantes en el ramo de Hacienda. Pero comenzó la compaña política, y todos los que militamos en las filas delahuertistas, fuimos cesados inmediatamente. Sobrevino la revolución, y los elementos civiles no dejamos de estar amagados hasta que por fin puse pies en polvorosa, y aquí me tiene Ud. en Estados Unidos.
—Es Ud. nativo del Estado de Sonora¿
—No, de la ciudad de Tepic. Si, he vivido en algunas poblaciones sonorenses. Tuve oportunidad de conocer al general Calles, cuando era tan solo humilde maestro de escuela.
Y como caudalosa vertiente, el señor De la Mora, propicio a las confidencias, vaciá en amena charla, variadas anécdotas de vivido color político.
Después rompiendo la estridencia incandecente del tópico electoral, me dice: Ahora, que conoce Ud. al político, uno de mis álbums de dirá quien es el músico. Véalo con detenimiento.
Y emergió el artista, el artífice maravilloso de innúmeros ritmos, el sabio profesor que ha dado brillo y lustre al nombre de México, en extranjeras tierras. Su excelente método titulado "El Alfabeto del Cornetín", es admirable en su genero, según la opinión de competentes profesores musicales.
Los 14 anos de 1900 a 1914 —que ha estado fuera del terruño aztecas los fragantes pétalos del triunfo han marcado su paso. En este país, desempeño acertadamente la dirección de una banda militar por espacio de 7 anos. En Canadá, durante 3 anos, tuvo otra banda militar a su mando ganando en un concurso el primer como solista de cornetín.
A su regreso a México, fue inspector general de bandas, organizando con los tranviarios metropolitanos, una excelente banda que daba los matinees en Chapultepec. Y sus conferencias sobre los instrumentos de boquilla circular son calurosamente aplaudidas: lo mismo que la adaptación e instrumentación de nuestras canciones vernáculas. Y veo que la figura del maestro se agiganta, que sus facciones se dulcifican, al sentirse sembrador de ritmos.
Afuera el grisáceo dombo de nublado cielo, enmarcaba et triste y puritano domingo, sin espectáculos y carente de la polifónica gama cadenciosa de las músicas.
Y añoré le "tierra de sangre y de broma," el paradisíaco vergel de la eterna primavera, empurpurado con la grana de las auroras y ennegrecido como el humo de la tragedia ....

A. MARTINEZ M.
Wichita, Kansas, abril, de 1924

— ____________________
("Un Artista Mexicano en el Destierro," La Prensa, San Antonio, Texas, April 22, 1924, p. 6)

De la Mora grew up in Tepic. He studied music at the National Conservatory of Music in Mexico City, completing in five years the regular eight years, graduating with distinction.

- 1895: Played solo cornet with a touring Mexican opera company under the direction of Assali. (Note: Assali – Biographical information on Assali is not known.)
- 1900: Cananea, the great copper camp, where he took charge of a music academy and organized a band.
- 1900: San Dimos, Durango, where he organized a band composed of native Mexicans and Indians.

=== Mexican Army ===
- 19??: Enlisted in the 6th Infantry of the Mexican Army and, right-away, was assigned as Bandmaster, a position he held for two years.

=== United States Army ===
- 1907: December 16, 1907, De la Mora enlisted in the 21st U.S. Infantry, initially at Jefferson Barracks Military Post near St. Louis as a musician at the rank of private.

=== 1908, Fort Logan, Colorado ===
In 1908, De la Mora was with the 21st Infantry Band stationed at Fort Logan – near Denver. The 21st Infantry Band, 4 years earlier based at Fort Snelling, under the direction of Charles W. Graves (born about 1864 Kenton, Ohio), was one of seven military bands selected to perform at the Saint Louis World Fair of 1904.

February 4, 1908, he was promoted to sergeant. On March 21, 1909, he was appointed Acting Chief Musician. On May 5, 1909, he was appointed chief musician and left the service December 16, 1909, at that position. He re-enlisted that same day, December 16, 1909, in the 20th Infantry at Fort Douglas, Utah – just a few miles east of Salt Lake City. He was appointed principal musician, pending the discharge of then bandmaster.

=== Around 1910, Philippines ===
Around 1910, while serving as vice head musician, he was with the 21st U.S. Infantry in the Philippines, on the island of Mindanáo at Ludlow Barracks. July 1, 1911, he was appointed chief musician.

While in the Philippines, De la Mora was on the "Sick List" of enlisted personnel: Admitted February 10, 1910, return to duty March 25, 1911, in Manilla. (note: when admitted, De La Mora was listed as being in the 20th Infantry)

=== Honolulu, Hawaii ===
September 4, 1911, De la Mora arrived in Honolulu from the Philippines aboard the U.S. Army Transport Sherman with his 19-piece military band. As head musician of the 20th Infantry Band, they performed in Hawaii as late as October 1911. He was discharged December 25, 1911.

=== Salt Lake City ===
De a Mora Organized an amateur military band at the Salt Lake City Y.M.C.A. in 1913.

=== 1914, El Paso, Texas ===
Beginning towards the end of 1913, and throughout 1914, De la Mora and the 20th Infantry Band, with the 20th Regiment from Fort Douglas, was stationed at Camp Cotton, a sub-post of Fort Bliss in El Paso. The 20th Infantry Band was on patrol duty on the Mexican border.

==== Other units at Camp Cotton ====
- Camp Cotton – named for its locale in the Cotton subdivision in the southeastern part of El Paso – was, in 1913, a newly established military camp that, initially, hosted the 20th Infantry, the 12th Cavalry squadron of 4 troops and C troop of the 13th Cavalry.
- In July 1912, the 16th Infantry returned from its second tour in the Philippines for duty at the Presidio in San Francisco. Two years later, the regiment was transferred with the 8th Brigade, commanded by General "Black Jack" Pershing, to the Mexican border to help secure it from depredations by Mexican bandits and paramilitary forces commanded by Francisco "Pancho" Villa. Upon arrival in April 1914, the regiment was posted to Camp Cotton. In response to Pancho Villa's attack on Columbus, New Mexico, March 1916 – about 80 miles west of El Paso – President Woodrow Wilson ordered Pershing conduct a punitive expedition into Mexico to hunt, find, and punish Pancho Villa (see Pancho Villa Expedition).

=== Conservatory of Mérida ===
- The School of Music of the State of Yucatan was inaugurated November 30, 1911, in Mérida. Shortly thereafter, it was renamed Conservatorio de Mérida. Francisco Quevedo was its first director. Antonio de la Mora, one of the founding music professors, taught counterpoint and instrumentation.

=== Canadian Expeditionary Force ===
Before the United States entered World War I, the Canadian Expeditionary Force recruited Americans to fill ranks of the 97th Battalion, one of five American Legion battalions that had greatly deteriorated. The other four battalions were the 212th, the 211th, the 213th, and the 237th.

- April 10, 1916, De la Mora enlisted in the Canadian Expeditionary Force at Windsor, and, on the same day received a medical examination.
- April 26, 1916, De la Mora was promoted to Sergeant in the 97th Overseas Battalion, Canadian Expeditionary Force, at Toronto, and was appointed Bandmaster.
- May 12, 1916, De la Mora was transferred to the 212th Battalion at Toronto
- May 19, 1916, De la Mora was promoted to Band Sergeant 212th and assigned to Winnipeg, where he served as Bandmaster.
- January 3, 1917, De la Mora received a Medical Discharge.

=== Grand Forks, North Dakota ===
- De la Mora became a member of the Kem Shrine of Grand Forks.
- 1916–1917: Grand Forks, North Dakota, Professor De la Mora, Bandmaster of:

The YMCA Boys Band
Kem Temple Shriners Band
Elks Saxophone Band
East Grand Forks Band

=== Meridian, Mississippi ===
De la Mora resided in Meridian, Mississippi, for a few months during 1918. While there, he published his book, Cornetist Alphabet, and organized the Hamasa Temple Shrine Band. He remained in Meridian until about late-November-early-December when he married Susan May Stennis (maiden; 1899–1973) in Meridian and, with her, moved to New Orleans for his work as a musician. When he signed his World War I Draft Registration on September 12, 1818, he provided the name of his wife, Amanda de la Mora, and his address at 817 24th Avenue (between 8th and 9th Streets), Meridian, Mississippi, an address that corresponds to the site upon which the Hamasa Temple was built in 1924. The Meridian Shriners contracted the Saenger organization to design, build, and operate the auditorium in their building. The Saenger organization was the same organization that designed, built, owned, and operated the Strand in New Orleans, where De la Mora began working in 1918.

=== Strand Theatre Orchestra, New Orleans ===
Beginning late-November-early-December 1918, De la Mora worked as a musician in New Orleans in the Concert Orchestra under the direction of Don Philippini (né Salvatore Philippini; 1870–1950) of the recently built Strand Theater. The Strand, no longer in existence, was at the corner of Baronne and Gravier Streets for about 53 years. (Note: The theater, designed by Favrot & Livaudais, opened in 1917 by the Saenger Amusement Company featuring its own concert orchestra and Wurlitzer Style 4 organ. In 1937, it became the Joy Theatre (owned by Joy Houck). After the 1950s, it was razed.)

On February 9, 1919, De la Mora seemingly tried to commit suicide by leaping eighteen feet to the street from the second-story window of the newspaper editorial room of the New Orleans States (Note: The New Orleans States was the name of the newspaper in 1919 and endured under that name until July 23, 1933, when it was renamed Times-Picayune New Orleans States, a name that endured until September 14, 1958. Robert Ewing was the publisher in 1919.) building at 619 Canal Street. News accounts attributed De la Mora's distress to a prior nervous breakdown from overwork and marital unhappiness relating to disagreements with in-laws. De la Mora, about two months earlier, had married Susan May Stennis (maiden; 1899–1973) in Meridian, Mississippi. Soon after marrying, they moved to New Orleans and resided at 611 St. Charles Street (at Lafayette Square).

=== Wichita, Kansas ===
EMPLEOS

Músicos Mexicanos entra 18 y 35 anos de edad para trabajar en la Cudahy Packing Co. y tocar con la banda mexicana que sé está organizado bajo la dirección del Prof. Antonio de la Mora, en Wichita, Kans. Trabajo ligero pagos desde $3.20 diarios Instrumentos que más falta hacen: Soprano Saxophon-primer, clarinete, primer cornetín, 1er alto o corno, dos trombones de vara, baterías. Tendrán que pagar su pasaje y traer sus instrumentos. Se prefieren que sepan leer. STANDARD MUSIC, 2239 No. Laurel St., Mr. A. de la Mora, Wichita, Kans.

— ____________________
(advertisement, La Prensa, San Antonio, Texas, July 19, 1925, p. 7)

In 1925, Antonio de la Mora was living in Wichita, Kansas, at 1665 North Waco Avenue with his wife, Martha, and two sons, Antonio, Jr., and Adolphus. He was working there as a music teacher. He resided with his family at 2239 North Laurel Street.

=== Kansas City, Missouri ===
De la Mora moved to Kansas City, Missouri, around December 1925 to organize the Mexican Band of the Unión Cultural Mexicana (U.C.M.) in Kansas City's Westside at 1017 West 24th Street. He trained a 45-piece band composed mostly of youth from the community. De la Mora, with Martha (1903–1983), Antonio, Jr. (1922–1985), and Adolfo (born 1934) – his wife and two sons – resided at 2322 Monitor Place. The Mexican communities in Wichita and Kansas City were viewed somewhat as colonies for Mexican exiles.

==== Death in Kansas City, Missouri ====
Antonio de la Mora died May 9, 1926. Dr. Nicolás Jaime (1885–1965) (surname pronounced "high-me" with the accent evenly divided) was the attending physician who signed the death certificate. He and Dr. Othoniel de Rivas y Jaén (1890–1973), a Granada, Nicaragua-born chiropractor, held a funeral vigil for Antonio de la Mora May 22, 1926, at the U.C.M.

Dr. Jaime, a co-founder of the U.C.M., 73 days earlier had signed a US$2,500 bail bond (equivalent to US$45,465 in 2025) for Jorge Prieto Laurens (1895–1990), who was elected and served as interim governor of San Luis Potosí in 1923 for one year, was indicted in San Antonio and arrested on February 28, 1926, in Kansas City, on a charge by the Mexican government that he had, as part of the Huerta faction, participated in a plot to overthrow (another revolution) the then present Mexican regime, a government for which, diplomatically, the United States was on friendly terms. Dr. Jaime, himself, was a 1915 Mexican exile. But as a community member, in 1958, he was named "Man of the Year" by the Kansas City Academy of General Practice.

=== Memorial band ===
In 1927, after the death of Antonio de la Mora, the "Antonio de la Mora Band," directed by Alfredo Antonio González Flores (1904–1983), continued to perform in Kansas City. González, who had arrived early 1904 in Kansas City to assist with teaching music in the Mexican community, went on to become an influential music educator at Universidad Juárez del Estado de Durango.

== Selected compositions ==
Carl Fischer

1. "President Wilson's March," 4to
  © 22 April 1913
  2nd copy 26 April 1913
  Antonio de la Mora, Fort Douglas, Utah
  Class E (musical composition) 309389
  OCLC 451013732
  Note: President Woodrow Wilson became U.S. President March 4, 1913

Antonio de la Mora

2. "Salt Lake Beauties," waltz
  © 21 March 1913
  2nd copy 25 March 1913
  Antonio de la Mora, Fort Douglas, Utah
  Class E (musical composition) 308857
  OCLC 497747059, 1099878051
3. "Captain Tiffany," march, 4to
  © 11 May 1909
  A. de la Mora, Fort Logan, Colorado
  Class C (musical composition) 207274
  Dedicated to (then Captain) George Stanton Tiffany, 21st Infantry (1876–1938)
4. "Colonel Williams," march, 4to
  © 7 October 1908
  Antonio de la Mora, Fort Logan, Colorado
  Class C (musical composition) 190912
  Dedicated to De la Mora's then commanding officer in the 20th Infantry, Colonel Charles Andrew Williams (1852–1926), 21st Infantry
  Fort Logan, Colorado

Other

5. "The Twentieth United States Infantry," march (1913)
6. "Carnival of Mérida" ("Carnaval de Mérida") a phantasy
7. "Gretchen," dance intermezzo
8. "Lolita," mazurka
9. "Ducat March" (1911)
  Dedicated to Lieutenant Colonel Arthur Charles Ducat, Jr. (1856–1913), of the 20th Infantry, son of Civil War Union Officer Arthur Charles Ducat, Sr.
10. "Serenade, 'To a Violet'" (1912)
11. "Remembrance of Mexico," Mexican dance (1912)

== Published works ==
- Cornetist's Alphabet – for Amateurs, Advanced Players, and Professionals, by Antonio A. de La Mora (1984–1926), De La Mora Publishing Company, Meridian, Mississippi (1918), Sherman Clay, agents; OCLC 12956929
- Cornetist's Weekly Technical Review, De La Mora Publishing Company, Meridian, Mississippi (1918)

== Marriages ==
Antonio de la Mora probably married five times and had six children.

- Marie Louise Denner (maiden; 1892–1968) and De la Mora married June 5, 1912, Salt Lake City, Utah. Marie filed for divorce June 14, 1916, in Salt Lake City, alleging non-support for the prior 5 months. In her divorce petition, she asked for alimony and custody of their three children. The petition gave Antonio's last known address at Huron Street, Toledo, Ohio Divorce was granted September 9, 1916, giving alimony and custody of the 3 children to Marie. Note that no-fault divorce was not an option in the United States until 1969, when it was first introduced in California. No-fault divorce became an option in Utah in 1987. All three children eventually changed their surname to that of Denner's 2nd husband, Wallace Creighton Welch (1882–1955). The three children were:
  - Otto Francis (de la Mora) Welch (1913–1988) went on to enlist three tours in the U.S. Armed Forces, totaling 14 years, 5 months: 11 months in the Army, from, July 1, 1932, to June 30, 1933; 10 years in the Army, from October 28, 1938, to March 11, 1949; and 3 years in the Air Force, from March 11, 1949, to June 3, 1952.
  - Marianne Clara (de la Mora) Welch (1914–1978) married on July 18, 1936, Charles Edward Kennamer (1906–1937), an Army enlistee stationed at Schofield Barracks in Honolulu, Hawaii. Marianne was, at the time, living with her mother and stepfather, Warrant Officer Wallace Creighton Welch (1882–1955), who was also stationed there. Kennamer died 11 months later, after a prolonged illness. Marianne then married on October 16, 1937, Francis Regis Herald, Sr. (1912–1977), a 1935 graduate of West Point.
  - Iris Mary (de la Mora) Welch (1915–1996) married on June 14, 1938, William Emmett Ekman (1913–1979), a 1938 graduate of West Point who, in 1965, became a brigadier general before retiring in 1966. In 1968, Ekman was awarded the Army Distinguished Service Medal.
- Amande Elisabeth Hébert (maiden; 1901–1956) and De la Mora married August 5, 1916, Winnipeg, Canada
- Susan May Stennis (maiden; 1899–1973) and De la Mora married late November or early December 1918, Meridian, Mississippi. They were divorced before the end of 1919. Her father, Joseph Dudley Stennis (1863–1934) was a farmer and prominent member of the Meridian community. From 1895 to 1915, he served as a representative for Lauderdale County in the House of Representative of the Mississippi Legislature. In 1915, J.D. Stennis ran for governor, losing to Theodore G. Bilbo. Susan Stennis, by way of great-grandparents – John Stennis (1785–1845) and Mary Peden (1794–1826) – was a second cousin of U.S. Senator John C. Stennis.
- Martha Montaño Bosques (1903–1983), aka María Montaño, and De la Mora married around 1921. She was a school teacher who had studied in Toluca. Antonio had three children with her:
  - Antonio de la Mora, Jr. (1922–1985)
  - Adolphus de la Mora (1924– ) was born in Mexico after Antonio de la Mora's death.
  - Carlos Jorge de la Mora (1926– )
- Adela de la Mora (maiden not known) and Antonio de la Mora were apparently married, but the dates are not known.

== Notable students ==
- James Eugene Stuchbery (1894–1978), a cornetist, who had studied with Prof. de la Mora, went on to become a member of the Houston Symphony and was the founding and longstanding band director of the Pasadena High School Band in Texas. In 1968, in Pasadena, the Stuchbery Elementary School was named in his honor.
