= British Legion (disambiguation) =

British Legion can refer to any of the following:

- Royal British Legion, a British charity that provides support to military veterans
- Royal British Legion Industries, a British charity, not affiliated with the Royal British Legion, which helps military veterans along with disabled and unemployed people
- British Legion (1860), a volunteer military unit composed of English and Scottish volunteers who fought for the unification of Italy from 1860 to 1861
- British Legion (American Revolutionary War), a Loyalist cavalry unit which fought in the American Revolutionary War from 1777 to 1782
- British Legions (Spanish: Legión Británica), British volunteer units which fought against Spain in the Spanish American wars of independence

== Other uses ==
- British Auxiliary Legion, a British expeditionary force sent to Spain in 1835 to fight in the First Carlist War
- British German Legion, a unit of German troops recruited to fight for Britain in the Crimean War from 1855 to 1856
- British Legion Volunteer Police Force, a short-lived police force established in response to the outcome of the Munich Agreement in September 1938
- Legio II Britannica (Roman Empire); see List of Roman legions

== See also ==
- List of military legions
- American Legion (disambiguation)
- French Legion (disambiguation)
- German Legion (disambiguation)
- Legion (disambiguation)
