= German Legion =

German Legion may refer to:

- Legio I Germanica (48 BC – AD 70), a legion in the Roman army
- King's German Legion (1803–1816), a unit of the British Army
- Russian–German Legion (1812–1815), a unit of the Imperial Russian Army and, later, the Prussian Army
- German Legion (Philhellenes) (c. 1823), a unit of volunteers from Germany in the Greek War of Independence, at the call of Friedrich Thiersch
- German Democratic Legion (1849–1849), a unit involved in the Revolution of 1848 in Baden
- British German Legion (1853–1856), a unit of the British Army in the Crimean War
- Independent Battalion of New York Volunteer Infantry (1862–1864), also known as German Legion, a unit of the Union Army during the American Civil War
- German Legion (1919), a unit of the Freikorps in the Baltic
- Condor Legion (1936-1939), a unit of volunteers from Germany in the Spanish Civil War

== See also ==
- List of military legions
- French Legion (disambiguation)
- British Legion (disambiguation)
- American Legion (disambiguation)
- Legion (disambiguation)
- Ostlegionen (Eastern Legions)
