= French Legion =

The French Legion may refer to:

- French Foreign Legion
- Legion of Honour of France
- Legion of French Volunteers Against Bolshevism
- Czechoslovak Legion in France
- French Armenian Legion
- Legion of France, see Boer foreign volunteers

== See also ==
- French Foreign Legion (disambiguation)
- 2nd Foreign Legion (France)
- List of military legions
- List of Roman legions
- American Legion (disambiguation)
- British Legion (disambiguation)
- German Legion (disambiguation)
- Legion (disambiguation)
