= 218th (Edmonton) Battalion, CEF =

218th Battalion, CEF
- Active: 1916–1917
- Country: Canada
- Branch: Canadian Expeditionary Force
- Type: Infantry
- Mobilization headquarters: Edmonton
- Battle honours: The Great War, 1916–17

Commanders
- Officer commanding: LCol James Cornwall

The 218th Battalion, CEF, was a unit in the Canadian Expeditionary Force during the First World War. Based in Edmonton, Alberta, the unit began recruiting in early 1916 in that city.

On October 11, 1916, soldiers from the 218th Battalion led an effort to overcome the local police in Calgary. "The city virtually is in the hands of the soldier mob." Sergeant Morris "Two Gun" Cohen was implicated as a leader of the events during a series of trials held in the city; however, he was acquitted after successfully defending himself in court.

On February 8, 1917, after the unit was formally re-formed, soldiers from the former battalion rioted in Calgary after being ordered to depart immediately for Europe. They attacked 14 stores, restaurants and cafés throughout the city.

After sailing to England in February 1917, the battalion was reorganised as the 8th Battalion, Canadian Railway Troops. The 218th Battalion, CEF, had one officer commanding: Lieutenant-Colonel J. K. "Peace River Jim" Cornwall.

The King's and Regimental Colours of the 218th Battalion were deposited in All Saints' Pro-Cathedral but were destroyed in a fire in 1919. In 1921, replicas of the colours were laid up in the rotunda of the Alberta Legislature Building in Edmonton.

In 1929, the battalion was awarded the theatre of war honour The Great War, 1916–17.

== See also ==
- List of riots and civil unrest in Calgary
- Andrew Shandro (politician), the first Ukrainian Canadian to be elected to the Alberta Legislature, enlisted in the 218th Battalion in early 1917.
- 97th Battalion (American Legion), CEF
- 211th Battalion (American Legion), CEF
- 212th Battalion (American Legion), CEF
- 237th Battalion (American Legion), CEF
