= My Name Is Legion =

My Name Is Legion may refer to:

- Legion (demons), a group of demons in the New Testament
- My Name Is Legion (novel), a 2004 novel by A. N. Wilson
- My Name Is Legion (short story collection), a 1976 short story collection by Roger Zelazny
- O Meu Nome é Legião (My Name Is Legion), a 2007 novel by António Lobo Antunes

== See also ==
- I Am Legion (disambiguation)
- Legion (disambiguation)
