= List of military legions =

This list of military legions is in chronological order where possible. In modern times, most units using the name "military legions" were composed of soldiers from a specific ethnic, national, religious or ideological background, and that background is often specified in the legion's name. Since the Napoleonic Wars, many countries have used the term "legionnaire" to refer to recruits who are neither citizens nor imperial subjects of the government whose military they enter. These governments often, but do not always, group these foreign recruits into specific units that bear the name "legion."

== Ancient Rome ==
- List of Roman legions
  - Theban Legion, a Roman legion whose members, according to a long-lasting tradition, were massacred for their Christian beliefs

== 18th century ==
=== American Revolutionary War ===
- Lee's Legion, a military unit of the Continental Army
- Pulaski's Legion, a cavalry regiment of the Continental Army
- Armand's Legion, a dragoon unit of the Continental Army
- British Legion (American Revolutionary War), a military unit of British Provincial Corps
- Lauzun's Legion, a military unit of the French Royal Army

=== French Revolutionary and Napoleonic Wars ===
- Légion des Allobroges, an infantry unit of French Revolutionary Army consisting of Swiss and Italian volunteers
- Batavian Legion, an infantry unit of French Revolutionary Army consisting of Dutch volunteers
- Belgian Legion (1792), an infantry unit of French Revolutionary Army consisting of Belgian volunteers
- Legion of Belgians and Liégeois, an infantry unit of French Revolutionary Army consisting of Belgian volunteers
- Irish Legion, an infantry unit of French Army consisting of Irish volunteers
- King's German Legion, a military formation of the British Army consisting of Hanoverian volunteers
- Légion Noire, an infantry unit of the French Revolutionary Army
- Polish Legions (Napoleonic era), units of the French Army consisting of Polish volunteers
- Russian–German Legion, a military formation of the Imperial Russian Army consisting of German, Dutch and Belgian volunteers

=== Other 18th century legions ===
- French Revolutionary Legion, an American mercenary force consisting of Anglophone and Francophone volunteers
- Legion of the United States, a temporary reorganization of the United States Army during the Northwest Indian War

== 19th century ==
- Belgian Legion, the name of several units of Belgian volunteers who fought in various 19th century conflicts
- British Legions, foreign volunteer units, established in 1819, who fought against Spain in South America's independence wars
- British German Legion, a group of German soldiers recruited to fight for Britain in the Crimean War, 1855–1856
- Greek Legion (Septinsular Republic), a Septinsular Republic unit active between 1805 and 1807, taking part in the War of the Third Coalition and the Russo-Turkish War (1806–1812)
- Royal Foreign Legion (Légion royal étrangère), infantry corps of mostly German mercenaries forming part of the restored French Bourbon army in 1815, renamed the Hohenlohe Regiment after 1821
- British Legion (1835), officially the Auxiliary Legion, a British military force sent to Spain to support the Liberals and Queen Isabella II against the Carlists in the First Carlist War
- Italian Legion, commanded by Garibaldi in the Uruguayan Civil War
- Academic Legion (Vienna), a revolutionary students' group in Vienna in 1848
- Academic Legion (Lviv), Polish nationalist students at the University of Lviv in 1848
- Greek Volunteer Legion, helping Russia in the Crimean War
- International Legion, a military force formed by Garibaldi in 1860 during the wars of Italian unification
  - The British Legion (1860) British contingent of the above
- Nauvoo Legion, a significant militia in early Mormon history
- List of American Civil War legions, both Confederate and Union
- Guelphic Legion, Hanoverian paramilitary unit supporting George V, deposed king of Hanover, from 1866 to 1870
- Carabinieri legions, the regional units of the Italian gendarmerie, established following the unification of the country.

== 20th century ==
=== World War I ===
- Czechoslovak Legions, Czech and Slovak volunteer forces fighting on the Allied Powers side
- French Armenian Legion, part of the French Army; also involved in the Franco-Turkish War of 1918–21
- Georgian Legion (1914–1918), a unit of the German Army recruited from Georgians
- Infantry Regiment of the Academic Legion, formed by volunteer Polish students in 1918, later taken into the regular Polish Army
- Italian Legione Redenta, an Italian military formation that participated in the Siberian Intervention during the Russian Civil War
- Jewish Legion, in the British Army at Gallipoli and Palestine
- Polish Legion in Finland, fighting for the Finns against the Russians
- Polish Legions in World War I, part of the Austro-Hungarian Army
- Puławy Legion, a Polish formation that was part of the Imperial Russian Army
- Legion of Ukrainian Sich Riflemen, a corps of the Austro-Hungarian Army

=== Interwar period ===
- 2nd Legions Infantry Division (Poland), elite unite of the Polish Army, mostly composed of veterans of the Polish Legions in World War I
- Condor Legion, a unit of "volunteers" from the German Luftwaffe serving with the Nationalists during the Spanish Civil War
- British Legion Volunteer Police Force, a short-lived police force established in response to the outcome of the Munich Agreement in September 1938
- Aviazione Legionaria, Italian air force in the Spanish Civil War

=== World War II ===
- Czechoslovak Legion opposing the Germans in Poland, 1939

Note: Except for the above, all World War II legions fought on the German side.

- Free Arabian Legion, Arab volunteers, notably from Iraq, and North Africa fighting on the German side.
- Armenian or Armenische Legion, name given to the 812th Armenian Battalion of the German Army, made up largely of Armenian Red Army prisoners of war
- Azerbaijani Legion (Azerbaijan legion), made up largely of Azerbaijani Red Army prisoners of war
- Blue Legion, Spanish volunteers fighting against the Soviet Union on the Eastern Front
- Crna Legija (Black Legion), the name given to the 1st and 5th Croatian Ustaše Brigades
- Croatian Legion
- Croatian Air Force Legion
- Croatian Anti-Aircraft Legion
- Croatian Naval Legion
- Estonian Legion, a unit in the Waffen SS created in 1942, mainly consisting of Estonian soldiers
- Flemish Legion (Dutch: Vlaams Legioen), recruited among Dutch-speaking volunteers from German-occupied Belgium, notably from Flanders.
- Walloon Legion (French: Légion Wallonie), recruited among French-speaking volunteers from German-occupied Belgium.
- Légion française des combattants (French Legion of Fighters), a pro-Nazi Vichy French unit
- Legion of French Volunteers Against Bolshevism (LVF), pro-Nazi French
- Georgian Legion (1941–1945), a unit of the German army recruited from Georgians
- Indische Legion, also known as the Free India Legion or Tiger Legion, an Indian unit raised in 1941 and attached to the German Army
- Latvian Legion, a formation of the Waffen-SS created in 1943 and consisting primarily of ethnic Latvians
- Legion of St. George, the original name of the British Free Corps
- Ostlegionen (literally "Eastern Legions"), conscripts and volunteers from the occupied eastern territories recruited into the German Army
- La Légion Tricolore, a pro-Nazi French unit which was absorbed into the LVF after six months
- Volga Tatar Legion, one of several units formed by the Wehrmacht out of Soviet prisoners of war according to their ethnicity

=== Other ===
- Arab Legion (al-Jaysh al-Arabī) (1920–56), the regular army of Transjordan, predecessor of the present Jordanian Army
- Foreign legion (disambiguation)
  - French Foreign Legion, a unit of the French Army mainly composed of foreigners wishing to fight for France (1831–present)
- Polish Legions (disambiguation), eleven units at different times between the 18th and 20th centuries (some of which are listed separately above)
- Spanish Legion, an elite unit of the Spanish Army (1920–present)

== 21st century ==
- International Legion of Territorial Defence of Ukraine, a volunteer foreign legion military unit created by the Government of Ukraine to fight in the 2022 Russian invasion of Ukraine

== See also ==
- Belgian Legion or Légion Belge, original name of the Secret Army, the largest organization in the Belgian Resistance to the German World War II occupation of the country
- National Legion, a far right Belgian paramilary and political movement in the 1920s and 1930s, headed by Paul Hoornaert
- Caribbean Legion, active in Central American politics of the 1950s
- White Legion, a Georgian guerrilla group in Abkhazia after the Georgian regular army's defeat in the War in Abkhazia
