= International Legion =

International Legion may refer to:

- International Legion (Italy)
- International Legion (proposed)
- International Legion (Ukraine)
