= Foreign legion =

Foreign Legion most often refers to:

- French Foreign Legion, a unit of the French Army

Foreign Legion may also refer to:

== Military ==
- Brigade of Gurkhas, light infantry unit of the British Army
- Foreign volunteers, a term for troops joining a foreign army
- International Brigades, of the Spanish Civil War
- International Legion, created in 1860 by Giuseppe Garibaldi
- International Freedom Battalion, a leftist foreign fighters fighting for the Rojava forces during the Syrian Civil War
- International Legion of Territorial Defense of Ukraine, a Ukrainian brigade created during the 2022 Russian invasion of Ukraine
- King's German Legion (KGL), a British Army unit of expatriate Germans during the Napoleonic Wars
- Mahal (Israel), foreigners serving in the Israeli army
- Polish Legions (Napoleonic period), Polish military units that served with the French Army, 1790s–1810s
- Portuguese Legion (Napoleonic Wars), a Portuguese military force in Napoleon's Imperial Armies
- Rhodesian Light Infantry, informally known as Rhodesian Foreign Legion (1961–1980)
- Royal Dutch East Indies Army (KNIL), informally known as Dutch Foreign Legion (1830–1950)
- Royal Sicilian Regiment (1806–1816)
- Russian–German Legion, a Russian Army unit of expatriate German personnel during the Napoleonic Wars
- Spanish Legion, a quasi-independent unit of the Spanish Army
- Värvat främlingsregemente, Recruited Foreigners Regiment, Swedish regiment of Polish deserters
- YPG International, foreign legion branches of the People's Protection Units (YPG).

== Entertainment ==
- The Foreign Legion, a 1928 silent film
- Foreign Legion (band), a punk band from Wales
- Foreign Legion (album), a 2001 album by Fluid Ounces
- Foreign Legion, a 2010 album by Tin Hat
- Foreign Legion (wrestling) (La Legión Extranjera), a loosely affiliated group in Mexican wrestling
- Foreign Legions, a 2001 anthology edited by David Drake

== See also ==
- Abbott and Costello in the Foreign Legion, a 1950 film
- Tarzan and the Foreign Legion, a 1947 novel by Edgar Rice Burroughs
- French Foreign Legion (disambiguation)
- Legion (disambiguation)
- Military legions
