= Mentat (disambiguation) =

A mentat is a profession in the fictional Dune universe created by Frank Herbert.

Mentat may also refer to:

- Mentat (computing), a C++ macro-dataflow extension
- Mentat (company), a software company acquired by Packeteer in 2004
- Mentat (software), preprocessor and postprocessor of MSC Marc software finite element analyses
- Mentats, fictional drugs in the Fallout video game series
- The Mentat, a school for mental arts in the 1995 science fiction novel The Search for Snout
