= Fort Logan (disambiguation) =

Fort Logan may refer to:

== Places ==
- Fort Logan (Colorado), an 1887-1946 Army installation located southwest of Denver, Colorado
- Fort Logan, Colorado, a neighborhood of Englewood, Colorado named for the former fort
- Fort Logan and Blockhouse, a Montana site on the National Register of Historic Places

== Other uses ==
- Fort Logan Elementary School at Englewood, Colorado § Education
- Fort Logan National Cemetery, the remaining federal site of the fort
