= American Legion Memorial Bridge =

American Legion Memorial Bridge may refer to:

- American Legion Memorial Bridge (Michigan) in Traverse City, Michigan, U.S.
- American Legion Memorial Bridge (Potomac River), linking the western half of the Capital Beltway (I-495) between Maryland and Virginia, U.S.

== See also ==
- American Legion (disambiguation)
