= Roman legion (disambiguation) =

Roman legion may refer to:

- Roman legion, a type of army unit of Ancient Rome
  - List of Roman legions
- Roman army, The Legions or The Roman Legions, the army of Ancient Rome
- Roman Legion (1941–1943), an Aromanian World War II political and paramilitary organization in Greece supporting the Axis occupation of the country

== See also ==
- List of military legions
- Roman Legion-Hare (1955 film) an animated short film featuring Bugs Bunny
