= French Foreign Legion (disambiguation) =

The French Foreign Legion (Légion étrangère) is a corps of the French Army, established in 1831.

French Foreign Legion may also refer to:

- 1st Foreign Legion, Kingdom of France; see Origins of the French Foreign Legion
- 2nd Foreign Legion (France), Kingdom of France
- French Foreign Legion (song), a 1958 song

== See also ==
- List of French Foreign Legion units
- History of the French Foreign Legion
- French Foreign Legion Veteran Societies Federation
- French Foreign Legion in popular culture
- French Legion, several organisations
- Foreign legion (disambiguation)
