= Legion Park =

Legion Park may refer to:

- American Legion Memorial Park, Everett, Washington
- Centene Stadium (Great Falls, Montana); formerly Legion Park (1940-2007)
- Mort Glosser Amphitheater, Gadsden, Alabama; formerly Legion Park Bowl
- Legion State Park, Louisville, Mississippi
- Sims Legion Park, Gastonia, North Carolina

== See also ==
- Legion Field, Birmingham, Alabama
- Legion Field (Greenville, Mississippi)
- Kindrick Legion Field, Helena, Montana
