= American Legion (disambiguation) =

American Legion may refer to:

== Military ==
- American Legion, a U.S. war veterans' organization
- American Legion (Great Britain), a British provincial regiment that served in the American Revolutionary War under the command of Benedict Arnold
- American Legion (CEF), the name given to units composed of Americans who served in the Canadian Expeditionary Force (CEF) during World War I
  - 97th Battalion (American Legion), CEF
  - 212th Battalion (American Legion), CEF
  - 237th Battalion (American Legion), CEF

== Places ==
- American Legion Memorial Bridge (Michigan) in Traverse City, Michigan, United States
- American Legion Memorial Bridge (Potomac River), linking the western half of the Capital Beltway (I-495) between Maryland and Virginia, United States

== Other uses ==
- SS American Legion (1919), a passenger ship
- Silver Legion of America, an American White Nationalist group

== See also ==
- American Legion Auxiliary
- American Legion Baseball
- Legion of the United States
- Sons of the American Legion
- List of military legions
- American Lesion, an album by Greg Gaffin
