= Belgian Legion =

Military unit

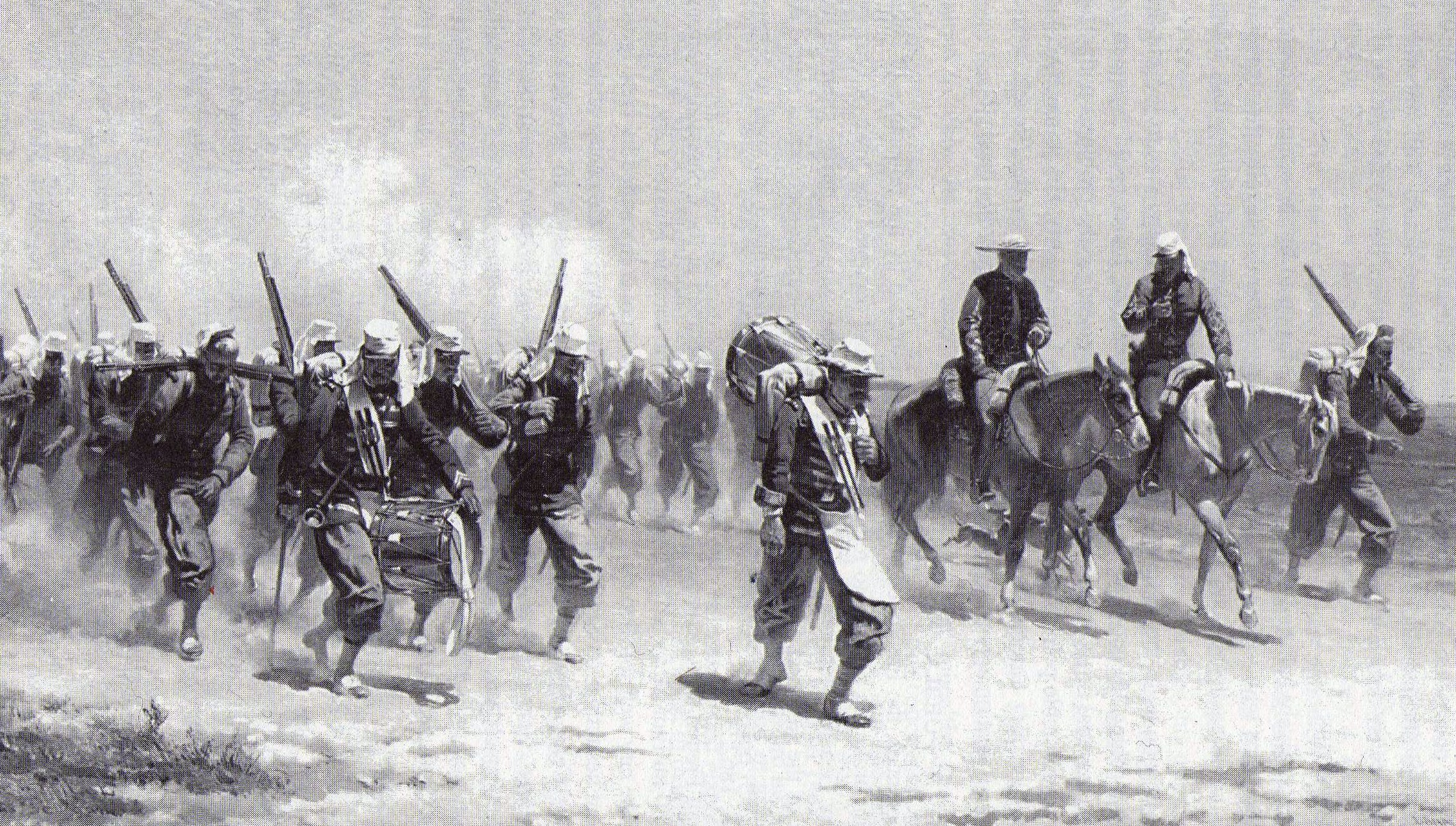
Belgian Legion in Mexico.

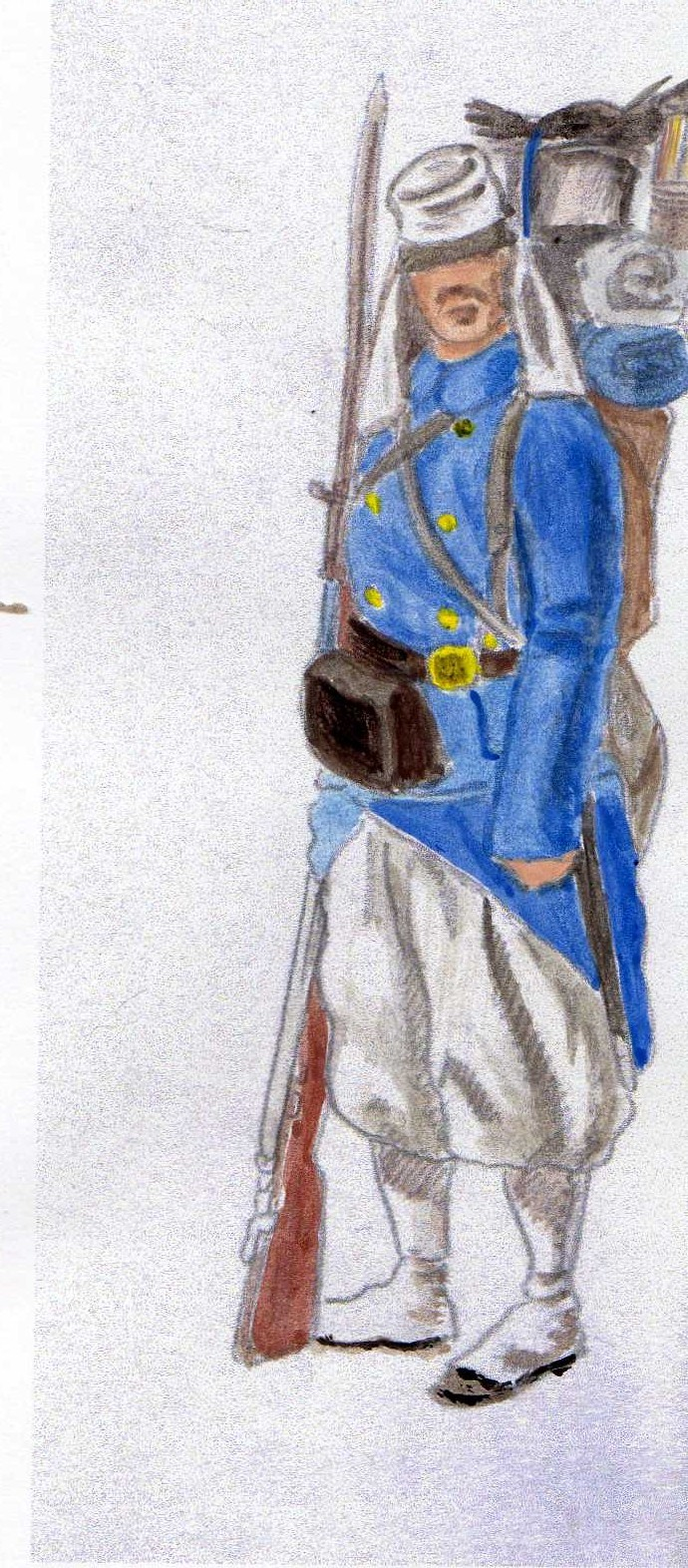
Grenadier in Mexico, 1866.

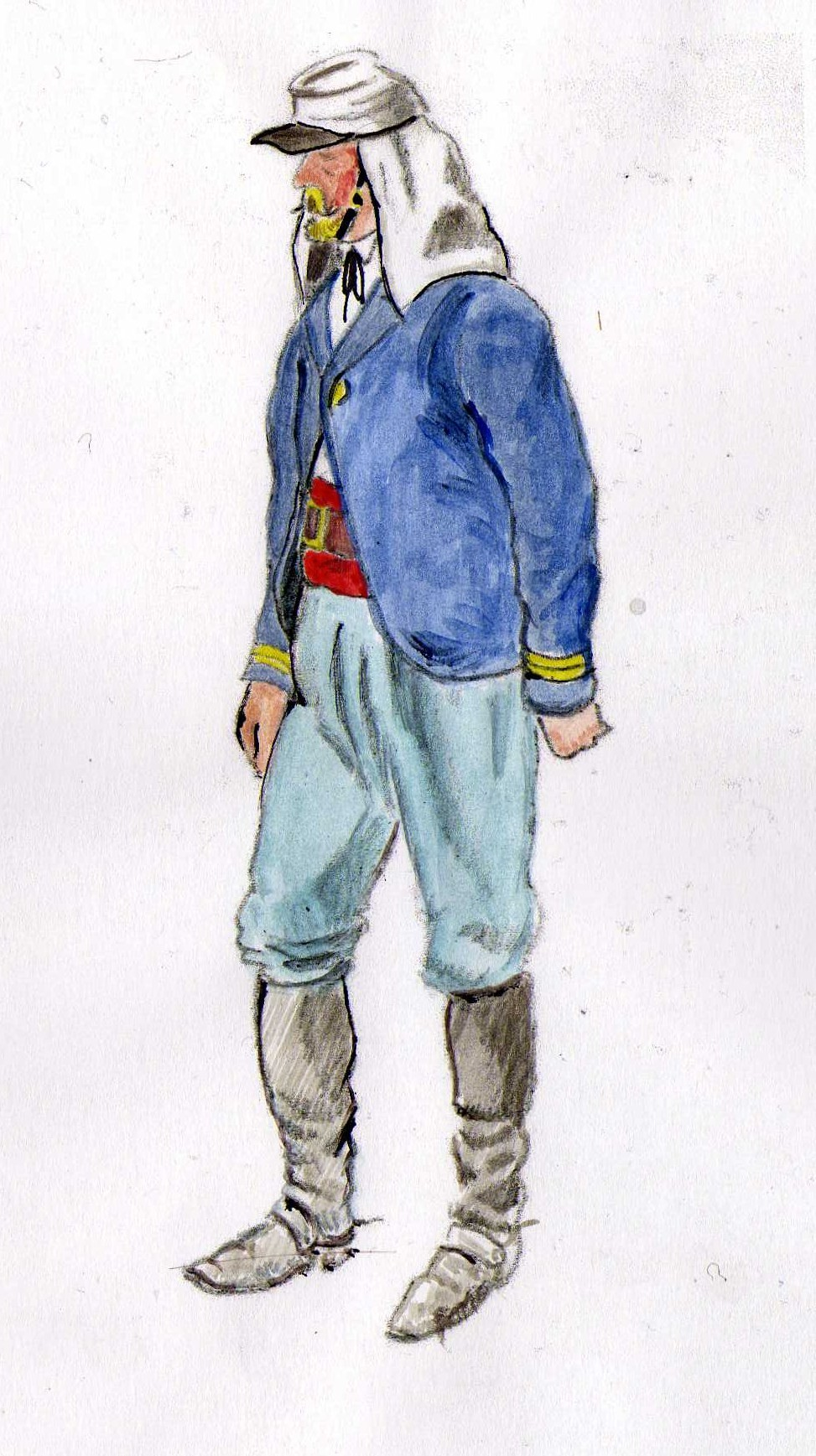
Sous-lieutenant in Mexico, 1865-7.

Several military units have been known as the Belgian Legion. The term "Belgian Legion" can refer to Belgian volunteers who served in the French Revolutionary Wars, Napoleonic Wars, Revolutions of 1848 and, more commonly, the Mexico Expedition of 1867.

== French Revolutionary era ==
The French Revolutionary armies incorporated a number of "legions" of foreign volunteers during the French Revolutionary Wars after 1792. These included a number of units recruited among exiles from the failed Brabant (1789–90) and Liège revolutions (1789–91). A number of separate units were organised, including:

- Belgian Legion (Légion belge or Légion belgique), with two battalions;
- Liégeois Legion (Légion liégeoise), with two battalions;
- Legion of Belgians and Liégeois (Légion des Belges et Liégeois), with six battalions.

These units incorporated a number of influential revolutionary figures, including Jean-Baptiste Dumonceau and Louis Lahure who both served in the Belgian Legion.

== Restoration ==
Temporarily regaining control of the Southern Netherlands, on 2 March 1814, Austria formed several military units from regional recruitment. This volunteer force was known as the Légion belge (Belgian Legion) and initially was intended to strengthen the Austrian position in their former provinces in the event of a counterattack from France. With the full occupation of the Southern Netherlands by Austria, Prussia and the United Provinces (Holland), a provisional government was established under the Duke of Beaufort and local levies continued to be recruited separately by each of the three allies. The largest of these was the Belgian Legion which, under the command of the Belgian born Austrian General Count von Murray, was now intended to keep local order. Administered by the Baron Poederlé, secretary general for armaments, this Legion was made up of 4 line infantry regiments (from Brabant, Flanders, Hainaut and Namur), a light infantry regiment, two cavalry regiments and an artillery regiment.

This unit merged into the army of the Kingdom of the Netherlands on 1 September 1814, when that nation annexed the territory that would later form Belgium.

== Liberal Wars ==
The Corps of Belgian Riflemen fought for the Portuguese Liberals in the Liberal Wars under Major Pierre-Joseph Lecharlier.

== French Revolution of 1848 ==
In March 1848, during the French Revolution of 1848, Belgian workers living in Paris formed an "Association des démocrates belges" (94, rue de Ménilmontant), led by Blervacq a wine merchant and an old officer called Fosses. This gave rise to a new Belgian Legion. Informally supported by Ledru-Rollin, Caussidière and other members of the French government dreaming of a Republican uprising in the Southern Netherlands and a subsequent French annexation of that area, this Legion's aim was to overthrow the monarchy and establish a Belgian republic. Commanded by Blervacq, Fosses and Charles Graux and escorted by students of the École Polytechnique, a troop of 1100 to 1200 unarmed men in three corps departed Paris on 25 March. Passing via Douai then Seclin (27 March), they were resupplied by the commissioner of the Nord department, Charles Delescluze, and by general Négrier.

However, France's Minister for War Cavaignac, alerted by a recent incident provoked by Belgian workers who had returned to the frontier at Quiévrain by train, demanded that Négrier give no assistance to any violation of the Belgian frontier. Négrier obeyed by ordering the Polytechniciens to turn back and closing the gates of Lille. On the evening of 28 March, however, the Legion broke camp and seized the arms and ammunition gathered by Delescluze before crossing the frontier between Neuville-en-Ferrain and Mouscron. They then confronted Belgian troops under General Joseph Fleury-Duray in Risquons-Tout (then a hamlet in the commune of Rekkem, but now part of Mouscron) and were defeated, with 7 killed, 26 wounded and 60 captured, a skirmish known as the Risquons-Tout incident. Some of the captured democrats were imprisoned in the Citadel of Huy and 17 of them condemned to death and executed at Antwerp.

== Mexico Expedition ==
During the Mexico Expedition 1,500 Belgian volunteers were formed into a Belgian Legion to fight in the army of Emperor Maximilian, whose wife, Princess Charlotte of Belgium, was Leopold I of Belgium's daughter.

=== Composition ===
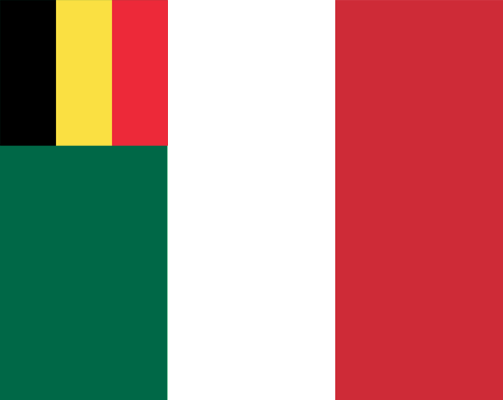
Fanion of the Belgian Legion.

Officially "The Belgian Expeditionary Corps" this Legion comprised an infantry regiment of two battalions - the "Empress Battalion" of grenadiers and the "King of the Belgians' Battalion" of voltigeurs. The officers and non-commissioned officers were mainly drawn from the regular Belgian Army as were some of the other ranks. The Belgians formed part of a much larger "Imperial Mexican Corps of Austrian and Belgian Volunteers", though they served separately from the Austrian contingent which was brigaded with Mexican Imperial troops.

=== In action ===
The first detachment of the Belgian Legion, numbering 604 men, embarked for Mexico on 16 October 1864. Three further contingents were sent over the next three months, bringing the total force up to about 1,500. The Legion's first encounter with the Mexican Republican forces was at the Battle of Tacámbaro on 11 April 1866, where a Belgian detachment of 300 men was forced to surrender after losing up to a third of its strength. The remainder of the Belgian Legion performed well in subsequent clashes but by the late summer of 1866, with the French army preparing for evacuation, morale amongst the foreign contingents attached to the Mexican Imperial army was low. Thirty Belgian officers petitioned to return to Europe on the grounds that their contracted terms of service were about to expire. Others transferred to mixed Mexican/foreign units. On 12 December 1866 the Legion was disbanded and 754 of the contingent returned to Belgium where they dispersed.

=== Aftermath ===
A small group of elderly survivors of the Belgian Legion escorted the coffin of Charlotte after her death at the Castle of Bouchout in 1927.

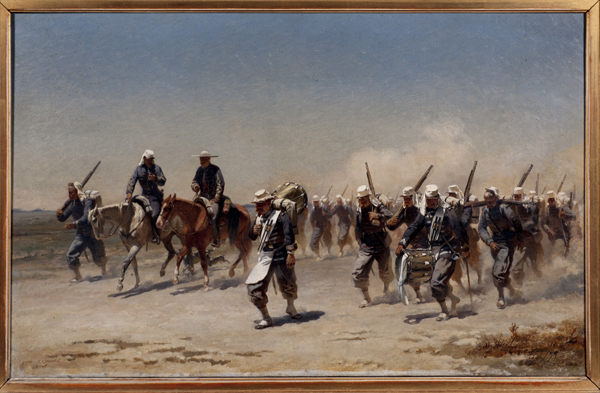
"The Belgian Legion in Mexico", painting by Charles Dominique Oscar Lahalle, 1869.

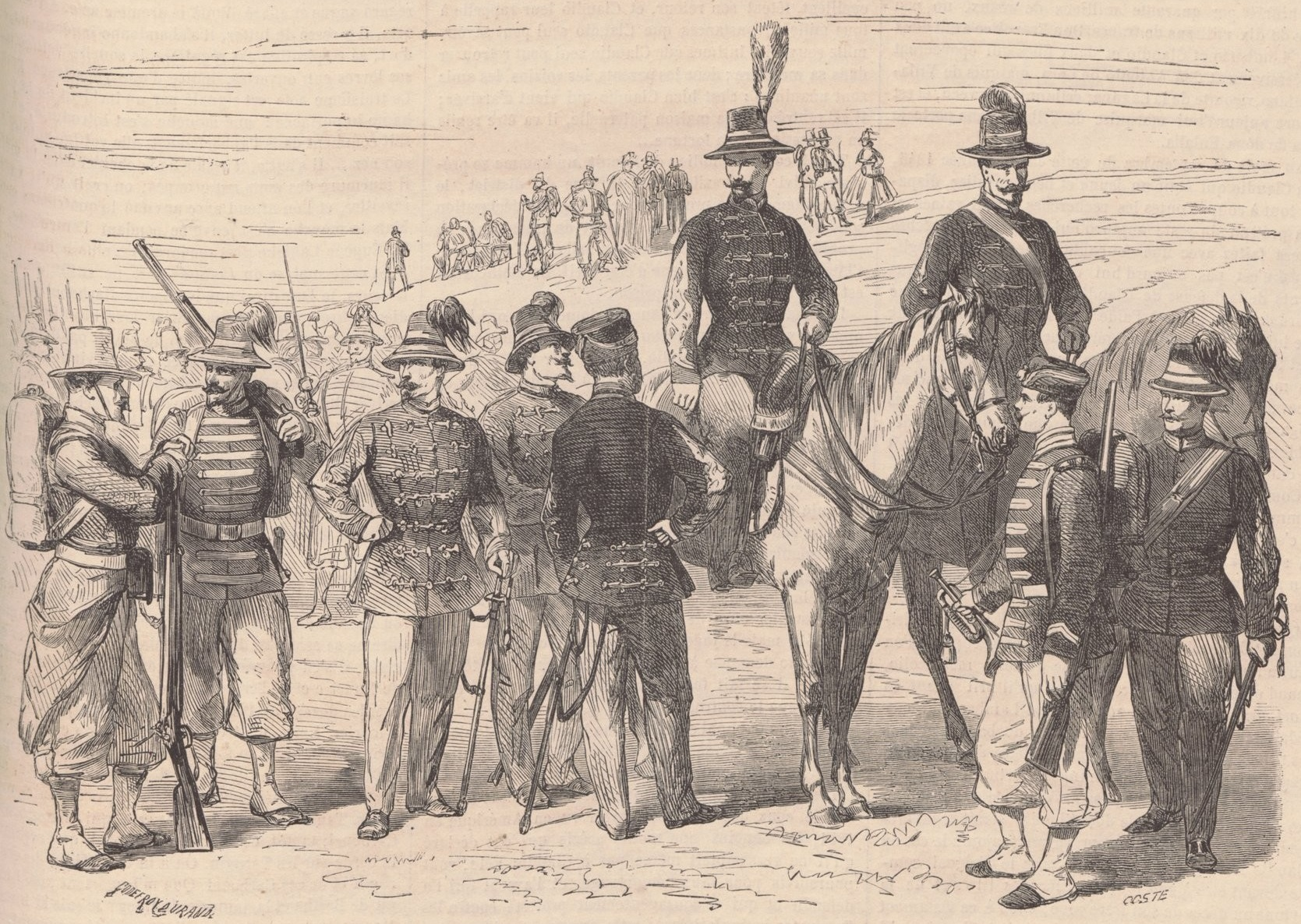
Uniforms of officers and soldiers of the Belgian regiment: bodyguards of Empress Charlotte.

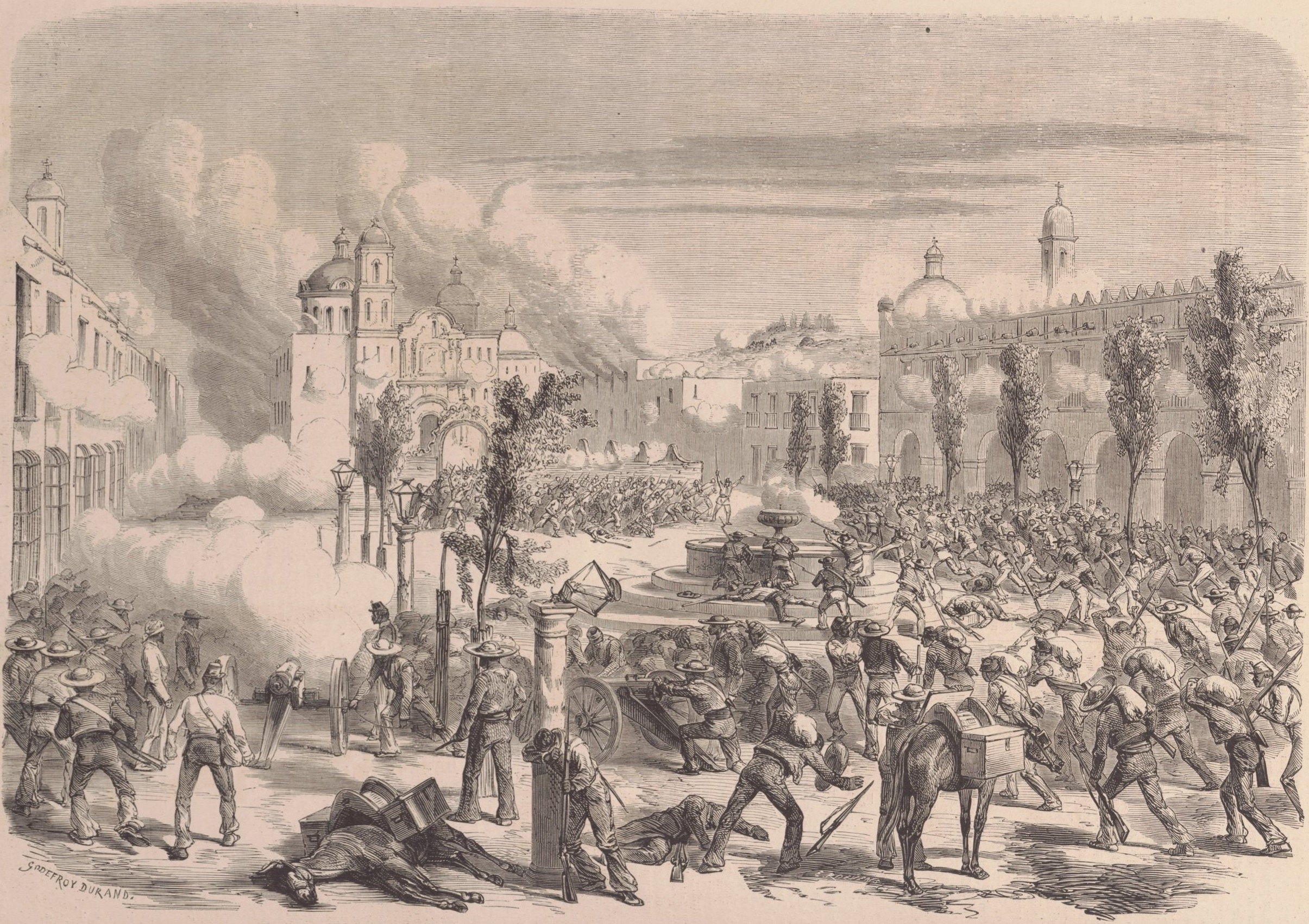
"Heroic defense of the Belgian battalion commanded by Major Tydgadt in Tacamburo, April 11, 1865." Draft by M. A. Martin representing the Battle of Tacámbaro.

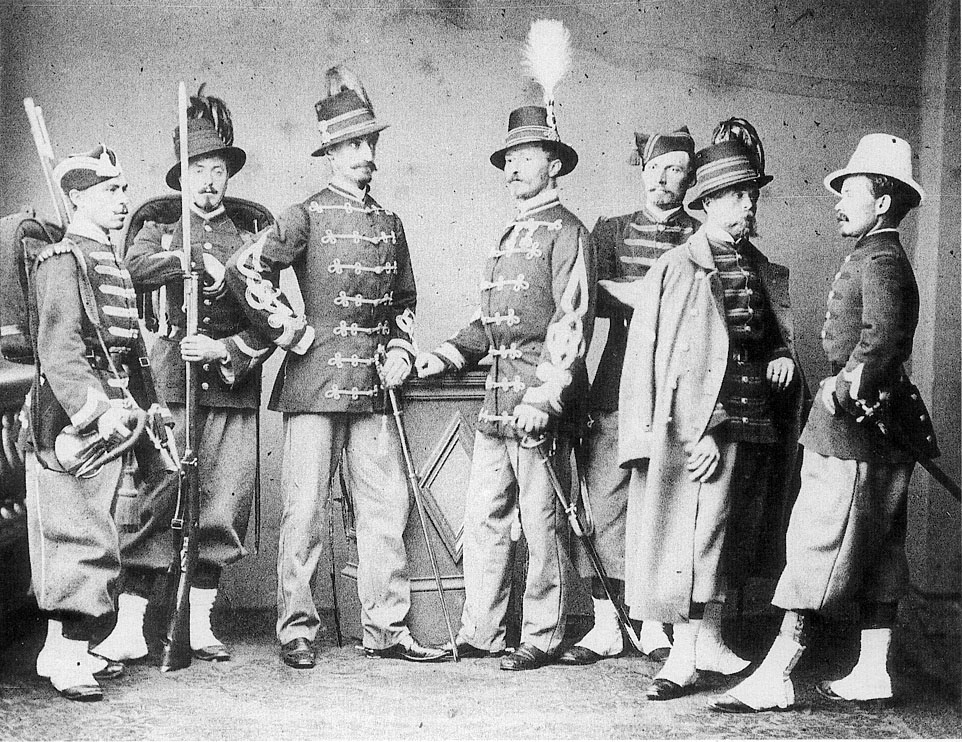
Photograph of Belgian Legion soldiers, 1866.

== See also ==
- Belgian Legion, original name of the Secret Army (Belgium), the largest organization in the Belgian Resistance to the German occupation of Belgium during World War II
- Belgian Expeditionary Corps in Russia
- Free Belgian Forces
- Belgian United Nations Command - the Belgian volunteer battalion that served in the Korean War (1950-1953)
