= I Am Legion =

I Am Legion may refer to:

== Film and TV ==
- "I Am Legion" (Justice League Unlimited), a television episode
- I Am Legion, a film by Nacho Cerdà based on the comic book series

== Music ==
- I Am Legion (album), a 2013 album by Noisia and Foreign Beggars
- I Am Legion (Witchery album), 2017

== Other uses ==
- Legion (demons), a group of demons in the New Testament
- I Am Legion (comics) (French: Je suis légion), a French comic book series

== See also ==
- Legion (disambiguation)
- My Name Is Legion (disambiguation)
