= Mickiewicz Legion =

1848 military unit in Rome

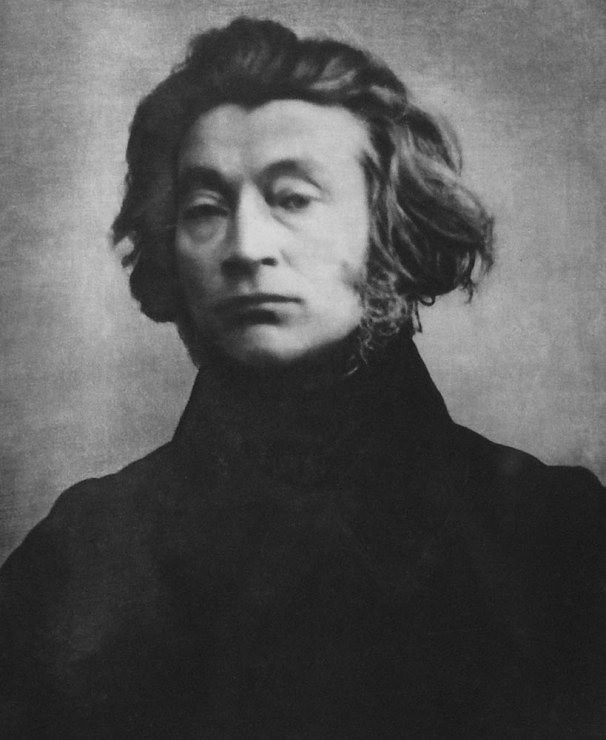
Daguerreotype of Adam Mickiewicz, 1842

The Mickiewicz Legion or the Polish Legion was a military unit formed on March 29, 1848 in Rome by one of the most notable Polish poets, Adam Mickiewicz, to take part in the liberation of Italy.

Though the Polish insurrection in the Greater Poland Uprising of 1848 failed, many Poles had not lost sight of their longstanding dream of independence. To support the continuing revolutionary movements in Western Europe, Adam Mickiewicz outreached to the Polish community in Italy to form the Polish Legion which would serve the Italian initiative until the Austrians were completely driven out of the country. Though Mickiewicz was deeply influenced by Messianism, he believed this was a time when more than just spirituality was needed: it was a time for political action. The independence of Poland, Mickiewicz believed, started in Rome. On October 5, 1847, in a meeting of the Circle of God's Work, Mickiewicz announced, "The manifestation of the Christian spirit, the construction of the state for Christ, must originate in Rome, which is both church and state. Summoned to conquer for the spirit a state on earth, we must proceed on the earth, starting from Rome, which is our support." Hence, Mickiewicz and nine other compatriots traveled to Rome, where they summoned help for their mission. Mickiewicz had hoped to receive the support of Pope Pius IX, but many people rejected his proposals: even the majority of Poles living in Italy were unfavorable to the cause. Other opposers were the clergy because of his adherence to Messianism, and the aristocracy because of his strong social ideals and the threat to their wealth and power should Poland become independent again. On March 25, 1848, Mickiewicz pleaded with Pius IX for his moral support, but after several failed attempts, Mickiewicz proceeded independently to create the constitutional program of the Polish Legion. The manifesto "Skład zasad, czyli Symbol polityczny Polski" (A collection of principles of a Political symbol of Poland) was composed by Mickiewicz for the legion and in fifteen short articles advocated freedom of conscience, equality of all citizens, equality of women, enfranchisement of peasants, solidarity and brotherhood of Slavic nations. The first struggle for the legion would be to remove Austria from Italy assisted by Slavic deserters of the Austrian Army. On May 1, Mickiewicz, now with eleven members, sent out to Milan where they were joined by a military detachment of Polish emigrants, led by Mikolaj Kaminski, to request the formation of the Polish Legion from the government of Lombardy. The agreement would make the Legion dependent on this government. Once granted, the company then appealed to expand the Polish Legion to 60 people, which the provisional government of Milan allowed as well.

Though the Legion faced financial problems and a shortage of arms, it grew to 120 members by June. Mickiewicz continued to search for volunteers in Paris while the Legion, commanded by Kaminski, engaged in several battles. They fought alongside others in Lombardy and on barricades of Genoa against the royalists, in the defence of the Roman Republic. The legionnaires also tried to help the revolutionaries in Hungary but were dispersed in Greece. However, the Mickiewicz Legion had been finally defeated in 1849. About five hundred people had served in the legion throughout its short fifteen-month existence.

== See also ==
- International Legion (Italy)
- Polish Legions (disambiguation)
- Spring of Nations
