= Mentat (computing) =

Mentat is a macro-dataflow extension of the C++ programming language. It was developed at the University of Virginia computer science Department by a research group led by Andrew Grimshaw. The combination of the ideas needed to implement the Mentat run-time with the ideas in Carnegie Mellon University's Hydra distributed operating system led to the Legion distributed OS.
