= Legion of Belgians and Liégeois =

- Légion des Belges et Liégeois
- Active: 1792
- Allegiance: French First Republic
- Size: Six battalions
- Engagements: Flanders campaign

The Legion of Belgians and Liégeois (French: Légion des Belges et Liégeois) was a military unit within the French Revolutionary army composed of volunteers from the Austrian Netherlands and Prince-Bishopric of Liège in modern-day Belgium. Its volunteers were émigrés from the failed Brabant (1789–90) and Liège revolutions (1789–91) and among the 12,000 Belgians who served in the French Revolutionary armies.

Formed in 1792, it was the third and largest of the Belgian volunteer "legions" recruited among revolutionary sympathizers. It was commanded by Charles-Joseph de Nozières d'Envezin, Count de Rosières and, at its height, numbered six battalions. Other notable formations included the Liégeois Legion (Légion liégeoise) and the Belgian Legion (Légion belgique), both of which numbered two battalions.

== See also ==
- Committee of United Belgians and Liégeois (1792–)
- Batavian Legion (1793)
