= SS Naldera =

P&O passenger liner of the 1920s and 1930s

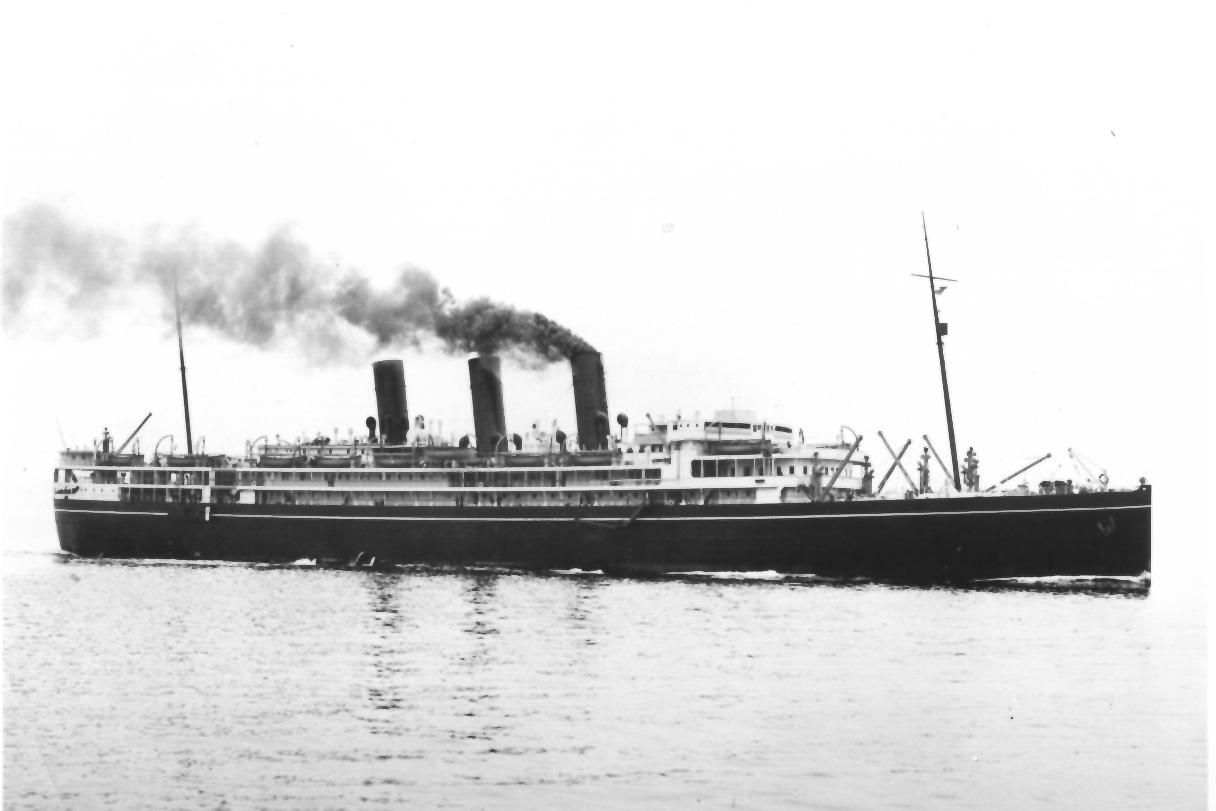
- SS Naldera c. 1924

History

United Kingdom
- Name: Naldera
- Owner: P&O
- Port of registry: Greenock
- Route: 1920–28 UK – Australia; 1928–38 UK – Singapore – Yokohama
- Builder: Caird & Company, Greenock
- Yard number: 330
- Laid down: 1913
- Launched: 29 December 1917
- Acquired: 25 March 1920
- Identification: 142257
- Fate: Broken up, 1938

General characteristics
- Type: Passenger liner
- Tonnage: 15,825 GRT; 8,794 NRT; 8,680 DWT
- Length: 580.9 ft (177.1 m)
- Beam: 67.4 ft (20.5 m)
- Depth: 44.4 ft (13.5 m)
- Installed power: 18,000 ihp (13,000 kW)
- Propulsion: 2 x quadruple-expansion steam engines
- Speed: 18 knots (33 km/h; 21 mph)
- Capacity: 673 passengers

SS Naldera was a steam-powered passenger liner owned and operated by the Peninsular and Oriental Steam Navigation Company (P&O) between 1920 and 1938.

== Construction ==
P&O placed the order to build the ship with Caird & Company, Greenock in 1913 and although work was well advanced, construction was suspended at the outbreak of the First World War in 1914 and it was not until December 1917 that the ship was launched with the intention of fitting it out as a cargo carrying vessel only. In 1918 the Admiralty requisitioned the vessel and it was fitted out with eight 6-inch (150 mm) guns and two 7.5-inch (190 mm) howitzers with the intention of being used as an armed merchant cruiser. Subsequently the Admiralty altered the plan and decided to have the ship converted to a seaplane tender but neither proposed Royal Navy use came to fruition and in 1919 the ship was returned to P&O.

Naldera was the last ship ordered by P&O from Caird's before Caird's was taken over by Harland & Wolff in 1916 and was the last coal-powered mail steamer in P&O service.

== Service history ==
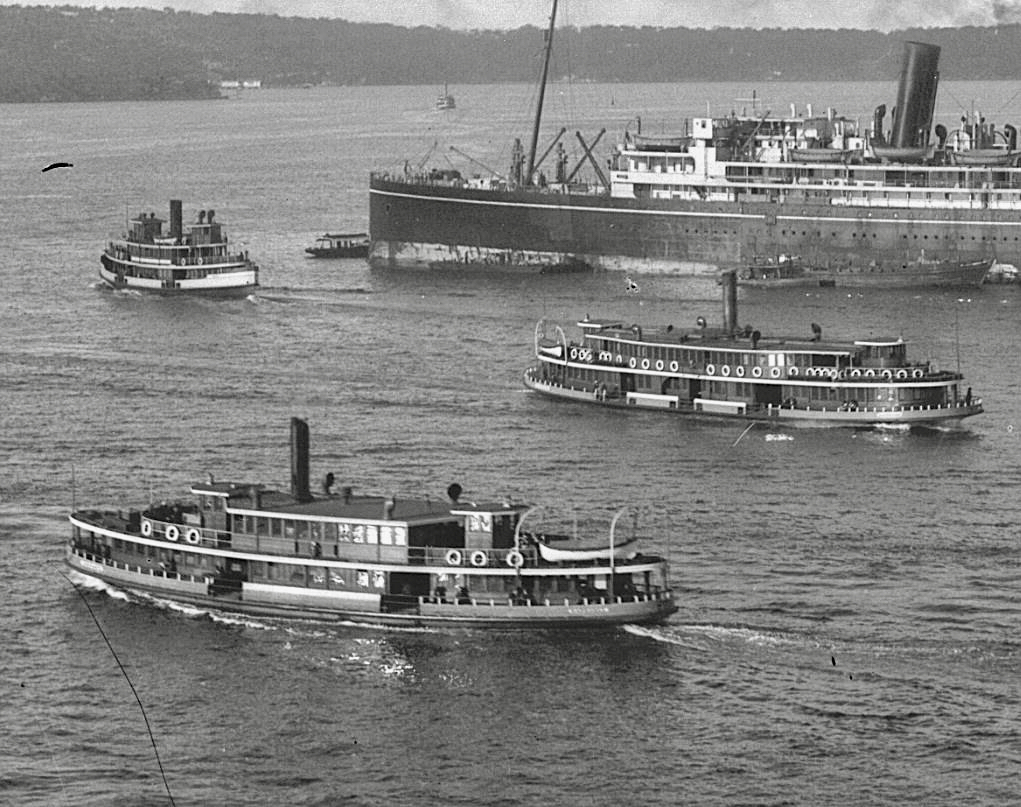
Naldera in Sydney Cove in the 1920s, moored at Bennelong Point, now the location of the Sydney Opera House.

P&O had the vessel fitted out to the original specification of mail and passenger liner and the ship entered service in April 1920 on the London – Bombay – Australia route.

On 1 May 1928 the captain of the ship, T Dayas, died suddenly shortly after the ship left Sydney, Australia and he was buried at sea. The Chief Officer, J W Hartley, taking temporary command. Among the passengers on this voyage were the Australian team en-route to Amsterdam to compete in the 1928 Summer Olympics.

In 1928 P&O transferred the ship from the London – Australia route to the London – Penang – Singapore – Hong Kong – Shanghai – Yokohama route.

After returning from Kobe, in October 1938, the vessel was paid off after a relatively short career of 18 years. The ship was immediately hired to transport the British Legion Volunteer Police Force to continental Europe to police the proposed plebiscite following the Sudeten Crisis. 700 volunteers boarded ship on 12 October 1938 and Naldera left Tilbury to anchor off Southend with another 3330 volunteers on board the MS Dunera. By 14 October changing circumstances meant that the force was no longer required so the two ships returned to Tilbury. On 15 October the volunteers disembarked and the Naldera emptied for the final time.

The following month the ship was sold for scrap to P & W MacLellan Ltd and was broken up soon after at the Forth Shipbreaking Yard, Bo'ness.

== Notable passengers ==
Apart from the Australian Olympians other passengers carried at various times included Lloyd George on his way to the San Remo conference in 1920, Arthur Conan Doyle who travelled to Australia on the ship in 1920, the Great Britain rugby league team at the start of their 1920 tour to Australia, Rabindranath Tagore who sailed from Bombay on the first leg of a journey to Canada in 1929, Sir Alan Lascelles who returned to England following his marriage Joan Thesiger in 1920 and Amy Johnson who returned from her solo flight to Australia by the ship as far as Salonika.
