= Polish Legions =

Polish Legions (Polish: Legiony Polskie) may refer to, in chronological order:

== Before World War I ==
- Polish Legions (Napoleonic era), created by Henryk Dąbrowski during the Napoleonic Wars
  - Danube Legion
  - Legion of the Vistula
- Polish Legion in Portugal, created in 1828 during Liberal Wars
- Polish Legion in Hungary, created in 1848 during Hungarian Revolution of 1848
- Mickiewicz's Legion, formed by Adam Mickiewicz in Rome in 1848
- Polish Legion in Turkey, formed under Józef Jagmin in the Russo-Turkish War (1877–1878)
- 58th New York Volunteer Infantry Regiment, a.k.a. the Polish Legion, commanded in the U.S. Civil War by Włodzimierz Krzyżanowski

== World War I and aftermath ==
- Polska Siła Zbrojna
- Blue Army (Poland)
- Polish 1st Legions Infantry Division
- Polish 2nd Legions' Infantry Regiment
- Polish 3rd Legions Infantry Division
- Polish Legion in Finland

== See also ==
- Polish Armed Forces in the East
- Polish Armed Forces in the West
- Union of Active Struggle
- Riflemen's Association
- Polish Rifle Squads
- Polish Military Organisation
- First Cadre Company
- Polish Military Organization of Upper Silesia
- Legion (disambiguation)
