= International Legion (Italy) =

Unit in Italy created by Garibaldi in 1860

The International Legion was created in Italy by Giuseppe Garibaldi, on October 5, 1860 – in the immediate aftermath of the Battle of the Volturno, where the forces of the Bourbon Kingdom of the Two Sicilies were decisively broken.

It had been the last main military engagement of the Expedition of the Thousand; however, at the time Garibaldi seriously considered going on to northwards to Rome, in order to put an end to the Temporal power of the Holy See. The International Legion was evidently to take part in this campaign, from which Garibaldi was later reluctantly dissuaded by King Victor Emmanuel II.

The International Legion brought together different national divisions of French, Poles, Swiss, German and other nationalities, with a view not just of finishing the liberation of Italy, but also of their homelands. Ludwik Mieroslawski was made head of the organization.

During Garibaldi's campaign in Sicily in 1860, he received reinforcements consisting of about 2,500 men. The largest contingent consisted of 500 Hungarians under the leadership of Colonel István Türr with Adolf Mogyórody, Nándor Éber and Gusztáv Frigyesy.

The British Legion was a British contingent, including John Whitehead Peard, Hugh Forbes, and Colonel John Dunne. Frenchmen included Lieutenant Paul de Flotte, Jean Philippe Bordone, Gustave Paul Cluseret, Maxime du Camp and Alexandre Dumas, père.

== See also ==
- International Legion (Proposed)
- Foreign legions
- French Foreign Legion
- Spanish Legion
- British Legion
- Mickiewicz's Legion
- International Legion of Territorial Defense of Ukraine
