= American Legion Memorial Park =

Park in Everett, Washington

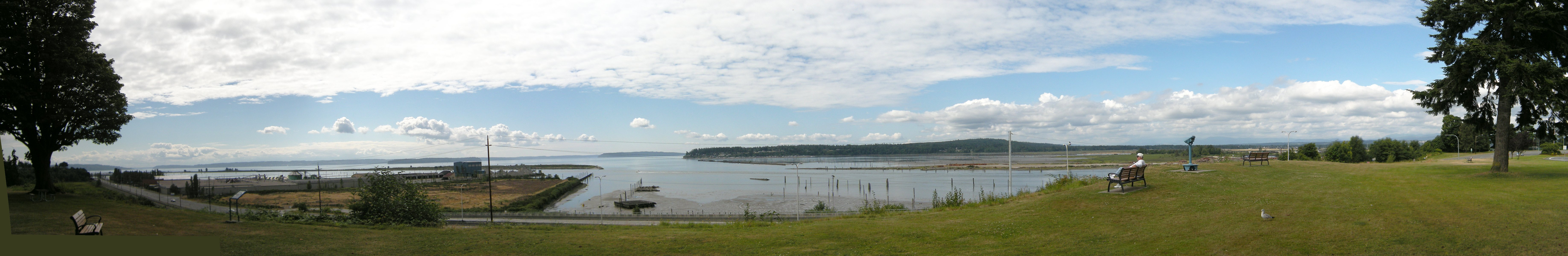
- The Hibulb Lookout at American Legion Memorial Park with a view over Port Gardner Bay

- Location within Washington (state)
- Interactive map of American Legion Memorial Park
- Type: Urban park
- Location: Everett, Snohomish County, Washington
- Coordinates: 48.0125959°N 122.2023588°W
- Area: 1.6 hectares (4.0 acres)
- Operator: Western Washington University

American Legion Memorial Park (also known as Legion Park) is a 1.6 hectares (4.0 acres) park in Everett, Snohomish County, Washington. It is located at 145 Alverson Boulevard, on the north side of Everett, overlooking Port Gardner. The park has tennis courts, baseball fields, a playground, and a picnic area.

The park's northwestern scenic viewpoint was renamed Hibulb Lookout in 2014, in honor of a former Snohomish village sited nearby.

== Evergreen Arboretum and Gardens ==
The Evergreen Arboretum and Gardens (2.4 acres (9,700 m^{2})) is an arboretum located at the west end of Legion Park. Gardens include sculpture and vistas of Possession Sound, as well as:

- Conifer garden – includes Chamaecyparis lawsoniana, Chamaecyparis nootkatensis, Pfitzeriana Aurea, Picea glauca, and Strobus 'Nana'.
- Dahlia garden – a variety of dahlias.
- Japanese Maple grove – 17 varieties of maples, with ferns and hydrangeas.
- Perennial border – includes artichoke (Cynara scolymus), Japanese forest grass (Hakonechloa macra), giant hyssop (Hyssopus officinalis), dwarf waterlily (Nymphaea), and New Zealand flax (Phormium cookianum).
- Small Urban Tree Walk
- White border – flowers and foliage in white, silver, and blue.
- Woodland garden – grotto with Knadhill and Exbury azaleas, lace-cap hydrangeas (Hydrangea macrophylla), and Pieris japonica.

The arboretum opened on April 11, 1963, with the planting of its first tree at the 3.5-acre (1.4 ha) site. It has since grown to include ten themed gardens that are maintained by donated time and funds from volunteers.

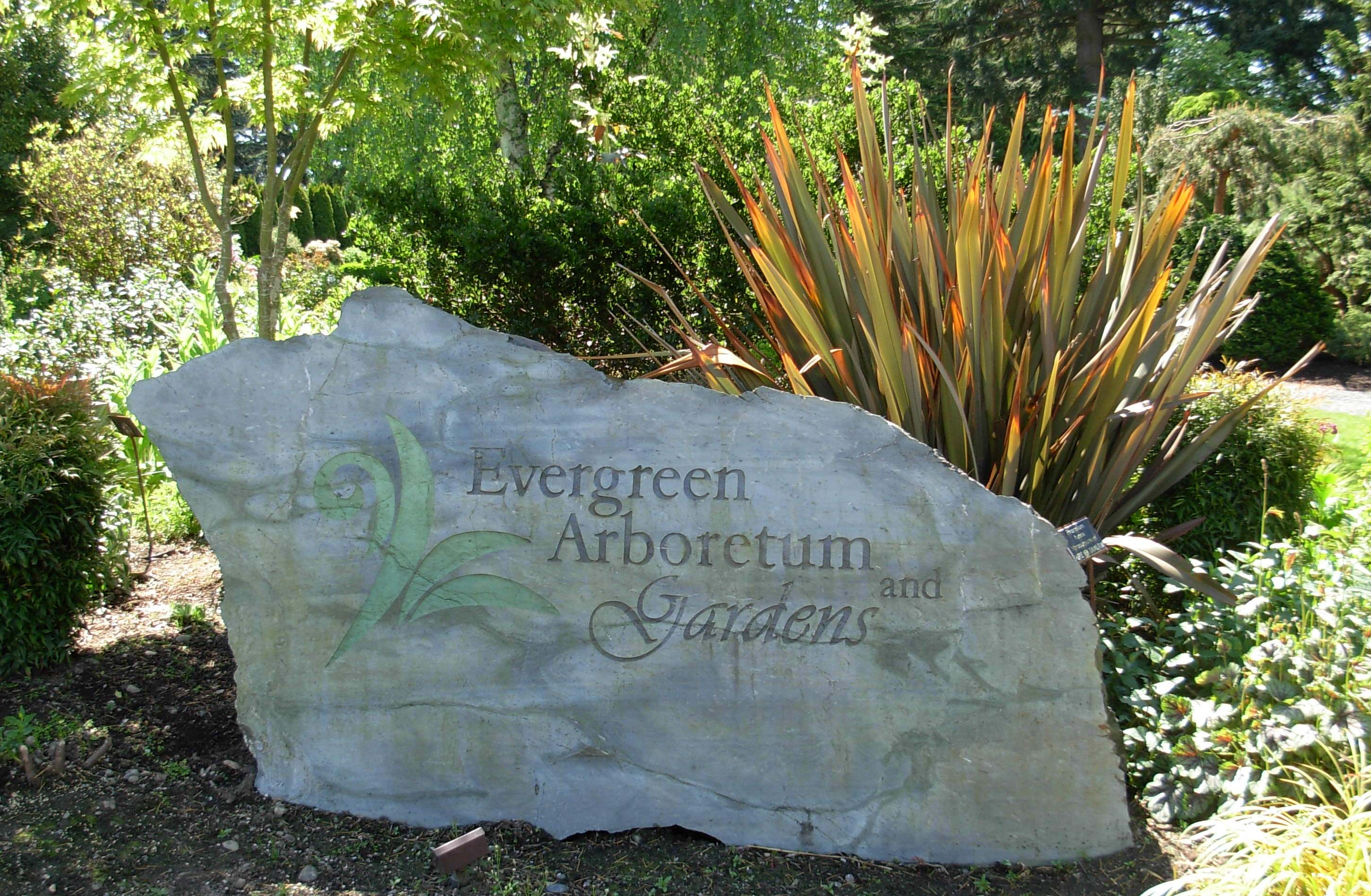

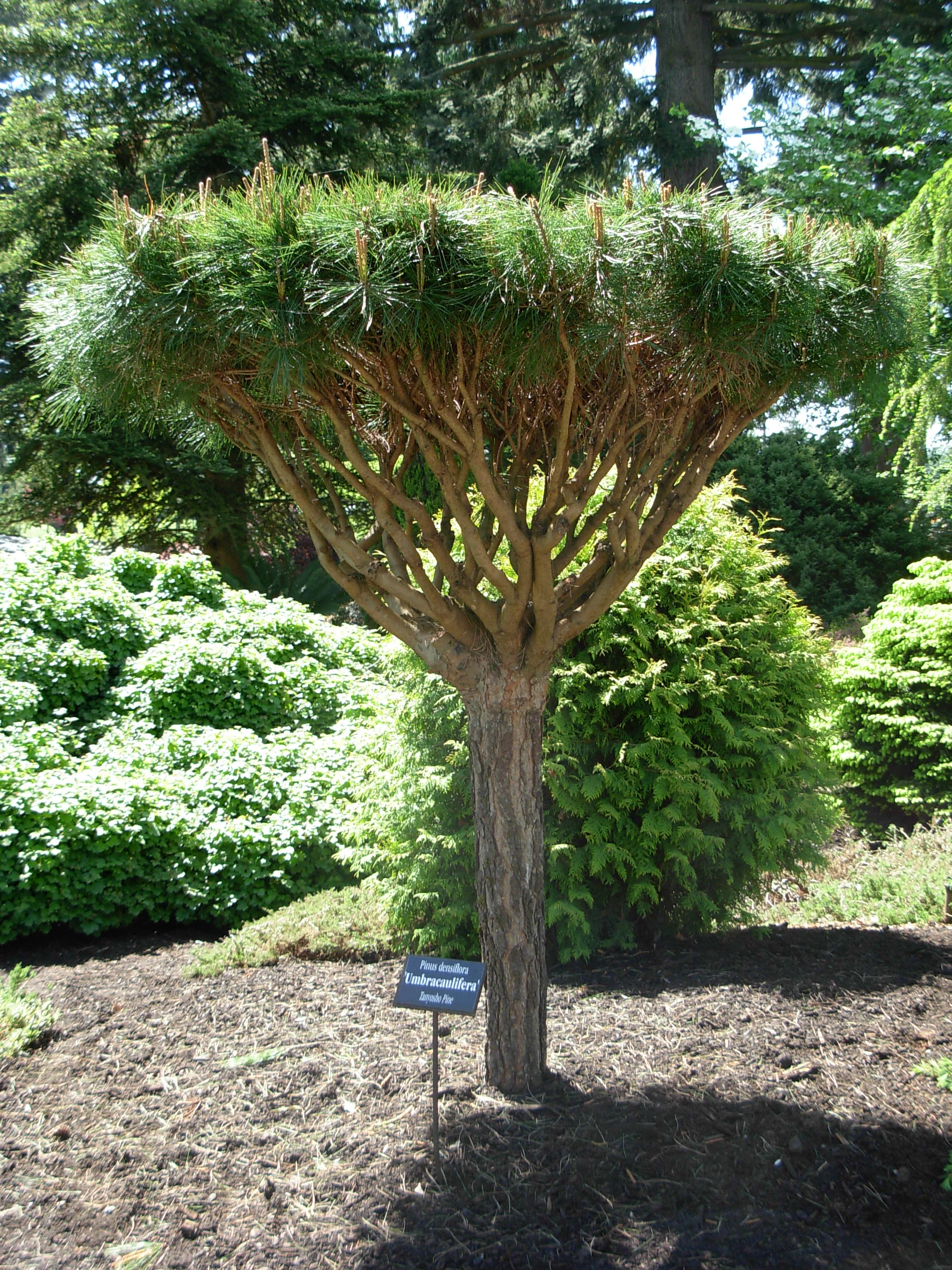

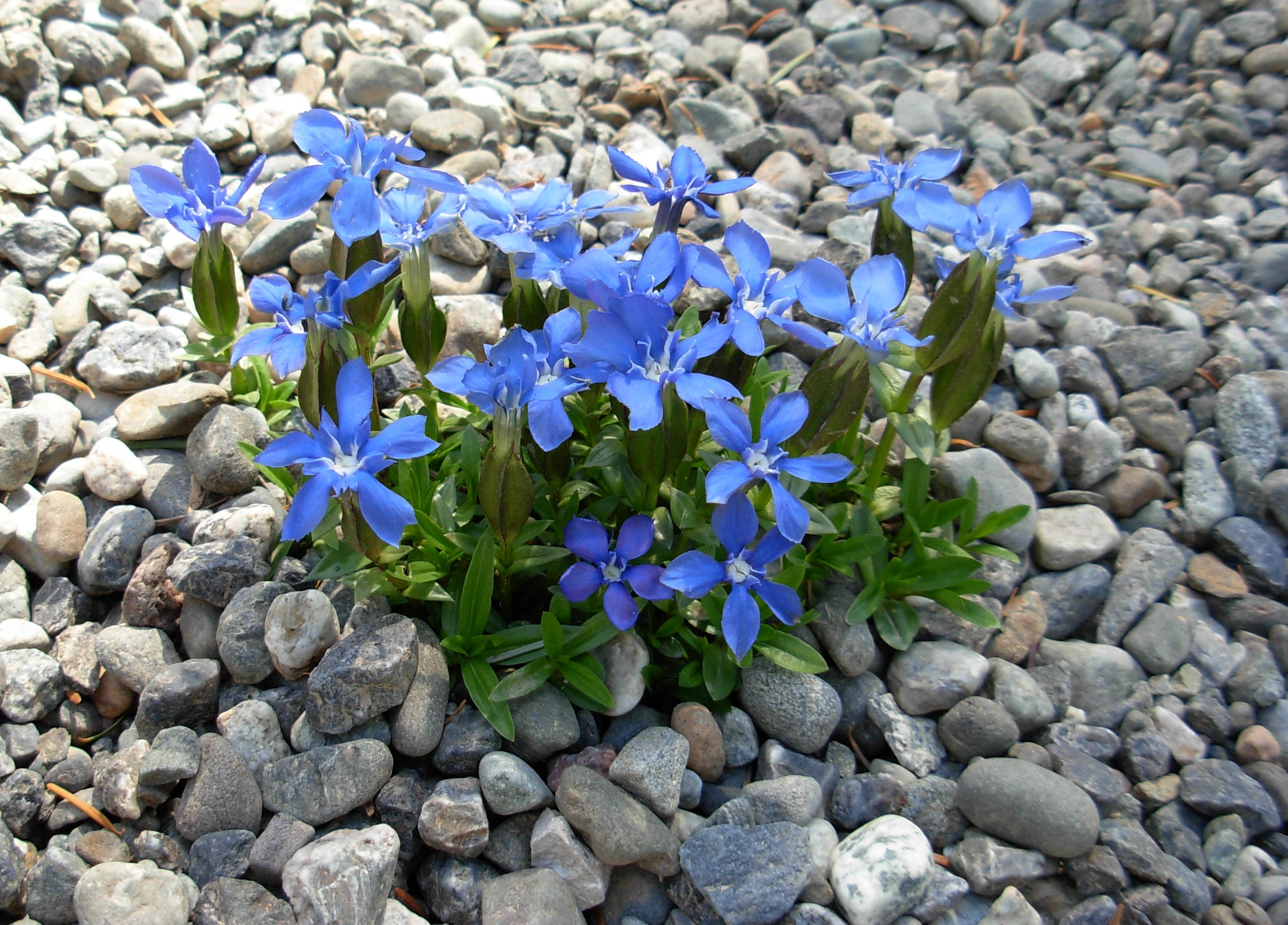

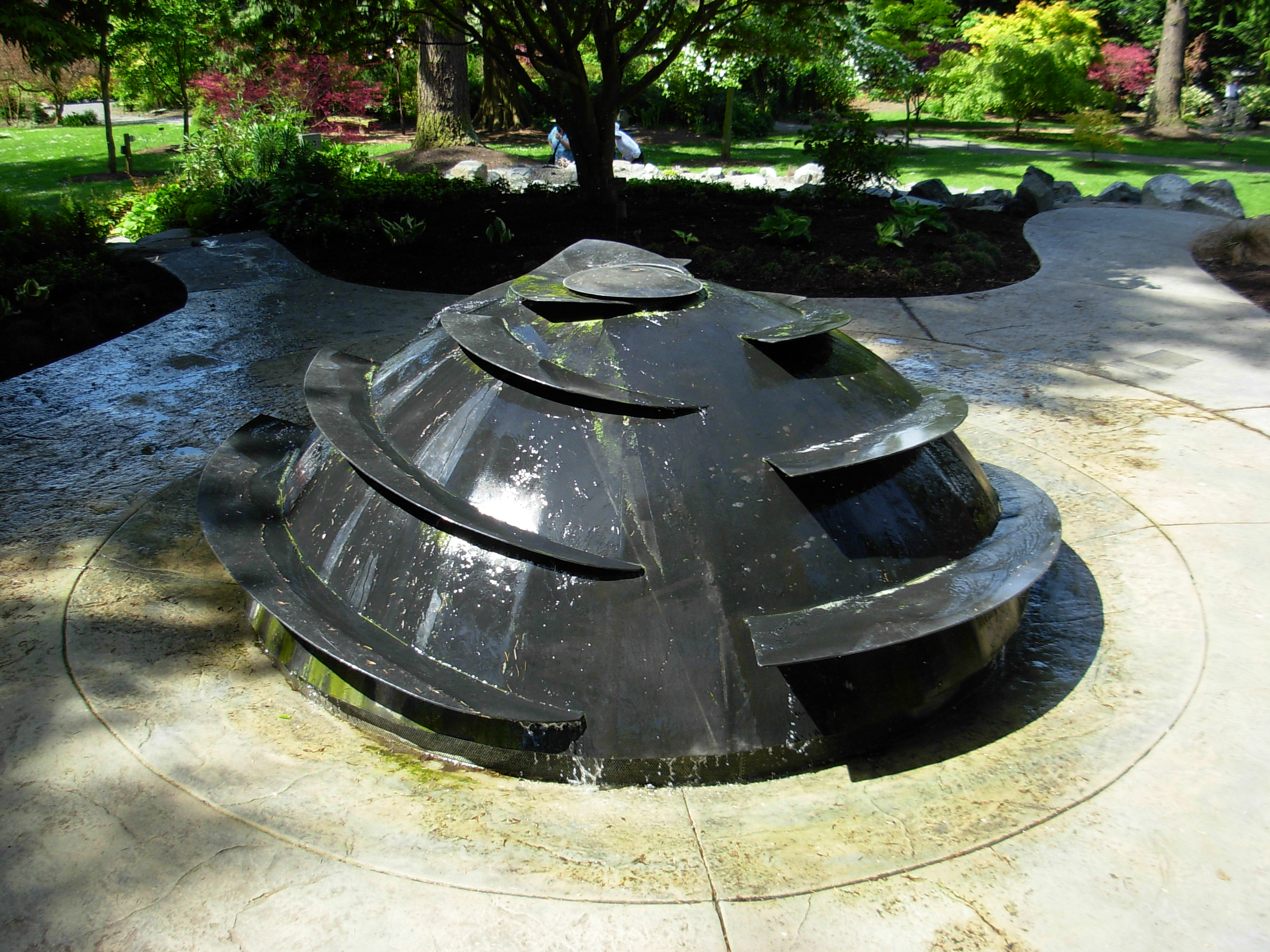

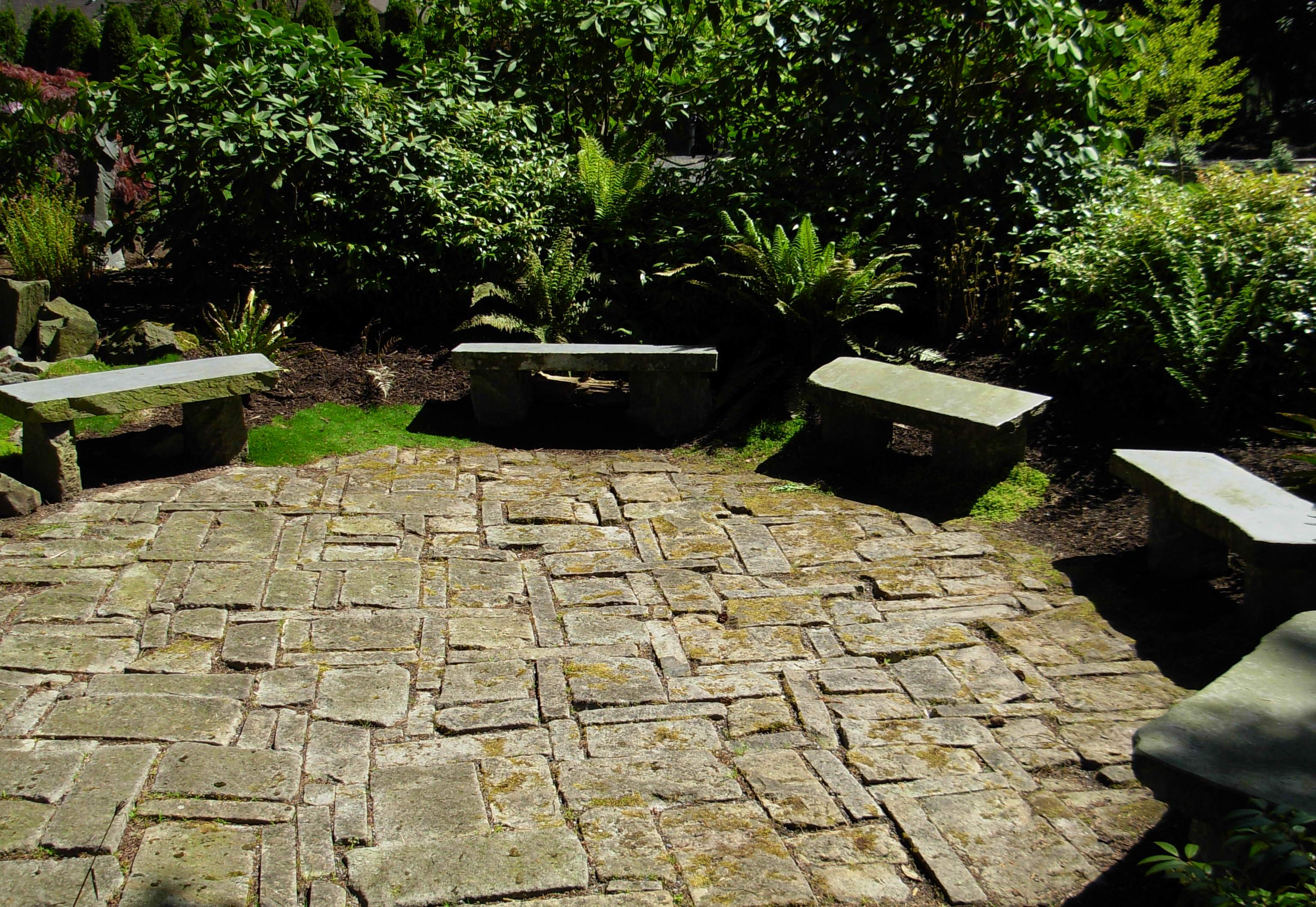
