= Värvat främlingsregemente =

Swedish army regiment

- Active: 1706–1709
- Country: Sweden
- Branch: Swedish Army
- Type: Infantry
- Size: Regiment
- Battle honours: None

Värvat Främlingsregemente (Enlisted Foreigner Regiment), was a Swedish Army infantry regiment organised in Poland in the early 18th century.

== History ==
The regiment was organised in Poland in 1706 during the Great Northern War, and it was made up of 1,200 men—mostly former Polish soldiers that had been captured or that had deserted. In 1709 when the regiment marched out of Poland, 960 men deserted, and the regiment was disbanded. The remaining soldiers were transferred to other regiments.

== Campaigns ==
- The Great Northern War (1700–1721)

== Name, designation and garrison ==
Name	Translation	From		To
Värvat främlingsregemente	Enlisted Foreigner Regiment	1706	–	1709

Designation	From		To
No designation		–	

Training ground or garrison town	From		To
No training ground		–	

== See also ==
- List of Swedish regiments
- Provinces of Sweden
