= Legion Stadium =

Legion Stadium may refer to several venues in the United States:

- American Legion Memorial Stadium, in Charlotte, North Carolina
- American Legion Stadium, in Odessa, Texas
- Hollywood Legion Stadium (1921–1959), a defunct California boxing venue
- El Monte Legion Stadium, a demolished multi-purpose indoor arena in El Monte, California
- Legion Stadium (North Carolina), in Wilmington
