= Polish Legion in Finland =

Historic military legion

- Polish: Legion Polski w Finlandii; Finnish: Puolan Legioona Suomessa
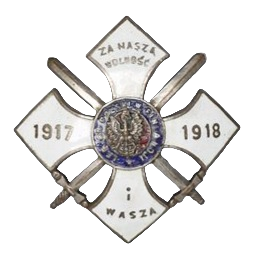
- 1922 commemorative badge for the Polish Legion in Finland, the badge reads "Za naszą wolność i waszą" (For our Freedom, and Yours)
- Active: 1917 – 1918
- Disbanded: March 1, 1918
- Country: Second Polish Republic
- Allegiance: Finnish Whites
- Branch: Polish Legions
- Size: 37 officers; 1,700 soldiers
- Garrison/HQ: Viipuri
- Engagements: Finnish Civil War

Commanders
- Notable commanders: Kapitan Stanisław Bogusławski

Polish Legion in Finland (Polish: Legion Polski w Finlandii, Finnish: Puolan Legioona Suomessa, Swedish: Polska legionen i Finland, Russian: Польский Легион в Финляндии) was a military unit made up of ethnic Poles who had been soldiers of the Russian Imperial Army during World War I and stationed in the Grand Duchy of Finland. Created on April 24, 1917 in Viipuri, the unit existed until March 1, 1918. It comprised an infantry battalion in Viipuri, an infantry company in Ino, and a heavy artillery battery in Sveaborg. At its peak, the Legion comprised 37 officers and 1,700 soldiers and was commanded by Captain Stanisław Bogusławski.

The Legion, based in Viipuri, as well as other Finnish towns, such as Helsinki, Ina, Lappeenranta, Tampere, Vaasa, Turku, Oulu, Tornio, Hämeenlinna, Kokemäki, Rauma, Panelia (Kiukainen), Riihimäki, Kotka, Mikkeli, Pori and Hanko, was subordinate to the Government of Finland, and took part in fighting against Red Army troops during the Finnish Civil War, capturing large amounts of equipment, which was handed to the Finnish Army.

After Finnish victory, Polish troops of the former Polish Legion were evacuated via Liepāja, Latvia to Poland, where they fought against the invading Soviets at Warsaw and Lwów in 1920.

In 1927, former soldiers of the Polish Legion in Finland held a 10th anniversary convention in Finland.

== See also ==
- Polnische Wehrmacht
- Blue Army
- First Cadre Company
- Polish Legions (disambiguation)
- Polish 1st Legions Infantry Division
- Polish Legions in World War I
