= Catholic Legion =

Catholic Legion may refer to:

Current Organizations:

- Legion of Mary, a group of Catholic laypeople
- Legion of Christ, a group of Catholic priests

Defunct Organizations:

- Catholic Benevolent Legion, a defunct Life Insurance provider
- Catholic Legion of Decency, a defunct activist group
