= Arthur Ducat =

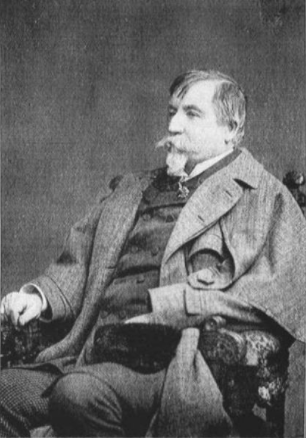
- Born: Arthur Charles Ducat; February 24, 1830; Kingstown, Ireland
- Died: January 29, 1896 (aged 65); Downers Grove, Illinois
- Resting place: Rosehill Cemetery
- Occupations: Military officer, businessman

Arthur Charles Ducat, Sr. (February 24, 1830 – January 29, 1896) was an officer in the Union Army during the American Civil War. After the Civil War, Ducat was an insurance industry executive and fire prevention specialist.

== Biography ==
Ducat was an immigrant from County Dublin, Ireland, where he was born in Kingstown on February 24, 1830. He moved to Illinois in 1851, where he was a civil engineer and an insurance agent.

Ducat began his war service on May 2, 1861, as 2nd lieutenant of the 12th Illinois Infantry Regiment. He became 1st lieutenant on May 11, 1861, captain on August 1, 1861, major on September 24, 1861, and lieutenant colonel on April 1, 1862. He was wounded at the Battle of Fort Donelson in February 1862. After his service with the 12th Illinois Infantry ended on October 30, 1862, Ducat served as the Inspector General of two major Federal armies in the western theater, mainly in the Army of the Cumberland. He was discharged on February 19, 1864.

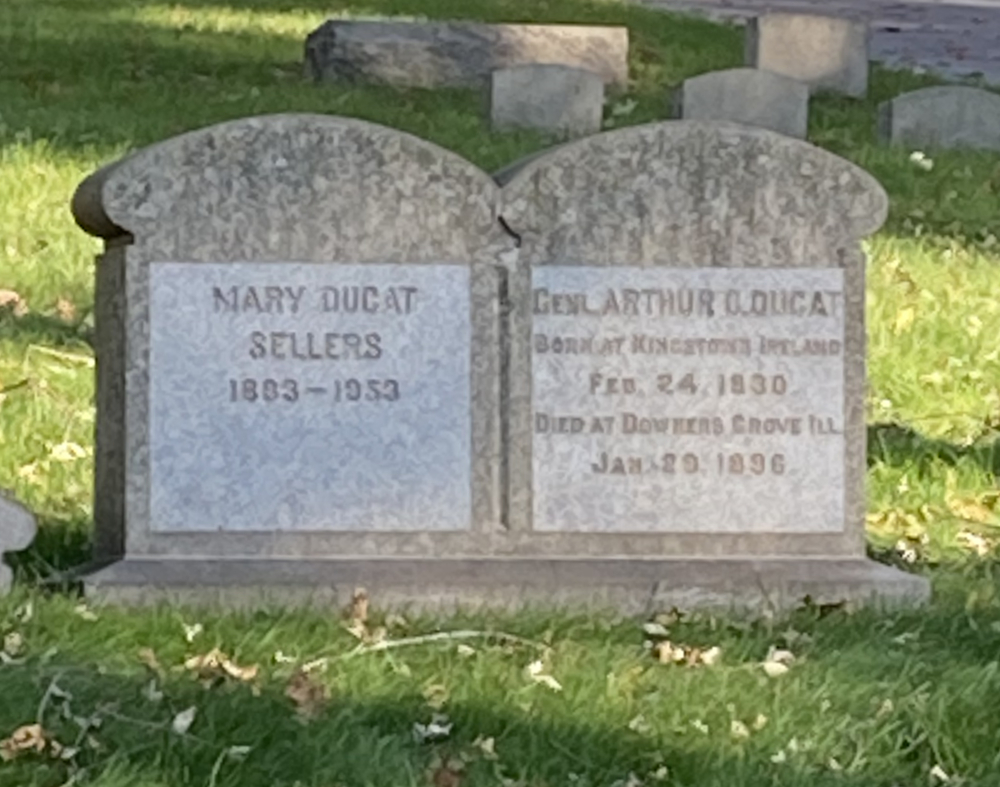
Ducat's grave at Rosehill Cemetery

On February 21, 1866, President Andrew Johnson nominated Ducat for appointment to the brevet grade of brigadier general of volunteers to rank from March 13, 1865, and the U.S. Senate confirmed the appointment on April 10, 1866.

Following the war, he was a leading executive in the insurance industry in Illinois and a world-renowned specialist. He was also an author in fire prevention, protection, who wrote one of the standard reference works on the topic: The Practice of Fire Underwriting. In 1873, Ducat wrote the military code for the Illinois National Guard and became its commander with the grade of major general.

Ducat died January 29, 1896, at Downers Grove, Illinois, and was buried in Rosehill Cemetery, Chicago, Illinois.
