= Legion =

Legion may refer to:

== Military ==
- Roman legion, the basic military unit of the ancient Roman army
- Aviazione Legionaria, Italian air force during the Spanish Civil War
- A legion, the regional unit of the Italian carabinieri
- Spanish Legion, an elite military unit within the Spanish Army
- Condor Legion, a unit of military personnel from the air force and army of Nazi Germany
- French Foreign Legion, a part of the French Army, created for foreign nationals willing to serve in the French Armed Forces
- International Legion (Ukraine), a Ukrainian foreign volunteer wing of the 2022 Russo-Ukrainian war
- HMS Legion (1914), a Royal Navy World War I destroyer
- HMS Legion (G74), a Royal Navy World War II destroyer sunk in 1942
- Legion of the United States, a reorganization of the US Army from 1792 to 1796
- Various military legions, often composed of soldiers from a specific ethnic, national, religious or ideological background

== Veterans' organizations ==
- American Legion, an organization of American veterans
- Royal British Legion, a UK charity providing support for members of the British Armed Forces and their dependents
- Royal Canadian Legion, a non-profit Canadian veterans' organization
- South African Legion of Military Veterans, the oldest veterans organization organisation in South Africa
- Society of the Cavaliers of the Order of Lāčplēsis & Freedom Fighters, also known as the Legion, a right-wing veterans' organisation founded by Voldemārs Ozols (1884–1949)

== Arts and media ==
=== Comics ===
- Legion (Marvel Comics), an antihero
- Legion (DC Comics), a supervillain
- Legion of Super-Heroes, a DC Comics superhero team
- The Legion (comics), one of the comic books where the Legion of Super-Heroes was published
- Legion, a group of characters from the Spawn series
- Legion, a member of the Special Executive
- L.E.G.I.O.N., a 1989 DC Comics title and a team of superheroes, the 20th century forerunners to the Legion of Superheroes
- Ghostbusters: Legion, a 2004 comic book series

=== Film and television ===
- "Legion" (Law & Order: Criminal Intent), the eighteenth episode in the second season of Law & Order: Criminal Intent
- "Legion" (Red Dwarf), the second episode of Red Dwarf Series VI
- Legion (1998 film), a 1998 made-for-television film
- Legion (2010 film), a 2010 horror action film
- The Legion (film), 2020, starring Mickey Rourke
- Legions (film), a 2022 Argentine supernatural horror film
- Legion (TV series), an FX TV series based on the Marvel Comics character
- "Legion", an eighth-season episode of the television series Smallville
- Legion, an alien kaiju seen in the film Gamera 2: Attack of Legion
- Legion, a fictional computer network in the 2019 film Terminator: Dark Fate

=== Games ===
- Legion Gold, or simply Legion, a strategy game
- Legions (Magic: The Gathering), a set of cards in the game Magic: The Gathering
- Legion (Mass Effect), the adopted name of a synthetic intelligence in Mass Effect 2
- Legion, central villain of the video game Shadow Man
- Legion, an artificial intelligence unit in Command & Conquer 3: Kane's Wrath
- World of Warcraft: Legion, the sixth World of Warcraft expansion set
- The Legion, a group of killer characters in the horror video game Dead by Daylight
- Watch Dogs: Legion, an action-adventure game and the third installment in the Watch Dogs series
- Caesar's Legion, a faction in Fallout: New Vegas

=== Plays ===
- Legion, by Hal Corley

=== Literature ===
- Legion (novella series), a series of novellas by Brandon Sanderson
- Legion, a unit in the army of the fictional The Domination
- Legion (Blatty novel), 1983, by William Peter Blatty
- Legion (demons), a group of demons referred to in the Christian Bible
- Legion, by Dan Abnett, book 7 in the Horus Heresy book series
- The Legion (novel), a 2010 historical novel by Simon Scarrow

=== Music ===
- Legion Records, started in 1997 by Michael Brosnan under the name Goatboy Records
- Legion (band), a deathcore band from Columbus, Ohio
- Erik Hagstedt, Swedish vocalist in the black metal band Marduk (stage name "Legion")
- The Legion, a hip hop group from the Bronx, New York, associated with Black Sheep
- Legion (Deicide album), 1992
- Legion (Creepy Nuts album), 2025
- Legion, a 1985 album by Mark Shreeve
- Legions, a 2013 album by the Danish band Artillery
- "Legion", a song by Blue Stahli from Obsidian
- "Legion", a song by Candiria from Kiss the Lie
- "Legion", a song by HammerFall from No Sacrifice, No Victory
- "Legion", a song by Junkie XL from Big Sounds of the Drags
- "Legion", a song by Saviour Machine from Saviour Machine I
- "Legion", a song by Slaughter Lord, covered by At the Gates in the 2002 re-issue of the album Slaughter of the Soul
- "Legion", a song by Tesseract from War of Being
- "Legion", a song by VNV Nation from Empires
- "Legion", a song by 2slimey from the album "More Anxiety"
- "Legions", a song by August Burns Red from Season of Surrender
- "Legions", a song by Winds of Plague from Decimate the Weak

== Sports ==
- Legion Field, a stadium in Birmingham, Alabama
- Legion Sports Complex, a complex in Wilmington, North Carolina
- Legion Stadium (disambiguation)
- Racine Legion, an American football team from 1922 to 1925

== Other uses ==
- Legion (demons), the collective name of the demons in the gospel account of the Gerasene demoniac
- Legion (taxonomy), a taxonomic rank in biology
- Legion (software), a computer software system
- Legion Interactive, an Australian telecommunications company
- Legion of the Archangel Michael, a political and militant movement in Romania

== See also ==
- Legion Park (disambiguation)
- Catholic Legion (disambiguation)
- Legionnaire (disambiguation)
- Legionary
- Lenovo Legion, a series of high-end gaming laptops
