= Batavian Legion =

The Batavian Legion (légion batave or légion franche étrangère batave) was a unit of Dutch volunteers under French command, created and dissolved in 1793.

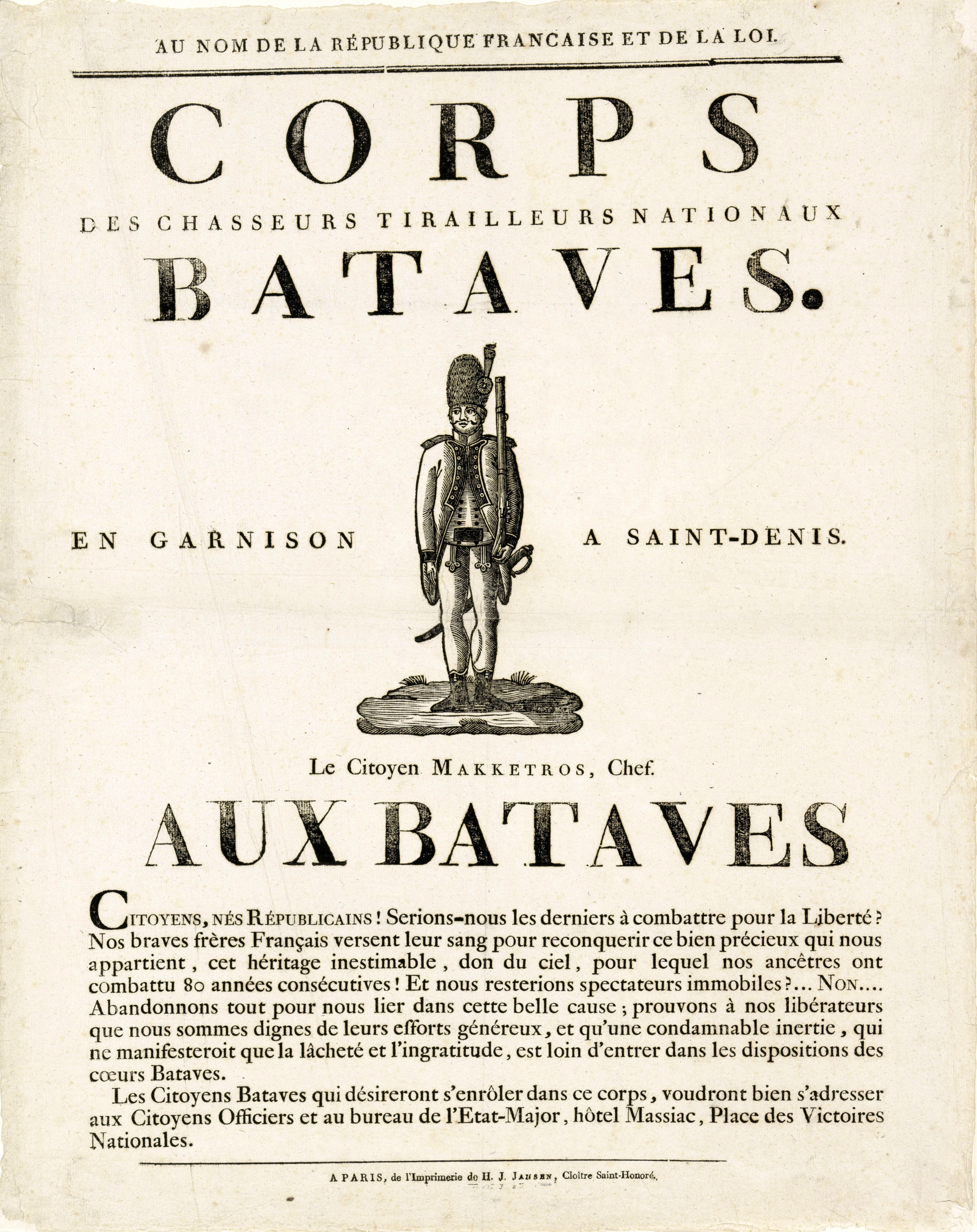
Appeal to Dutch refugees to join Batavian Legion

== History ==
The project to regroup the supporters of the Patriot Revolt in exile in France at the end of the 1780s was born in December 1791. The Patriots' initial idea was to form the embryo of a Dutch national army, on the French model, so as to set up and support a Batavian republic and replace the Dutch Republic's pseudo-monarchy under stadtholder William V of Orange-Nassau. However, France was not yet at war with the Dutch Republic and the French government rejected the idea of a Batavian legion. A second petition to the Legislative Assembly in May 1792, at the time the Belgian Legion (1792) was forming, did not meet with success.

In July 1792 Quint Ondaatje sought help from Johan Valckenaer and Court Lambertus of Beyma and proposed the formation of a Batavian Legion, assisting in an invasion into the Dutch Republic by general Dumouriez.

It took until 1 February 1793 and the Dutch Republic's entry into the war against France for the Batavian Legion to get off the ground. The minister for war, Dumouriez, advanced 700,000 livres for its formation and it gathered in the Dunkirk region under the command of lieutenant-colonel Herman Daendels. It then fought in Belgium alongside the French army and the Belgian Legions.

On 17 February 1793, the French troops and the Batavian Legion crossed the border; Ondaatje was present during the Siege of Breda by Westermann, occupied by an army of Sans-Culottes that lacked almost everything. The Armée du Nord was ordered to return to Brussels rather than further entering Holland.

It was dissolved after its defeat at Neerwinden in October 1793 and its members merged into French units. Although it had been unable to fight in the conquest of the Dutch Republic and the institution of the Batavian Republic in 1795, a number of its members formed the ranks of that new regime's army.
