= 237th Battalion (American Legion), CEF =

The 237th Battalion, CEF was a unit in the Canadian Expeditionary Force during the First World War. Based in Sussex, New Brunswick, the unit began recruiting in the Spring of 1916 in Military Districts 4, 5, 6, and 7 and was one of several "American" battalions in the CEF. The unit was disbanded while still in Canada and its men transferred to the 97th Battalion, CEF. The 237th Battalion, CEF had one Officer Commanding: Lieut-Col. C. S. Bullock.

== See also ==
- 97th Battalion (American Legion), CEF
- 211th Battalion (American Legion), CEF
- 212th Battalion (American Legion), CEF
- 218th (Edmonton) Battalion, CEF
