= British Legion Volunteer Police Force =

The British Legion Volunteer Police Force was a very short lived police force established in response to the outcome of the Munich Agreement in September 1938. The force was formed on 6 October 1938 and disbanded on 15 October 1938, only ten days later.

== Origins ==
During the Sudeten Crisis of 1938 when the threat of war in Europe was rising, the President of The Royal British Legion, Sir Frederick Maurice volunteered the services of the members of the British Legion to the British Government "in the event of a national emergency arising ... in such way as its activities could be most usefully employed." The offer was acknowledged by the Prime Minister, Neville Chamberlain who expressed his "earnest hope that such an emergency will not arise". On 25 September Germany was demanding the secession of the Sudetenland by 1 October but agreed to a plebiscite being held to determine the frontier. As part of the German demand was that Czech troops were withdrawn there was a need for the region to be policed and Chamberlain proposed that this was a role that could be fulfilled by the British Legion. This was an offer that Germany acceded to. Accordingly, Maurice visited Berlin to discuss arrangements, and the result was a call for volunteers to act as a police force in the plebiscite areas. On 4 October it was reported that 1,200 volunteers (1000 operational and 200 support staff) had been selected and would travel to the Sudetenland, over 10,000 having volunteered. A communiqué issued by the Foreign Office "The British Legion recently offered to place its entire organization at the disposal of his Majesty's Government for any service that might be required in connexion with the settlement to be arrived at in Czechoslovakia. His Majesty's Government, in accepting that offer, have decided to ask the Legion to make itself responsible for providing a force of 1,000 volunteer police, for special duties in the plebiscite areas." This was the first mention of calling this body of men a police force.

The force mustered at Olympia in London on 7 October, were sworn in as special constables on 8 October, and entrained to Tilbury on 12 October where they boarded the recently retired P&O liner SS Naldera and the troopship HMT Dunera to sail to Bremen. On 13 October, before either ship sailed, the International Commission meeting in Berlin decided that no plebiscite was needed and therefore the force was redundant. As a result, the force disbanded on 15 October and the men returned to their homes.

Only three members of the force ever travelled to Czechoslovakia when an advance party flew via Brussels to investigate billeting arrangements in the Sudetenland.

== Organisation, leadership and equipment ==
Commander of the force was the Legion's national chairman Major Sir Francis Fetherston-Godley. His subordinate commanders were Lieutenant-General Sir James O'Dowda, Brigadier-General E.R. Fitzpatrick and Colonel W. Wilberforce. The force even had its own chaplain, a role filled by the Bishop of Truro, Joseph Hunkin.

The force was unarmed with each man carrying only a walking stick and a police whistle. Each was given a double breasted blue suit, a police overcoat, peaked cap of the type issued to special constables, boots and leggings. To identify them each man was to wear the British Legion badge, the Legion tie and an arm brassard embossed British Legion. On disbandment the cap and overcoat had to be returned but each man was entitled to retain the rest of the equipment.

Regardless of his role within the force each man was paid the same rate of £3 15s per week for married men and £3 per week for single men.

The force was organised into a Headquarters and two divisions "easily sub-divisible into self-contained units".

== Aftermath ==
Although the force was never used, the leadership of the British Legion saw the episode as a publicity triumph and being responsible for raising the prestige of the Legion. In his chairman's address to the 1939 Legion conference, Fetherston-Godley, stated

The whole press, with one exception, supported the formation of the Force, and they had got an advertisement for the Legion which could not be bought for £100,000. That was all he need say about a Force with a very long name and a very short life.
