= International Legion (proposed) =

United Nations military proposal

An International Legion has been proposed by several sources to give the United Nations a standing military force based around or along the lines of the French Foreign Legion. One proposal in which this organization would be based around the French Foreign Legion was by Edward Luttwak, Director of Geo-Economics at the Center for Strategic and International Studies.

Earlier views on the same volunteer intervention force have included Christopher Bellamy's 1996 book Knights in White Armour, which suggested a "UN Legion" as well as a "Single European Regiment".
