= Legion (software) =

Legion is a computer software system variously classified as a distributed operating system, a peer-to-peer system, metacomputing software, and middleware. It is an object-based system designed to provide secure, transparent access to large numbers of machines, both to computational power and data.

The project was funded by the National Science Foundation and other funding agencies, and was mostly developed at the University of Virginia by a group led by Andrew Grimshaw. The Legion people formed the Avaki Corporation to commercialize the project in 1999, but Avaki eventually abandoned the Legion software base, and finally went bankrupt in 2005, with its intellectual property acquired by Sybase.

Legion is the successor to Hydra, developed to run on the C.mmp hardware system developed at Carnegie Mellon University in the late 1960s.

One of the slogans of the Legion project is "mechanism, not policy!"
