= Belgian Legion (1792) =

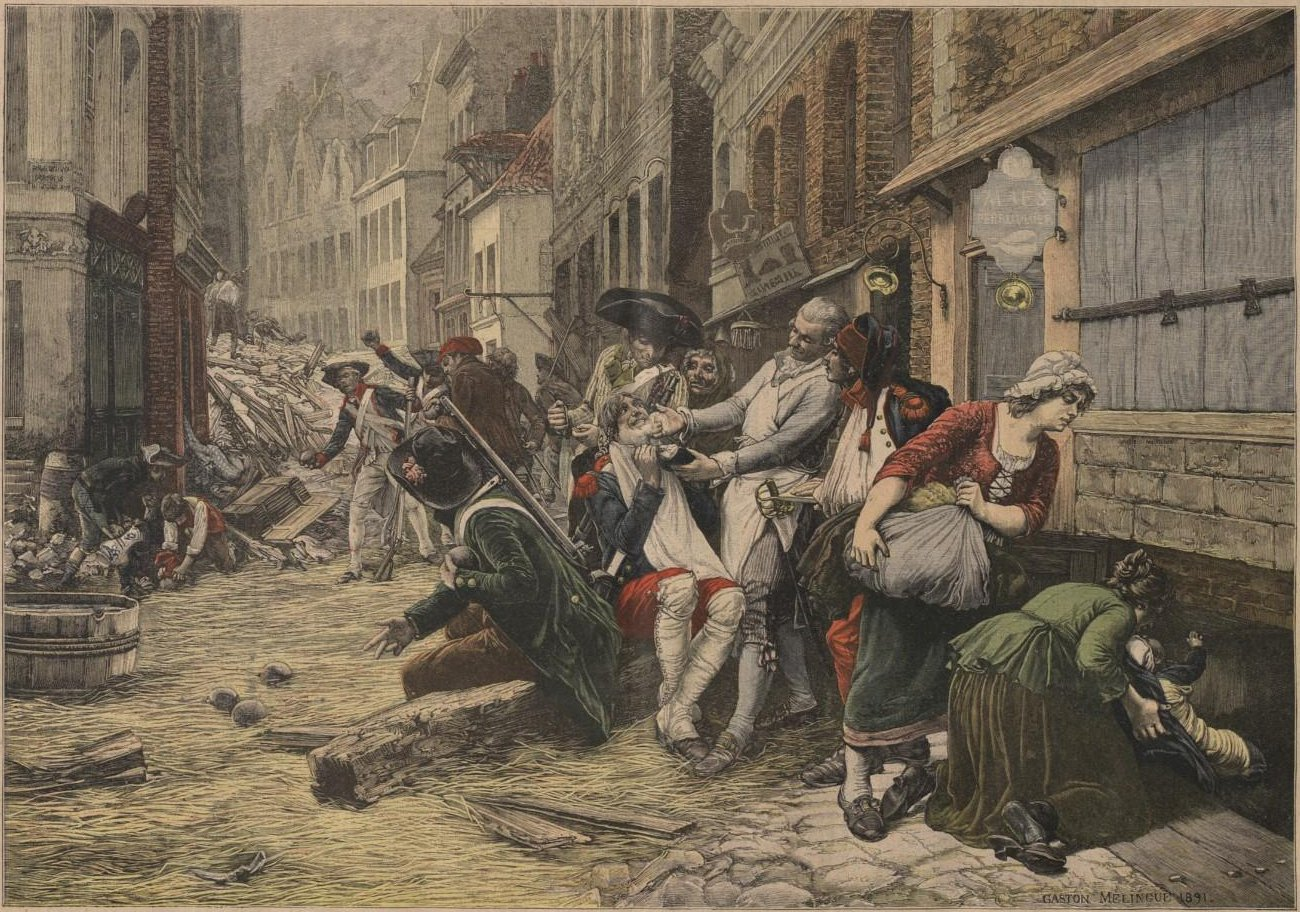
Depiction of the Siege of Lille in 1792 in which a unit of the Belgian Legion participated

The Belgian Legion (French: Légion belge or Légion belgique (Note: At the time belgique(s) was widely used in French as an adjective ("Belgian"), rather than the more modern belge(s). It has subsequently become a noun.)) was a military unit within the French Revolutionary army composed of volunteers from the Austrian Netherlands in modern-day Belgium. Its volunteers, predominantly Vonckists, were émigrés from the failed Brabant Revolution (1789–90) and among the 12,000 Belgians who served in the French Revolutionary armies. It was one of a number of separate Belgian "legions", the most important of which were the Belgian Legion, the Liégeois Legion, and the Legion of Belgians and Liégeois.

Formed in 1792, the Belgian Legion was initially commanded by Colonel Jacques Leunckens who had previously served during the Brabant Revolution as an aide to General Jean-André van der Mersch. It comprised two battalions. The first was commanded by Jean-Baptiste Dumonceau and served in Champagne. The second battalion fought in the Siege of Lille in 1792.

The future general, Louis Lahure, is believed to have served with the Belgian Legion after being forced into exile in the aftermath of the Brabant Revolution.

== See also ==
- Committee of United Belgians and Liégeois (1792–)
- Batavian Legion (1793)
