= 211th Battalion (American Legion), CEF =

The 211th Battalion, CEF was a unit in the Canadian Expeditionary Force during the First World War. Based in Vancouver, British Columbia, the unit began recruiting in early 1916 throughout British Columbia and Alberta. After sailing to England in December 1916, the battalion was transferred to the 8th Battalion, Canadian Railway Troops in March 1917. The 211th Battalion, CEF had one Officer Commanding: Lieut-Col. W. M. Sage.

== See also ==
- 97th Battalion (American Legion), CEF
- 212th Battalion (American Legion), CEF
- 237th Battalion (American Legion), CEF
