= Fort Logan, Colorado =

Coordinates: 39°38′N 105°2′W

Fort Logan, Colorado is a neighborhood of Englewood, Colorado south of Denver and is named for the former Fort Logan military post of the area.

In 1889, the town of Fort Logan was established; that included the base and surrounding land.
