= 97th Battalion (American Legion), CEF =

The 97th Battalion (American Legion), CEF, was an infantry battalion of the Great War Canadian Expeditionary Force. The 97th Battalion was authorized on 22 December 1915 and embarked for Britain in May 1916, but was halted in Aldershot, Nova Scotia when the American government protested the title of ‘American Legion,’ as the country was officially a neutral state. The delay caused a number of officers to resign, and a number of men deserted when it became clear they would not enter the front lines. Finally the designation ‘American Legion’ was dropped and the unit could proceed overseas. 31 officers and 798 other ranks boarded the RMS Olympic on 19 September 1916. The next month 270 men were absorbed by the Depots of The Royal Canadian Regiment, CEF and the rest, 428 soldiers, joined the Princess Patricia's Canadian Light Infantry, also, to provide reinforcements for the Canadian Corps in the field.

== Timeline ==
The 97th Battalion recruited in, and was mobilized at, Toronto, Ontario.

The 97th Battalion was commanded by Lt.-Col. A.B. Clarke and then Lt.-Col. W.L. Jolly from 18 September 1916 to 24 December 1916.

The 97th Battalion was awarded the battle honour THE GREAT WAR 1916.

The 97th Battalion (American Legion), CEF is not perpetuated by any Canadian Army unit.

== See also ==
- 211th Battalion (American Legion), CEF
- 212th Battalion (American Legion), CEF
- 237th Battalion (American Legion), CEF

== Bibliography ==
Notes

References

- Library and Archives Canada (2020). "Infantry" (PDF). Government of Canada.
- Meek, John F. (1971). Over the top! The Canadian Infantry in the First World War. Orangeville, Ont. OCLC 1226877. - Total pages: 188

== Sources ==
Canadian Expeditionary Force 1914–1919 by Col. G.W.L. Nicholson, CD, Queen's Printer, Ottawa, Ontario, 1962
