= 212th Battalion (American Legion), CEF =

The 212th Battalion, CEF was a unit in the Canadian Expeditionary Force during the First World War. Based in Winnipeg, Manitoba, the unit began recruiting in early 1916 throughout the province. The battalion was disbanded while still in Canada and the men transferred to the 97th Battalion, CEF. The 212th Battalion, CEF had one Officer Commanding: Lieut-Col. E. C. Pitman.

== See also ==
- 97th Battalion (American Legion), CEF
- 211th Battalion (American Legion), CEF
- 237th Battalion (American Legion), CEF
