= Hélène Durand =

Belgian botanist and botanical artist (1883-1934)

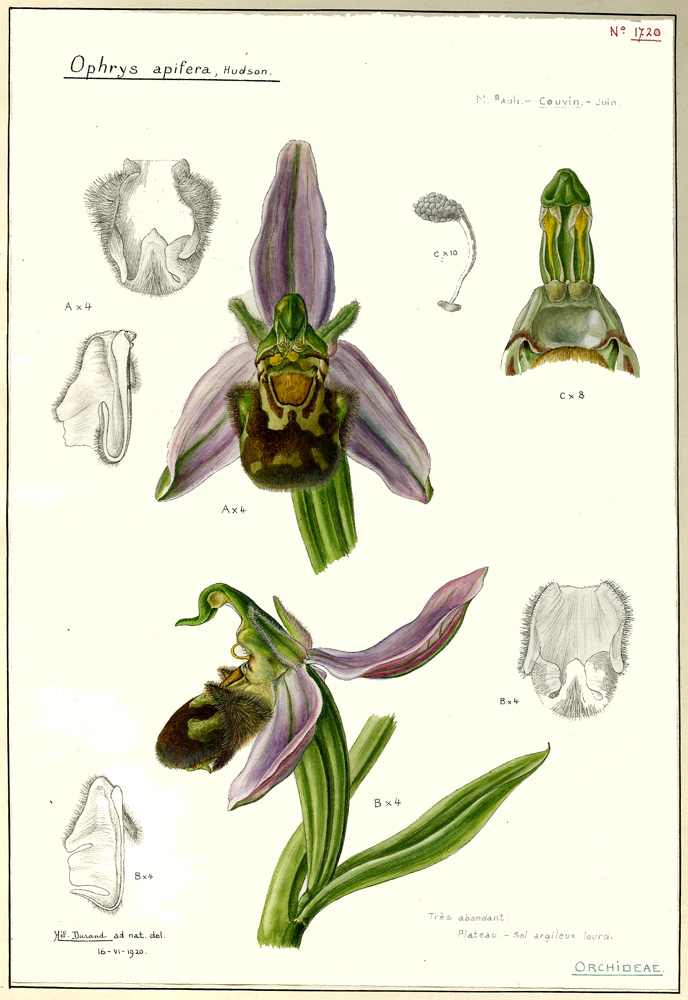
Ophrys apifera

Hélène Durand (9 August 1883 Watermael-Boitsfort - 4 August 1934 Uccle) was a Belgian botanical illustrator.

She was the daughter of Theophile Durand, a Director of the National Botanic Garden of Belgium between 1901 and 1912, and Sofie Van Eelde. Her training included courses in both art and botany, and for a while she worked at the Royal Belgian Institute of Natural Sciences. In 1912 she was employed on a full-time basis at the Garden, which is located in the grounds of Bouchout Castle in the town of Meise, just north of Brussels. From here she produced illustrations showing great scientific accuracy - these included line drawings and illustrations for the wood museum.

Her unpublished images on the gymnosperms are particularly attractive, and effectively capture the subtle colours and textures of their cones. The time devoted to her drawing of a cone of Abies procera amounted to more than 105 hours. Several of her illustrations have been published in scientific journals.

Hélène Durand shared an apartment with her sister Louise. She suffered from a lung condition which did not respond to the treatments tried. A stay at Keerbergen in the countryside led only to temporary relief, and she died in the night of 4 August 1934.

The standard author abbreviation H.Durand is used to indicate this person as the author when citing a botanical name. She worked on Sylloge Florae Congolanae with her father.
