= List of herbaria in Europe =

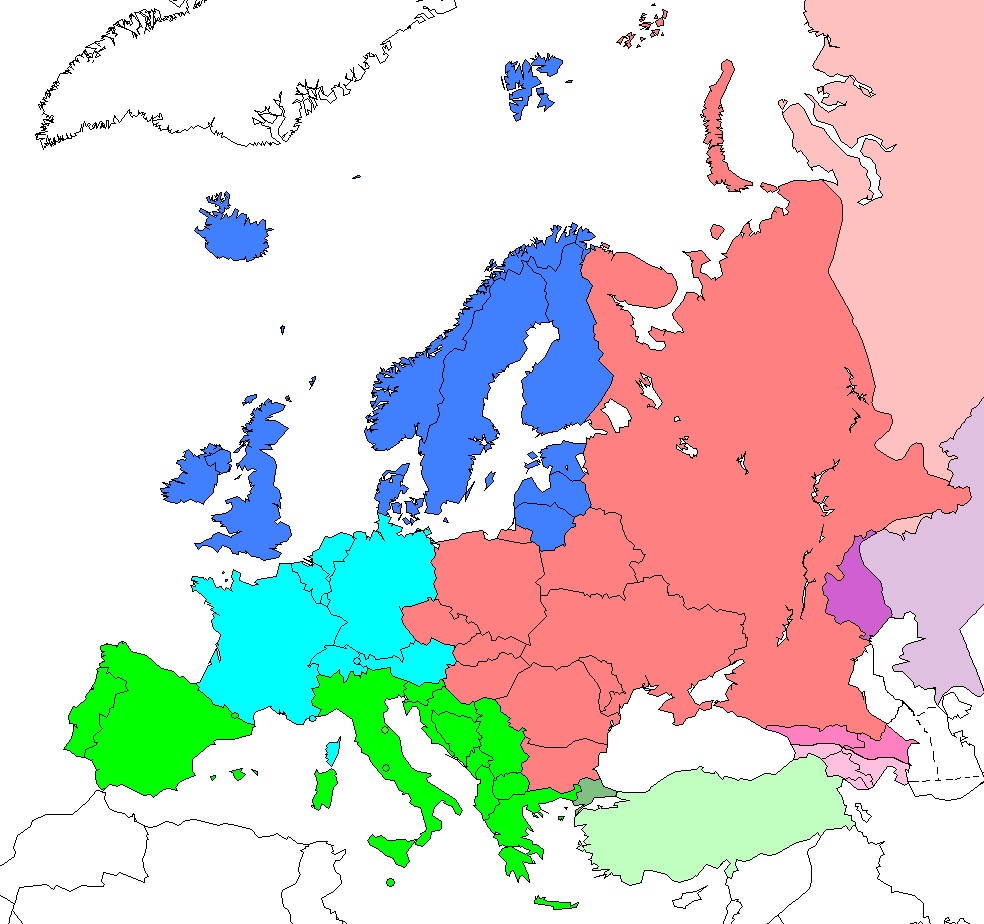
Map of Europe coded by region according to the United Nations geoscheme for Europe

This is a list of herbaria in Europe, organized first by region where the herbarium is located (using the United Nations geoscheme for Europe), then within each region by size of the collection. For other continents, see List of herbaria.

== Eastern Europe ==
The tables below list herbaria located in Eastern Europe as defined by the United Nations geoscheme for Europe.

=== Black Sea ===
The following table includes herbaria located in countries on the Black Sea, including Bulgaria, Moldova, Romania, and Ukraine.

Herbaria in countries on the Black Sea
Name	No. Specimens	Abbr.	Country	City	Website
"Alexandru Ioan Cuza" University	250,000	I	Romania	Iași	
Herbarium Bulgarian Academy of Science	160,000	SOM	Bulgaria	Sofia	
Herbarium Agricultural University of Plovdiv	150,000	SOA	Bulgaria	Plovdiv	
Herbarium Sofia University	106 000	SO	Bulgaria	Sofia	

=== Czech Republic ===
The following table includes herbaria located in the Czech Republic.

Herbaria in Czech Republic
Name	No. Specimens	Abbr.	Country	City	Website
Charles University in Prague	2,200,000	PRC	Czech Republic	Prague	

=== Hungary ===
The following table includes herbaria located in Hungary.

Herbaria in Hungary
Name	No. Specimens	Abbr.	Country	City	Website
Hungarian Natural History Museum - Department of Botany	2,000,000	BP	Hungary	Budapest	
Budakeszi Herbarium - International Dendrological Foundation	250,000	BK	Hungary	Budakeszi	

=== Poland ===
The following table includes herbaria located in Poland.

Herbaria in Poland
Name	No. Specimens	Abbr.	Country	City	Website
Władysław Szafer Institute of Botany, Polish Academy of Sciences	800,000	IB PAN	Poland	Kraków	

=== Russia ===
The following table includes herbaria located in European Russia.

Herbaria in Russia
Name	No. Specimens	Abbr.	Country	City	Website
Komarov Botanical Institute	7,160,000	LE	Russia	St. Petersburg	
Moscow State University	1,011,253	MW	Russia	Moscow	
Main Botanical Garden, Russia	700,000 (644,337 mounted)	MHA	Russia	Moscow	
Saint Petersburg University	700,000 (280,000 mounted)	LECB	Russia	Saint Petersburg	
N. I. Vavilov Institute of Plant Industry	380,000 (179,000 mounted)	WIR	Russia	Saint Petersburg	
Southern Federal University	350,000 (280,000 mounted)	RV	Russia	Rostov-on-Don	
Komi Scientific Centre, Russian Academy of Sciences, Ural Department	295,600	SYKO	Russia	Syktyvkar, Komi Republic	
Saint Petersburg S. M. Kirov Forestry Academy, I. P. Borodin Herbarium	200,000	KFTA	Russia	Saint Petersburg	,

=== Ukraine ===
- National Herbarium of Ukraine (KW)

== Northern Europe ==
The tables below list herbaria located in Northern Europe as defined by the United Nations geoscheme for Europe: Ireland, the British Isles, Baltic states, Scandinavia, and Iceland.

=== Baltic states ===
The following table includes herbaria located in the Baltic states: Estonia, Latvia, and Lithuania.

Herbaria in the Baltic states
Name	No. Specimens	Abbr.	Country	City	Website
Estonian University of Life Sciences	336,000	TAA	Estonia	Tartu	
University of Tartu	324,000	TU	Estonia	Tartu	
Vilnius University	300,000	WI	Lithuania	Vilnius	
University of Latvia, Riga	176,000	RIG	Latvia	Riga	
University of Latvia, Salaspils	175,000	LATV	Latvia	Salaspils	
Institute of Botany, Lithuania	130,000	BILAS	Lithuania	Vilnius	
Estonian Museum of Natural History	100,000	TAM	Estonia	Tallinn	
Tallinn Botanic Garden	85,000	TALL	Estonia	Tallinn	
National Botanic Garden of Latvia	50,000	HBA	Latvia	Salaspils	

=== Britain & Ireland ===
The following table includes herbaria located in Britain & Ireland.

Herbaria in the British Isles
Name	No. Specimens	Abbr.	Country	City	Website
Kew Herbarium	7,000,000	K	UK	Kew, England	
Natural History Museum, London	5,200,000	BM	UK	London, England	
Royal Botanic Garden, Edinburgh	2,000,000	E	UK	Edinburgh, Scotland	
University of Cambridge	1,000,000	CGE	UK	Cambridge, England	
University of Manchester	1,000,000	MANCH	UK	Manchester, England	
National Botanic Gardens, Ireland	600,000	DBN	Ireland	Dublin	
National Museums & Galleries of Wales	550,000	NMW	UK	Cardiff, Wales	
Fielding-Druce Herbarium, University of Oxford	500,000	OXF	UK	Oxford, England	
University of Reading	400,000	RNG	UK	Reading, England	
CABI Bioscience UK Centre	385,000	IMI	UK	Surrey, England	
World Museum Liverpool	350,000	LIV	UK	Liverpool, England	
Daubeny Herbarium, University of Oxford	300,000	FHO	UK	Oxford, England	
Trinity College	230,000	TCD	Ireland	Dublin	
University of Birmingham	150,000	BIRM	UK	Birmingham, England	
Royal Horticultural Society (RHS Garden Wisley)	140,000	WSY	UK	Wisley, England	
University of Leicester	125,000	LTR	UK	Leicester, England	
University of Aberdeen	120,000	ABD	UK	Aberdeen, Scotland	
South London Botanical Institute	100,000	SLBI	UK	London, England	
Nottingham Natural History Museum	91,000	NOT	UK	Nottingham, England	
Leicestershire Museums	90,000	LSR	UK	Leicester, England	
British Antarctic Survey	40,000	AAS	UK	Cambridge, England	
Linnean Society	14,000	LINN	UK	London, England	
Derby Museum and Art Gallery	8,000	DBY	UK	Derby, England	

=== Nordic countries ===
The following table includes herbaria located in the Nordic countries:

Herbaria in Scandinavia
Name	No. Specimens	Abbr.	Country	City	Website
Swedish Museum of Natural History (Naturhistoriska riksmuseet)	4,400,000	S	Sweden	Stockholm	
University of Helsinki	3,000,000	H	Finland	Helsinki	
Uppsala University	3,000,000	UPS	Sweden	Uppsala	
University of Copenhagen	2,510,000	C	Denmark	Copenhagen	
Botanical Museum, Lund	2,500,000	LD	Sweden	Lund	
Botanical Museum, Oslo	1,800,000	O	Norway	Oslo	
University of Gothenburg	1,600,000	GB	Sweden	Gothenburg	
University of Turku	932,000	TUR	Finland	Turku	
Aarhus University	700,000	AAU	Denmark	Aarhus	
University of Bergen	700,000	BG	Norway	Bergen	
University of Oulu	500,000	OULU	Finland	Oulu	
Norwegian University of Science and Technology	430,000	TRH	Norway	Trondheim	
University of Tromsø	320,000	TROM	Norway	Tromsø	
Kuopio Natural History Museum	253,000	KUO	Finland	Kuopio	
University of Jyväskylä	200,000	JYV	Finland	Jyväskylä	
Icelandic Institute of Natural History	170,000	ICEL	Iceland	Reykjavík	
Umeå University	170,000	UME	Sweden	Umeå	
Biological Museum, Oskarshamn	155,000	OHN	Sweden	Oskarshamn	
Royal Veterinary and Agricultural University	90,000	CP	Denmark	Copenhagen	
Icelandic Institute of Natural History, Akureyri Division	64,000	AMNH	Iceland	Akureyri	

== Southern Europe ==
The tables below list herbaria located in Southern Europe as defined by the United Nations geoscheme for Europe.

=== Balkans ===
The following table includes herbaria located in the western and southern Balkans, including Albania, Greece and nations formerly part of Yugoslavia.

Herbaria in the Balkans
Name	No. Specimens	Abbr.	Country	City	Website
Herbarium of the Balkan Peninsula, Natural History Museum	490,000	BEO	Serbia	Belgrade	
Goulandris Natural History Museum	180,000	ATH	Greece	Kifissia	
Herbarium Croaticum, University of Zagreb	180,000	ZA	Croatia	Zagreb	
University of Belgrade	150,000	BEOU	Serbia	Belgrade	
University of Ljubljana	150,000	LJU	Slovenia	Ljubljana	
University of Patras	150,000	UPA	Greece	Patras	
National and Kapodistrian University of Athens	117,000	ATHU	Greece	Athens	
Zemaljski Muzej Bosne I. Herzegovine	110,000	SARA	Bosnia and Herzegovina	Sarajevo	
Herbarium Ivo and Marija Horvat, University of Zagreb	78,000	ZAHO	Croatia	Zagreb	
University of Novi Sad	60,000	BUNS	Serbia	Novi Sad	
Prirodoslovni Muzej Slovenije	50,000	LJM	Slovenia	Ljubljana	
Aristotle University of Thessaloniki	30,000	TAU	Greece	Thessaloniki	
Rudjer Boskovic Institute	20,000	ADRZ	Croatia	Zagreb	
Croatian Mycological Society	20,000	CNF	Croatia	Zagreb	
Herbar Biokovskog Podrucja, Institut Planina i More	20,000	MAKAR	Croatia	Makarska	
Agricultural University of Athens	15,000	ACA	Greece	Athens	

=== Italy ===
The following table includes herbaria located in Italy, including Sicily and Sardinia.

Herbaria in Italy
Name	No. Specimens	Abbr.	Country	City	Website
Museo di Storia Naturale dell'Università	3,650,000	FI	Italy	Florence	
Università degli Studi di Roma La Sapienza	1,120,000	RO	Italy	Rome	
Università degli Studi di Torino	1,000,000	TO	Italy	Turin	
Herbarium Mediterraneum Panormitanum	500,000	PAL	Italy	Palermo, Sicily	
Università degli Studi di Padova	300,000	PAD	Italy	Padua	
Università di Pisa	300,000	PI	Italy	Pisa	
Museo Civico di Storia Naturale	270,000	VER	Italy	Verona	
Università di Camerino	250,000	CAME	Italy	Camerino	
Università di Catania	200,000	CAT	Italy	Catania, Sicily	
Centro Studi Erbario Tropicale, Università degli Studi di Firenze	200,000	FT	Italy	Florence	
Museo Tridentino di Scienze Naturali	200,000	TR	Italy	Trento, Trentino	
Università degli Studi di Trieste	200,000	TSB	Italy	Trieste	
Università di Pavia	180,000	PAV	Italy	Pavia	
Università Degli Studi di Napoli Federico II	170,000	NAP	Italy	Naples, Napoli	
Centro Ricerche Floristiche Marche	150,000	PESA	Italy	Pesaro	
Università di Bologna	130,000	BOLO	Italy	Bologna	
Museo Friulano di Storia Naturale	130,000	MFU	Italy	Udine	
Università degli Studi di Roma Tre	118,000	URT	Italy	Rome	
Università di Sassari	100,000	SS	Italy	Sassari, Sardinia	
Museo Civico di Storia Naturale	100,000	TSM	Italy	Trieste	
Università degli Studi di Cagliari	80,000	CAG	Italy	Cagliari, Sardinia	
Università di Genova	75,000	GE	Italy	Genoa	
Università di Siena	75,000	SIENA	Italy	Siena	
Università degli Studi di Milano	60,000	MI	Italy	Milan	
Museo Civico di Storia Naturale Giacomo Doria	55,000	GDOR	Italy	Genoa	
Museo Civico di Rovereto	51,000	ROV	Italy	Rovereto, Trentino	
Museo Regionale di Scienze Naturali	50,000	MRSN	Italy	Turin	
Università degli Studi di Napoli	50,000	PORUN	Italy	Portici, Naples	

=== Spain and Portugal ===
The following table includes herbaria located in Spain and Portugal, including the Canary Islands.

Herbaria in Spain and Portugal
Name	No. Specimens	Abbr.	Country	City	Website
Real Jardín Botánico	850,000	MA	Spain	Madrid	
University of Coimbra	800,000	COI	Portugal	Coimbra	
Institut Botànic de Barcelona	700,000	BC	Spain	Barcelona	
Instituto de Investigação Científica Tropical	300,000	LISC	Portugal	Lisbon	
Universitat de Barcelona	300,000	BCN	Spain	Barcelona	
Universitat de Sevilla	300,000	SEV	Spain	Seville	
Instituto Pirenaico de Ecología, C.S.I.C.	260,000	JACA	Spain	Jaca	
Museu Nacional de História Natural, Lisboa	250,000	LISU	Portugal	Lisbon	
Universidad Complutense	175,000	MAF	Spain	Madrid	
Universitat de València	160,000	VAL	Spain	Valencia	
Museo de Ciencias Naturales de Alava	140,000	VIT	Spain	Vitoria-Gasteiz	
Universidad de Salamanca	110,000	SALA	Spain	Salamanca	
Estação Agronómica Nacional	90,000	LISE	Portugal	Oeiras	
Universidad de La Laguna	83,000	TFC	Spain	La Laguna, Canary Islands	
Universidad de Córdoba	80,000	COA	Spain	Córdoba	
Universidad de León	78,000	LEB	Spain	León	
Alto de Zorroaga s.n.	75,000	ARAN	Spain	San Sebastián	
Universidade do Porto	73,800	PO	Portugal	Porto	
Universidad de Santiago de Compostela	71,000	SANT	Spain	Santiago de Compostela, Galicia	
Universidad de Murcia	61,000	MUB	Spain	Murcia	
Universidad de Málaga	55,000	MGC	Spain	Málaga	
Universidad de Alicante	50,000	ABH	Spain	Alicante	
Jardín Botánico Atlántico, Ayuntamiento de Gijón	50,000	JBAG	Spain	Gijón, Asturias	
Universitat de Girona	45,000	HGI	Spain	Girona	
University of Algarve	27,000	ALGU	Portugal	Faro	

== Western Europe ==
The tables below list herbaria located in Western Europe as defined by the United Nations geoscheme for Europe: France, Germany, Austria, Switzerland, and the Low Countries.

=== Austria and Switzerland ===
The following table includes herbaria located in Austria and Switzerland, as well as Liechtenstein.

Herbaria in Austria and Switzerland
Name	No. Specimens	Abbr.	Country	City	Website
Conservatoire et Jardin botaniques de la Ville de Genève	6,000,000	G	Switzerland	Geneva	
Naturhistorisches Museum Wien	5,000,000	W	Austria	Vienna	
ETH Zurich	2,000,000	ZT	Switzerland	Zürich	
University of Zurich	1,500,000	Z	Switzerland	Zürich	
University of Vienna	1,400,000	WU	Austria	Vienna	
University of Graz	800,000	GZU	Austria	Graz	
Musée et Jardins Botaniques Cantonaux	800,000	LAU	Switzerland	Lausanne	
Oberösterreichischen Landesmuseums	700,000	LI	Austria	Linz	
University of Basel	520,000	BAS, BASBG	Switzerland	Basel	
Université de Neuchâtel	455,000	NEU	Switzerland	Neuchâtel	
University of Bern	410,000	BERN	Switzerland	Bern	
Steiermärkisches Landesmuseum Joanneum	350,000	GJO	Austria	Graz	
Tyrolean State Museum	300,000	IBF	Austria	Innsbruck	
Museo cantonale di storia naturale	200,000	LUG	Switzerland	Lugano	
Landesmuseum für Kärnten	160,000	KL	Austria	Klagenfurt	
Haus der Natur	100,000	SZB	Austria	Salzburg	
University of Innsbruck	100,000	IB	Austria	Innsbruck	
Natur-Museum Luzern	90,000	NMLU	Switzerland	Lucerne	
University of Salzburg	63,000	SZU	Austria	Salzburg	
Federal Research and Training Centre for Forests, Natural Hazards and Landscape (BFW)	50,000	WFBVA	Austria	Vienna	

=== France ===
The following table includes herbaria located in France (including Corsica) and Monaco.

Herbaria in France
Name	No. Specimens	Abbr.	Country	City	Website
Muséum National d'Histoire Naturelle	9,500,000	P, PC	France	Paris	
Université Montpellier	4,000,000	MPU	France	Montpellier	
Université Claude Bernard Lyon 1	4,000,000	LY	France	Lyon	
Muséum d'Histoire Naturelle de Grenoble	700,000	GRM	France	Grenoble	
Institut des Herbiers Universitaires de Clermont-Ferrand	550,000	CLF	France	Clermont-Ferrand	
Muséum d'Histoire Naturelle d'Aix-en-Provence	420,000	AIX	France	Aix-en-Provence	
Muséum d'Histoire Naturelle d'Autun	400,000	AUT	France	Autun	
Muséum Requien	400,000	AV	France	Avignon	
Jardin Botanique de la Ville de Bordeaux	350,000	BORD	France	Bordeaux	
Muséum des sciences naturelles d'Angers	350,000	ANG	France	Angers	
Institut de Botanique	300,000	STR	France	Strasbourg	
Université Paul Sabatier	300,000	TL	France	Toulouse	
Muséum-Jardin des Sciences	250,000	MJSD	France	Dijon	
Université Catholiques de l'Ouest	250,000	ANG	France	Angers	
Muséum d'Histoire naturelle de Besançon	250,000	BESA	France	Besançon	
Centre d'Étude et de Conservation des Ressources Végétales	200,000	GABAS	France	Bayonne	
Muséum d'Histoire Naturelle de Nice	200,000	NICE	France	Nice	
Société Nationale des Sciences Naturelles et Mathématiques de Cherbourg	200,000	CHE	France	Cherbourg	
Jardin Botanique de la Ville de Lyon	140,000	LYJB	France	Lyon	
Campus scientifique de Beaulieu and Campus Villejean	112,000	REN	France	Rennes	
Conservatoire Botanique National Alpin	100,000	GAP	France	Gap	
Muséum d'Histoire Naturelle de Nantes	100,000	NTM	France	Nantes	

=== Germany ===
The following table includes herbaria located in Germany.

Herbaria in Germany
Name	No. Specimens	Abbr.	Country	City	Website
Botanischer Garten und Botanisches Museum Berlin-Dahlem, Zentraleinrichtung der Freien Universität Berlin	3,000,000	B	Germany	Berlin	
University of Jena	3,000,000	JE	Germany	Jena	
Botanische Staatssammlung München	2,500,000	M	Germany	Munich	
Biozentrum Klein-Flottbek	1,400,000	HBG	Germany	Hamburg	
Forschungsinstitut Senckenberg	1,000,000	FR	Germany	Frankfurt am Main	
Staatliches Museum für Naturkunde	1,000,000	STU	Germany	Stuttgart	
University of Göttingen	750,000	GOET	Germany	Göttingen	
Staatliches Museum für Naturkunde Karlsruhe	650,000	KR	Germany	Karlsruhe	
Leibniz Institute of Plant Genetics and Crop Plant Research	545,000	GAT	Germany	Gatersleben	
Martin Luther University Halle-Wittenberg	450,000	HAL	Germany	Halle	
Übersee-Museum	375,000	BREM	Germany	Bremen	
TU Dresden	350,000	DR	Germany	Dresden	
Marburg University	300,000	MB	Germany	Marburg	
Westfälisches Museum für Naturkunde	300,000	MSTR	Germany	Münster	
University of Tübingen	250,000	TUB	Germany	Tübingen	
University of Greifswald	250,000	GFW	Germany	Greifswald	
Heidelberg University	250,000	HEID	Germany	Heidelberg	
Staatliches Museum für Naturkunde Görlitz	178,000	GLM	Germany	Görlitz	
Leipzig University	170,000	LZ	Germany	Leipzig	
University of Erlangen–Nuremberg	158,000	ER	Germany	Erlangen	
Palatinate Museum of Natural History (Pfalzmuseum für Naturkunde)	150,000	POLL	Germany	Bad Dürkheim	
LMU Munich	140,000	MSB	Germany	München	
University of Regensburg	140,000	REG	Germany	Regensburg	
Museum für Naturkunde, Berlin	100,000	BHUPM	Germany	Berlin	
Museum Wiesbaden	100,000	WIES	Germany	Wiesbaden	
University of Hohenheim (210)	100,000	HOH	Germany	Stuttgart	
Bundesamt für Naturschutz	90,000	BNL	Germany	Bonn	
Kiel University	90,000	KIEL	Germany	Kiel	

=== Low Countries ===
The following table includes herbaria located in Belgium, Luxembourg, Netherlands and Cyprus

Herbaria in the Low Countries
Name	No. Specimens	Abbr.	Country	City	Website
Naturalis Biodiversity Center (Nationaal Herbarium Nederland)	5,700,000	L, U, WAG	Netherlands	Leiden	
Meise Botanic Garden	4,000,000	BR	Belgium	Meise	
University of Liège	400,000	LG	Belgium	Liège	
Ghent University	250,000	GENT	Belgium	Ghent	
Université libre de Bruxelles	215,000	BRLU	Belgium	Brussels	
Adviesbureau voor Bryologie en Lichenologie	50,000	ABL	Netherlands	Soest	
University of Groningen	50,000	GRO	Netherlands	Haren	
Musée national d'histoire naturelle	50,000	LUX	Luxembourg	Luxembourg	
Natuurhistorisch Museum Maastricht	50,000	MAAS	Netherlands	Maastricht	
Near East University Herbarium	6,500	NEUN	Cyprus	Nicosia	
