= List of botanical gardens in Belgium =

Some botanical gardens in Belgium have collections consisting entirely of Belgium native and endemic species, while most have collections that include plants from around the world. There are botanical gardens and arboreta in all states and territories of Belgium. Most are administered by local governments, while some are privately owned.

- Antwerp Botanic Garden
- Bokrijk Arboretum
- Botanical Garden of Brussels
- Ghent University Botanic Garden
- Arboretum Kalmthout – Kalmthout
- Hortus Botanicus Lovaniensis – Leuven
- Botanical Garden of Mechelen
- Botanic Garden Meise
- Arboretum Wespelaar
- Arboretum Provinciaal Domein Het Leen
