= Boekhoudt =

Boekhoudt is a surname. Notable people with the surname include:

- Alfonso Boekhoudt (born 1965), Aruban politician
- Alysha Boekhoudt (born 1993), Aruban model and beauty pageant titleholder

== See also ==
- Boekhout
