= Bouchout Castle =

Castle in Meise, Belgium

- Kasteel van Bouchout (Dutch); Château de Bouchout (French)
- Meise, Flemish Brabant
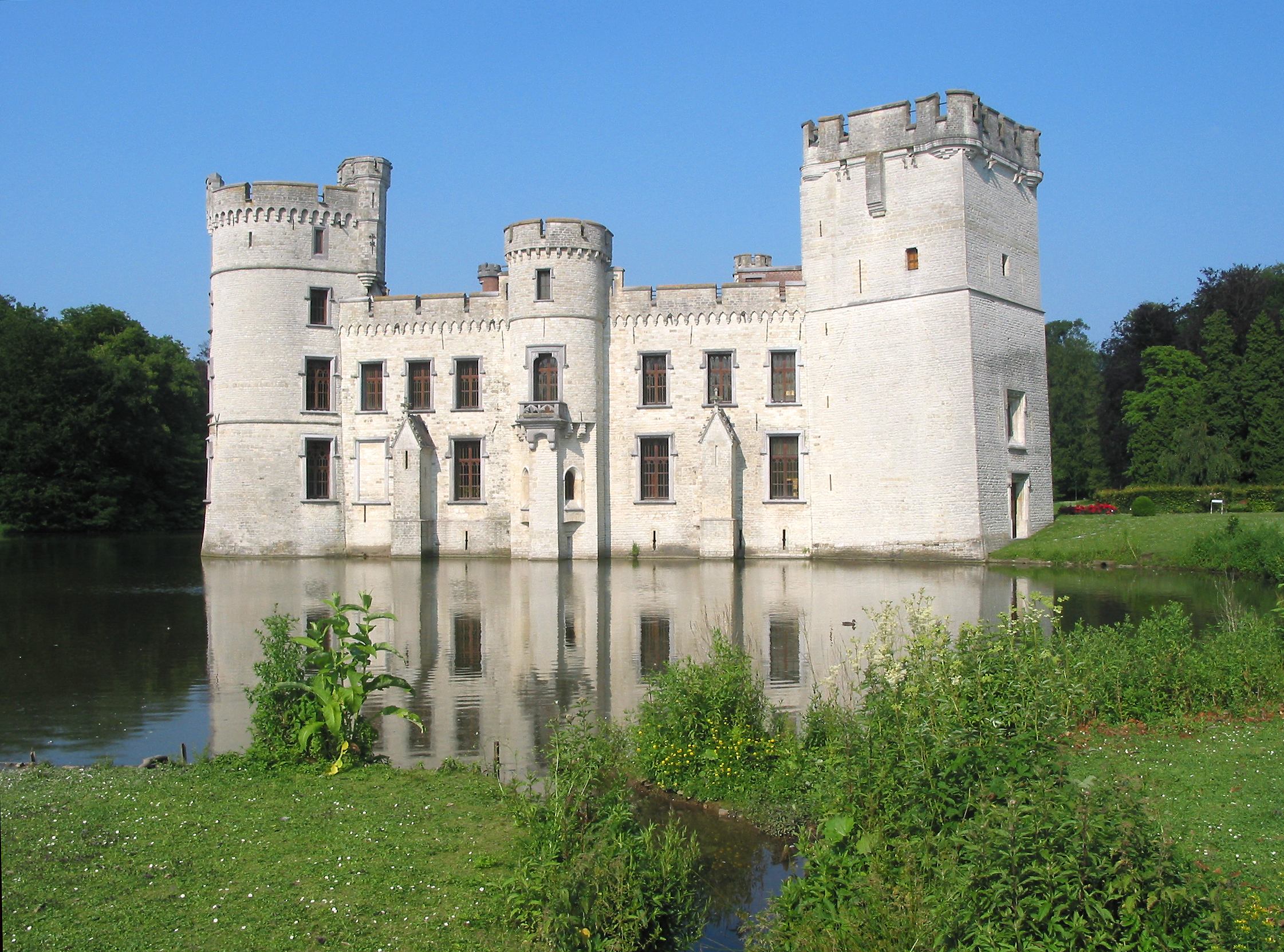
- Bouchout Castle, as seen from the west. The square Donjon tower (c. 1300) is at the right.

Site information
- Type: Castle
- Owner: Belgian state

Location
- Coordinates: 50°55′41.16″N 4°19′43.68″E

Site history
- Built: 1150
- Materials: Sandstone

Bouchout Castle (Dutch: Kasteel van Bouchout, pronounced [kɑˈsteːl vɑm ˈbuxʌut]; French: Château de Bouchout, pronounced [ʃɑto d(ə) bukawt]) is a castle in Meise, Flemish Brabant, Belgium. In the 12th century, this territory of the young Duchy of Brabant was strategically positioned between the County of Flanders and the Berthout family, lords of Grimbergen. Most likely, the first fortification was built by Wouter van Craaynem at the end of the Grimbergen Wars (1150–1170). Bouchout Castle is situated at an altitude of 32 metres (105 ft).

At about 1300, the Donjon tower of Bouchout Castle was erected by Daniel van Bouchout, a knight who fought gloriously at the Battle of Worringen. In the 15th and 16th centuries, Bouchout Castle was owned by the Van der Marck and van Sevenbergen sayd Transylvanus families. The castle fell into disrepair due to lack of maintenance, while the Spanish dominance and the iconoclastic fury further worsened its condition.

The first major renovation was performed by Christoffel d'Assonville in about 1600. The rectangular medieval Bouchout Castle was surrounded by a large pond and could only be reached by a long drawbridge. At the end of the 17th century, Peter-Ferdinand Roose transformed the castle into a Renaissance château, surrounded by French ornamental gardens. The castle was partly destroyed during the French Revolution period (1800–1830). Again, the castle was restored in 1832 by Count Amadeus de Beauffort, who gave Bouchout Castle its current neo-Gothic appearance.

From 1879 until 1927, Empress Charlotte of Mexico lived at the Bouchout Domain. Her husband Emperor Maximilian I was executed by Mexican Republicans in 1867. Thereafter Charlotte led a secluded life at Bouchout Castle. Since 1938, the Bouchout Domain has developed into a botanic garden: the National Botanic Garden of Belgium (1938–2014) or Meise Botanic Garden (2014–present). Since the last renovation in 1987–1989, the castle and its rooms are now being used for meetings, lectures and exhibitions.

== Toponymy ==
In spite of its French-like spelling, Bouchout, pronounced [buʃu] in French, is a Flemish name, which would be written Boekhout in modern script (alternative spelling Boechout), and pronounced [bukhɔut] or Book-Howt. It simply means "beech", boek or boekhout being a dialectal variant of the Dutch beuk. This toponym is frequent in the Dutch-speaking area.

The alternative etymology of boog-hout, meaning "keep your bow tensed", since the castle was positioned at a very strategic military location, is not substantiated.

== Origins ==
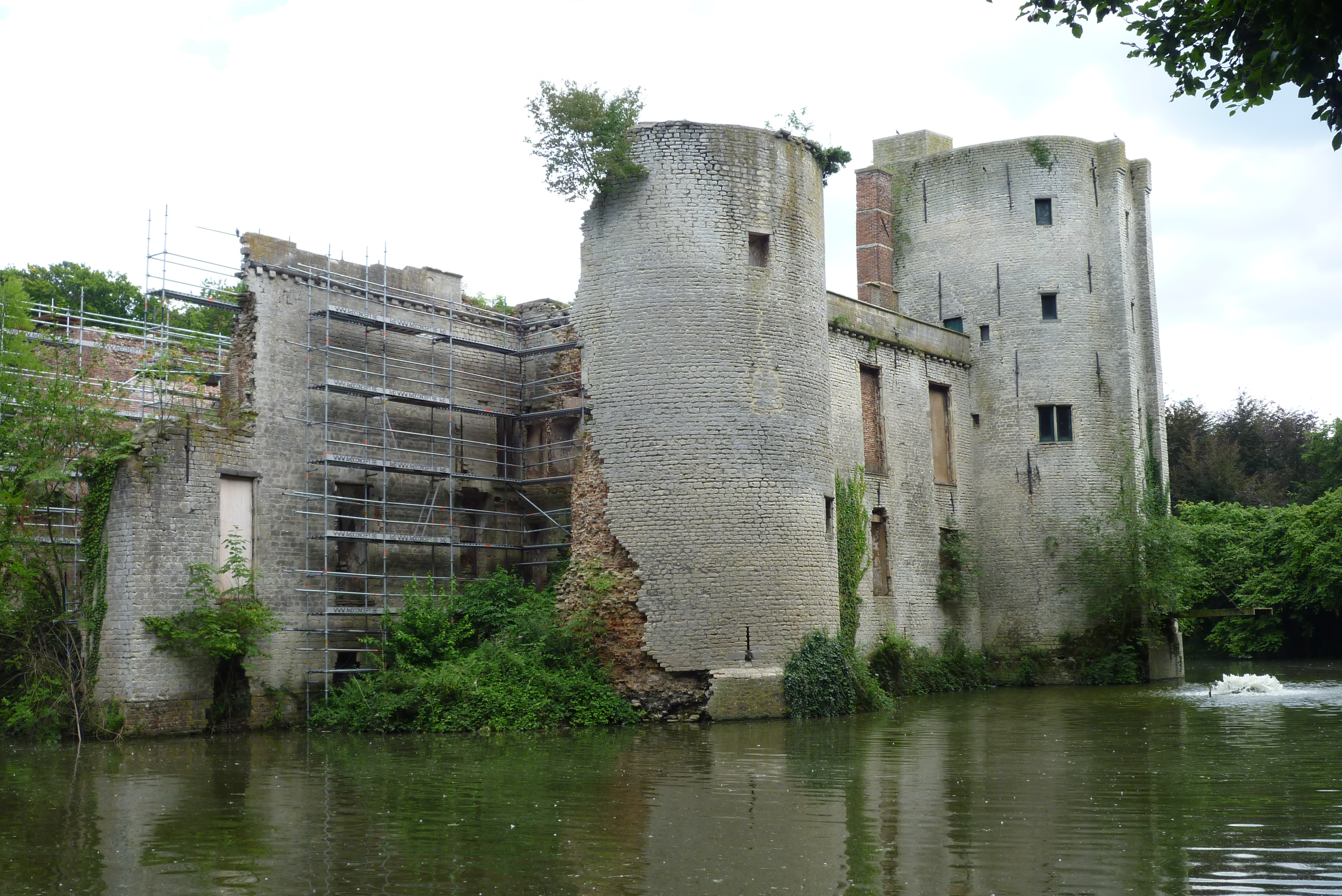
Ruins of Grimbergen Castle. At this site, the noble medieval Berthout family owned a castle from which they ruled their territory. However, their disloyalty towards the Dukes of Leuven was severely punished by a complete destruction of their wooden castle (Grimbergen wars). In the 16th century, Berthout's descendants erected a novel Prince Castle which flourished for a number of centuries. It was destroyed at the end of World War II by retreating German troops. The Donjon tower was restored in 1992.

During the first part of the 12th century, the territory of Bouchout played an important role in the foundation of the Duchy of Brabant. This Brabant territory was strategically positioned between the County of Flanders and the rebellious knights of Grimbergen. In the centre, the original territory was swampy and mainly consisted of beech trees. It was called "Boc-holt", which may point towards the origin of the castle's name, Boekhout.

During this period, Godfrey I, Duke of Leuven settled peace with the Count of Flanders, so he could focus on establishing a stable Duchy. He experienced however that the Berthouts, lords of Grimbergen, were not loyal to him. The Berthout family owned a mighty castle at Grimbergen and thereby controlled the important trade routes from Bruges to Cologne (Germany). Despite a number of attempts, Godfrey I and II did not succeed in defeating the Berthout family (Grimbergen Wars).

Godfrey III decided to build two fortifications in the direct vicinity of Berthout Castle. The first one, Nedelaar Castle, was constructed in 1148 directly on the other side of river Zenne. The second one, at the Bouchout Domain, was constructed by Wouter van Craaynem (Kraainem, Crainhem) who received the domain from Godfrey III. In that same period, in 1159, the Brabant troops assisted by Flanders, defeated the Berthout family after twenty years of Grimbergen wars. The once so mighty Berthout Castle was burnt completely.

It is not completely clear what Bouchout Castle looked like in the second half of the 12th century. According to Cantillon the fortification was already a strong castle. However, Willem van Craaynem, who inherited the Bouchout Domain from his father Wouter, only owned about 120 to 160 hectares (300 to 400 acres) of land in about 1160–1170. As for many minor noblemen at that time, it is therefore also possible that "Bouchout Castle" was no more than a fortified house at the centre of the swampy Bouchout domain.

== Donjon tower ==
Daniel van Bouchout (Boechout and also Wanghe), the grandson of Willem van Craaynem, is one of the most famous members of the Bouchout family. He was the first one to use the name "Van Bouchout" and fought at the Battle of Worringen in 1288. It was Daniel who played a major role in capturing Reinoud van Gelre resulting in a glorious victory for Duke Jan I van Brabant. Thereafter knight Daniel van Bouchout became one of the duke's advisors.

Several sources, including Doperé and Ubregts, strongly suggest that it was knight Daniel who transformed the former fortified house into a mighty castle at about 1300. It included a large Donjon and five subsequent canals with an enormous drawbridge of 10 m (33 ft) in length. The Donjon Tower is still preserved and is believed to be the oldest part of the current Bouchout Castle. This military Donjon has two levels and a platform. Each level has functional loopholes. The neo-Gothic windows at level one most likely were made during the renovations of 1832, while the right-angled windows of level 2 are more original. The upper platform has battlements and merlons. At the court site, the coat of arms of the Bouchout family is visible (a red cross).

Images of Bouchout Castle
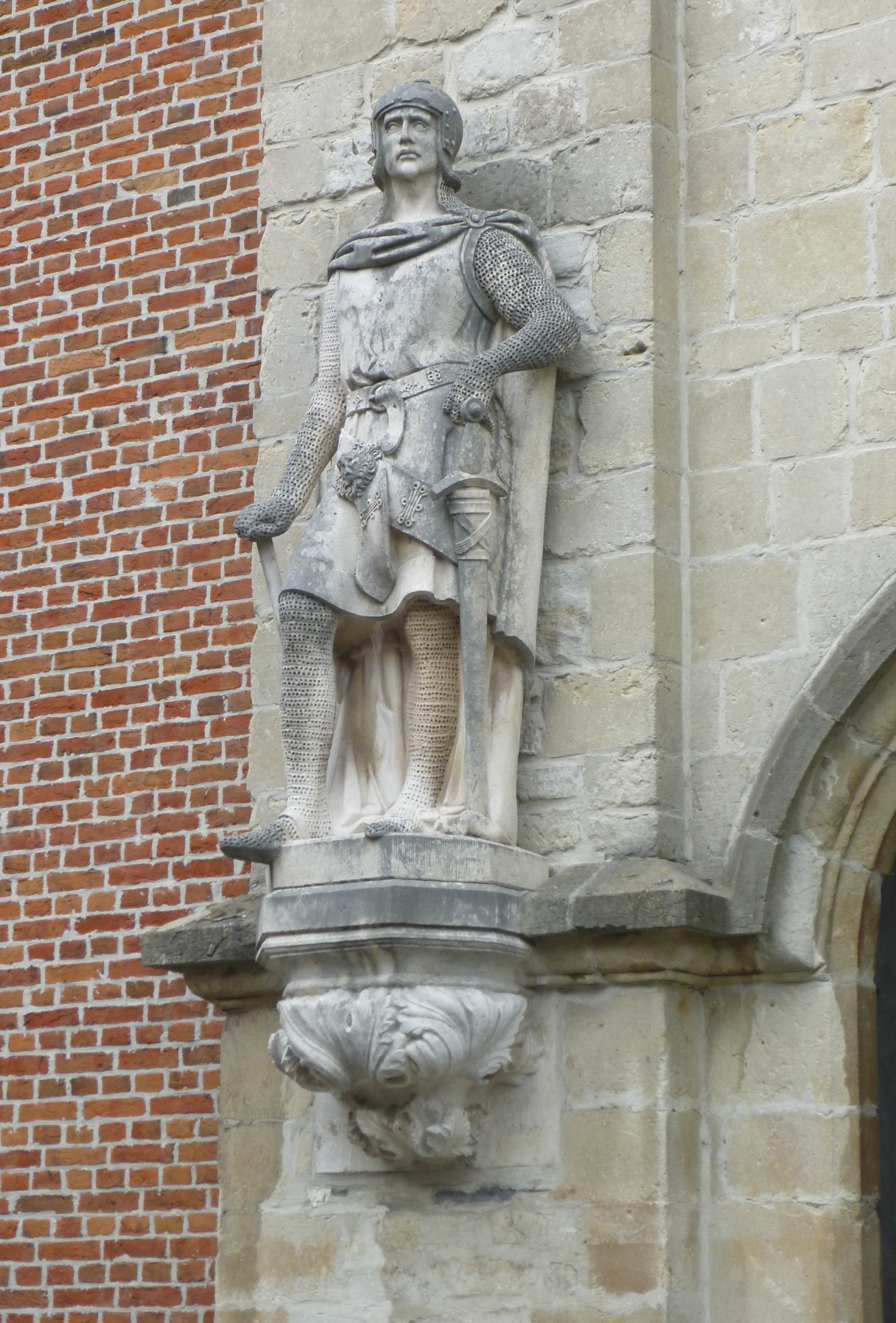
Knight Daniel van Bouchout at the wall of Bouchout Castle's Court of Honour opposite the Donjon tower. Daniel van Bouchout gloriously fought at the Battle of Worringen in 1288.

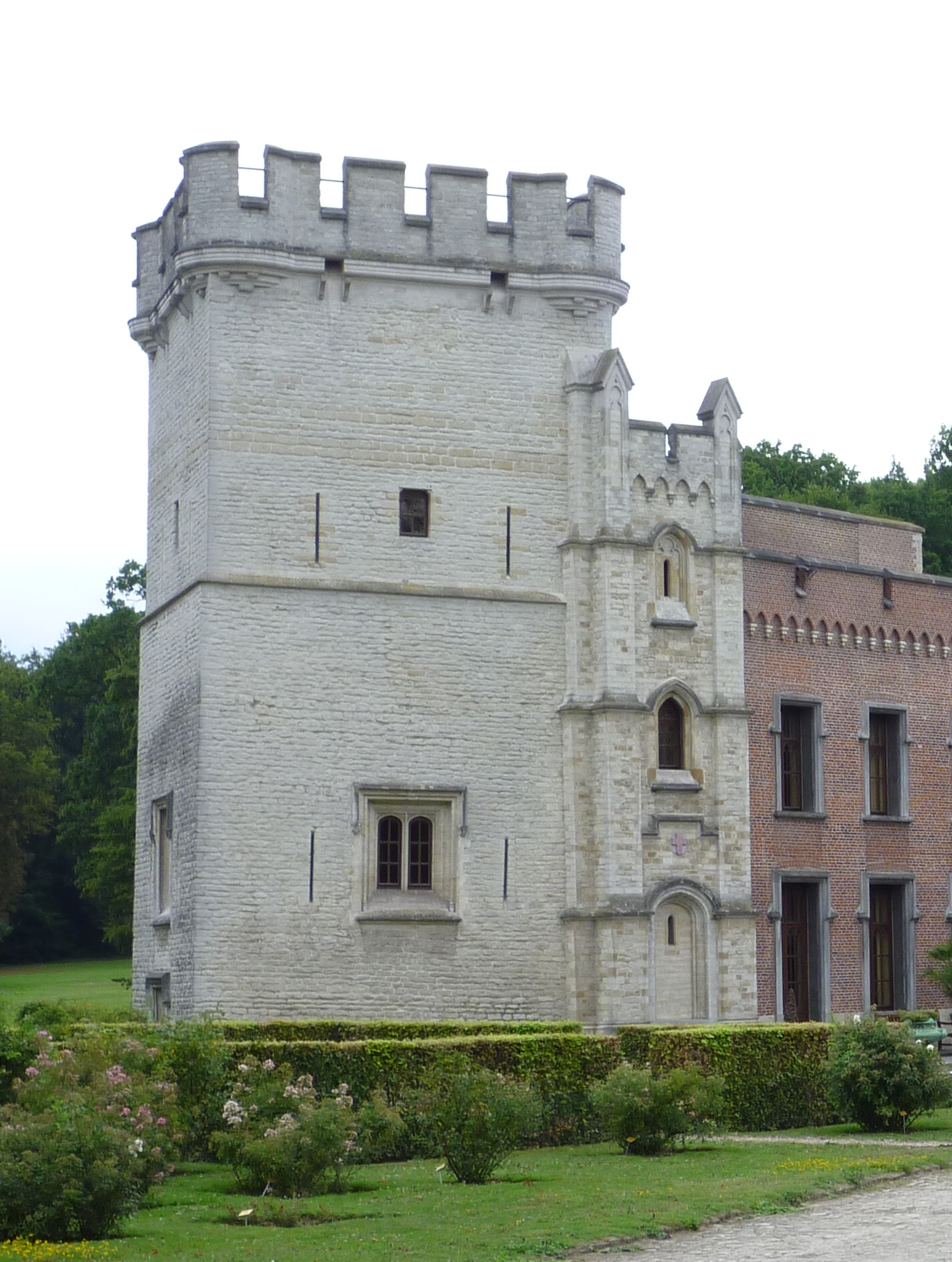
The Donjon Tower of Bouchout Castle, 20 m (66 ft) in height and strong walls 1 m (3.3 ft) thick. It was built c. 1300 by knight Daniel van Bouchout

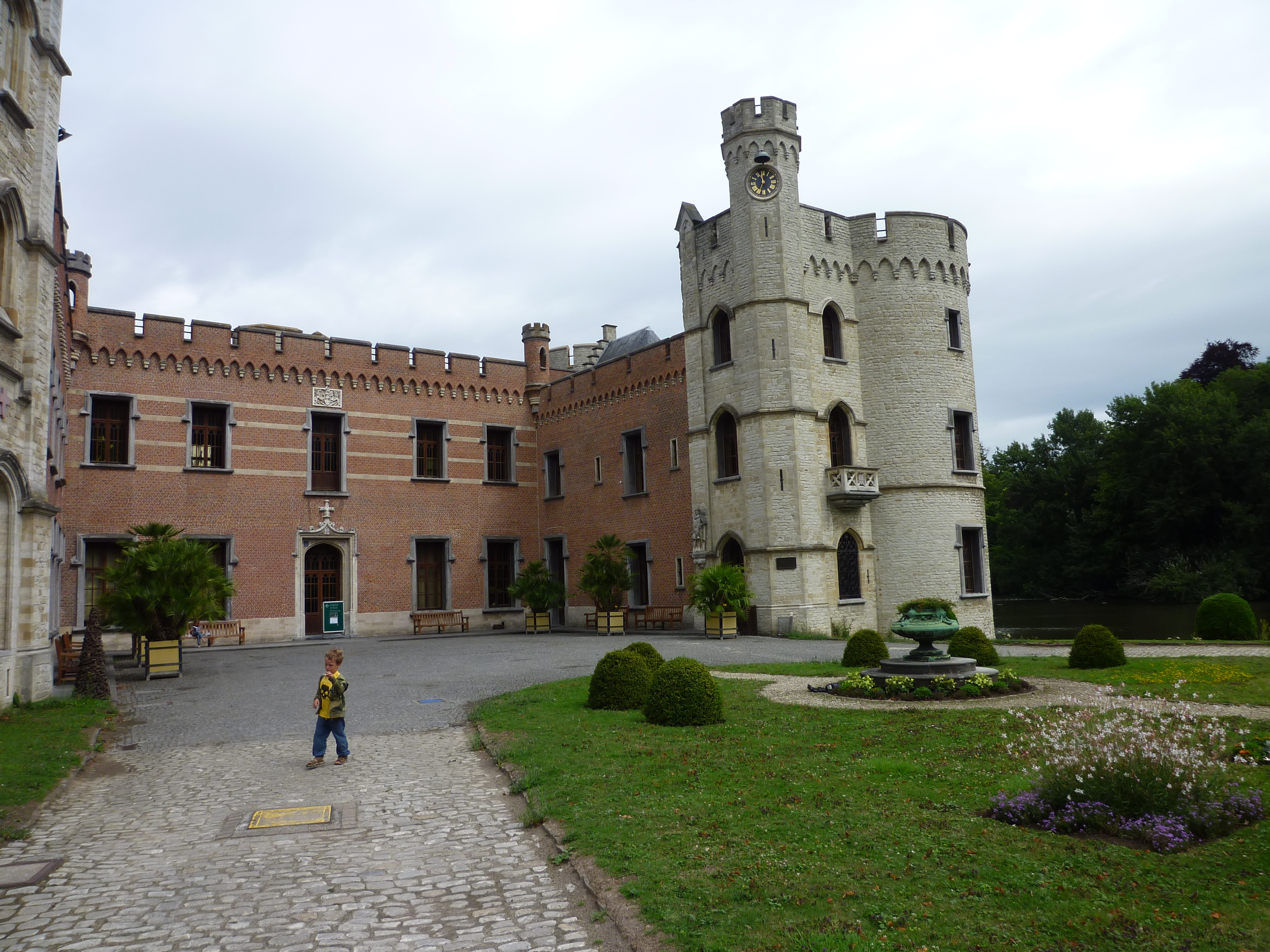
Court of Honour, displaying neo-Gothic features added by count Amadeus de Beauffort during the 1832 restoration.

A second historical member of this family was knight Jan van Bouchout (c. 1320–1391), grandson of Daniel.

In 1355, Duchess Johanna succeeded her father, Duke Jan III of Brabant. This succession led to a war with Flanders, since its Lord – Louis II, Count of Flanders – was married to Margaret, the second daughter of Duke Jan III. The Brabant forces were beaten in 1356 at Scheut and most likely also Bouchout Castle was taken. After peace was restored, Jan became commander of Brussels. He fought against the Lord of Gerle at the battle of Baesweiler in 1371, but the Brabant troops were defeated.

In 1386 however, he led a successful attack on the city of Grave at the river Meuse, thereby restoring his military distinction. Jan married Joanna van Hellebeke, but the couple did not get any heirs. It is known, however, that Jan was the father of a large number of natural descendants, who are known as "the children of Bouchout".

At the end of the 14th century, the Bouchout family extended their properties which included Blaasvelt, Humbeek, van Loenhout and Diepensteyn Castle. The direct family line became extinct however and the last representative, Margareta van Bouchout, married Everhard van der Marck in the middle of the 15th century. Thereafter, Bouchout Castle was owned by the Van der Marck family (1476–1537) and the Transylvan family (1537–1590). During this period Bouchout Castle fell into disrepair due to lack of maintenance. Moreover, the Spanish dominance of the Netherlands in the 16th century and the iconoclastic fury of 1566 further worsened its condition.

== First maps ==
The illustration of Jan Baptist Gramaye in his work Gallo-Brabantia is the oldest known illustration and reveals Bouchout Castle in the first decade of the 17th century. It was Christoffel d'Assonville (1528–1606) who bought the castle in 1590 from Joanna Transylvan and restored "Bocholdia Castrum" into its glorious medieval state. Major restorations were carried out including the transformation of the five original canals into one surrounding pond. Note the very long drawbridge which is also described in the 14th century. It may however have been drawn out of perspective since the bridge appears to be about twice as long as the Donjon Tower, which is about 20 metres (66 ft) high. The castle displays a rectangular structure with defensive towers at each corner including the Donjon which is still preserved today. The main building is at the back of the inner courtyard.

D'Assonville was one of the most loyal ministers during the Spanish period and he is believed to have been part of the assault on the Prince Wiliam of Orange in 1584.

In 1605, the Bouchout Domain was raised into a Barony enabling Christoffel d'Assonville to become a member of the Council of Brabant.

In 1626, Peter Verbist produced a detailed copper etching of the Duchy of Brabant. The Barony of Bouchout ("Bochout") can be found at a distance of about 11 kilometres (7 mi) to the north of Brussels (to the right at the map). This detailed map also displays Grimbergen (the former Berthout Castle) and Steinhussle, the territory of the related Diepensteyn Castle. The homeland of the founding fathers of Bouchout Castle is about 8 kilometres (5 mi) to the east of Brussels and includes the villages Crainhem, Sterbeeck and Nossegem.

Maps of Bouchout Castle
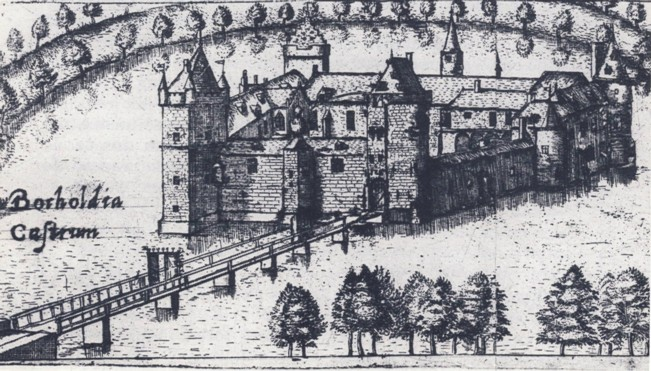
Bocholdia Castrum as published in the Gallo-Brabantia by J.B. Gramaye in 1606. This drawing displays the castle after it has been restored by Christoffel d'Assonville (1590–1600).

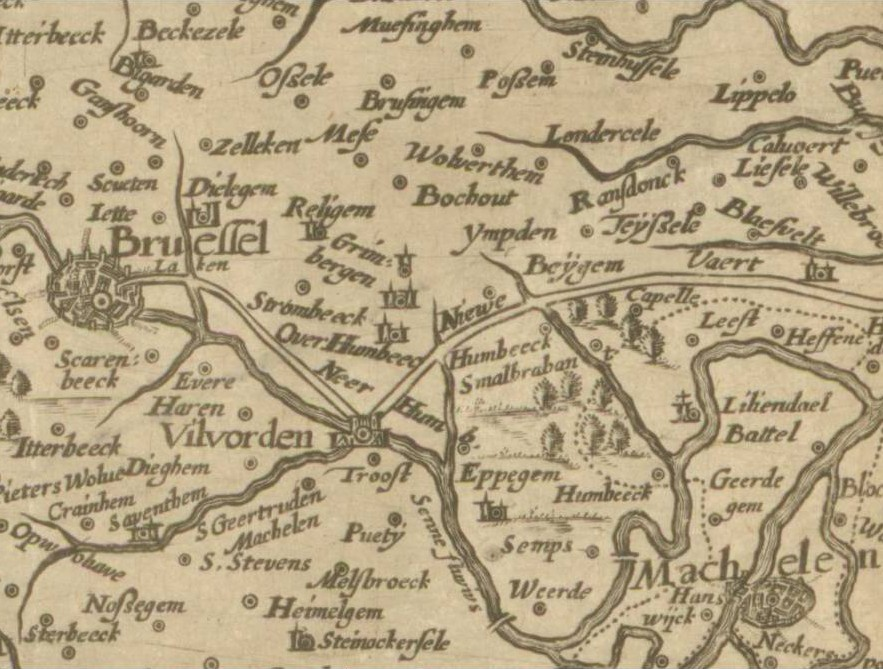
Detail from the Duchy of Brabant including the Bouchout Barony (Bochout). This copper etching was produced by Peter Verbist in 1628. The Bochout domain is 7 miles to the north of Brussels (to the right), while the homeland of the founding fathers, the Craaynhem family, is about 5 miles to the east (below).

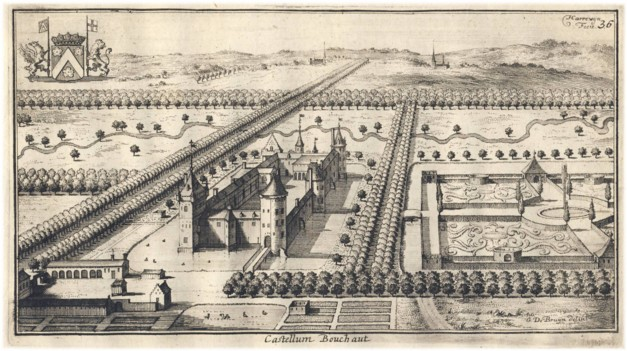
Castellum Bouchaut etching made by Jacobys Harrewijn in 1706. This copper etching displays Bouchout Castle after its "Renaissance makeover" by Peter-Ferdinand Roose at the end of the 17th century.

== Peter-Ferdinand Roose ==
Peter-Ferdinand Roose was born in Antwerp. He was the son of Jan-Karel Roose († 1641), the mayor of the city of Antwerp and Anna Fredericks van Bouckhorst, lady of Séclin. After his parents died, Peter-Ferdinand became the foster son of his uncle Peter Roose who was an important advisor of Filips IV, King of Spain. In this period, the Seven United Provinces of the Netherlands were at war with its suppressor Spain, which ended with a final separation at 1648 (Peace of Münster). During his career, Peter Roose acquired a number of domains including Froidmont, Jemeppe, Han and Granvelle. Since he did not have any direct heirs, his family including his foster son Peter Ferdinand were well taken care of. Peter-Ferdinand became a lawyer and acquired Bouchout Castle in 1673 from Renom de France since he had many debts. In France, this was the period of the Renaissance during which Louis XIV created the Palace of Versailles.

Also, Brussels developed into a fashionable capital where wigs and glamour for the happy few were common items. Peter-Ferdinand Roose transformed the medieval Castle into a Renaissance castle surrounded by French ornamental gardens. Most likely, Bouchout Castle was decorated with a wealth of paintings, classy furniture and closets full of books. You may notice that the drawbridge in the etching of Jacobus Harrewijn is more in proportion as compared to the drawing of Jan Baptist Gramaye (1606).

In 1700, Peter-Ferdinand died without any heirs and he joined the ornamental family grave at the chapel of the St.Goedekerk (Brussels) beside his uncle Peter Roose.

During the French Revolution and the subsequent domination of the Southern Netherlands (1797–1830), Bouchout Castle was partly destroyed. The wooden bridge was dismantled and used to warm the French soldiers during the severe winter of 1795, while that part of the pond was filled up to facilitate the entrance to the castle. Further, the complete enforcement at the front was destroyed and the castle was also looted by the soldiers. Clearly, Bouchout suffered a lot during the French dominance.

== Neo-Gothic style ==
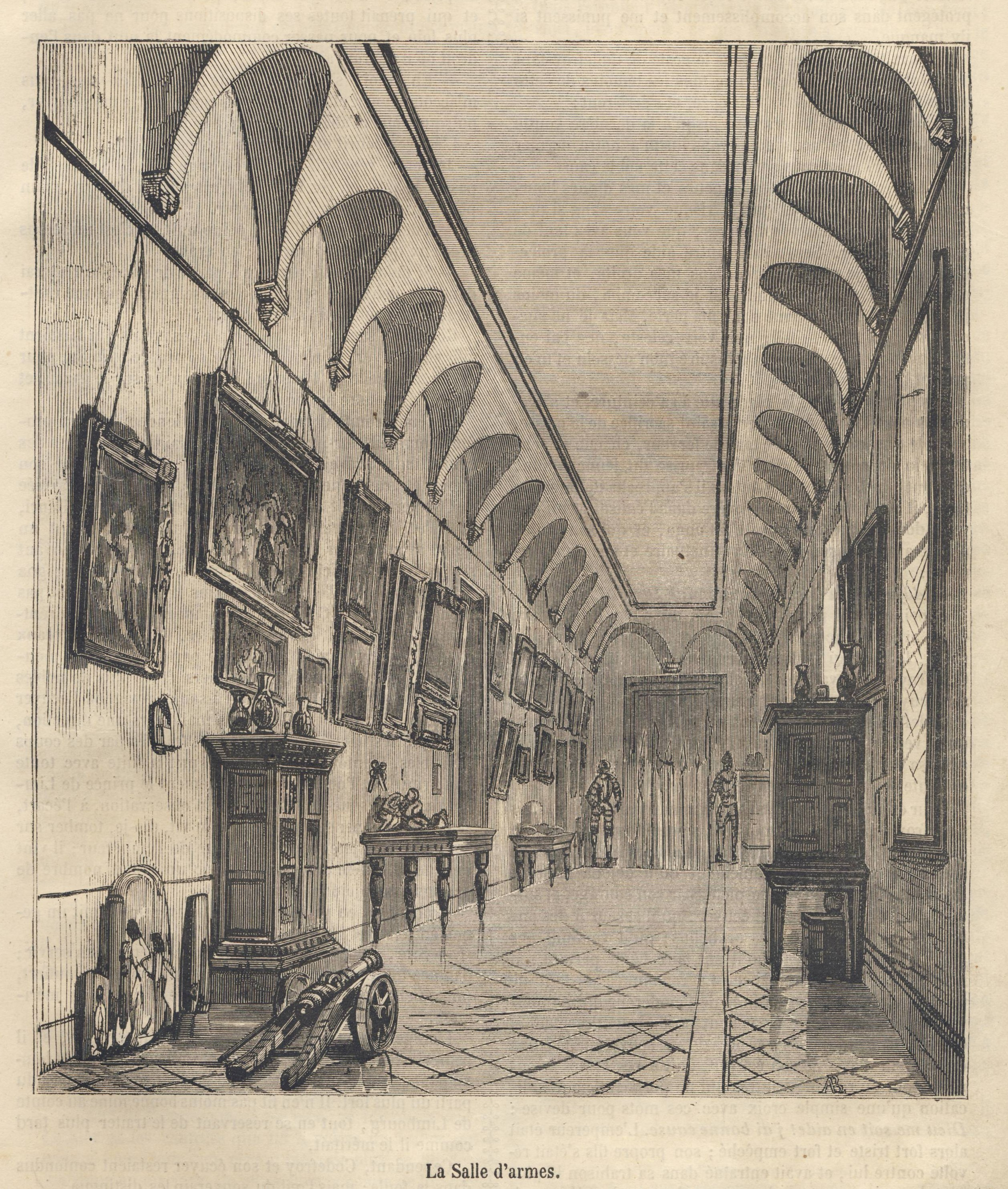
Salle d'armes of Bouchout Castle as published in Musée des Familles (1843). This Armoury Gallery was located at the first floor. Neo-Gothic elements include the canon, the old paintings and the suits of armour.

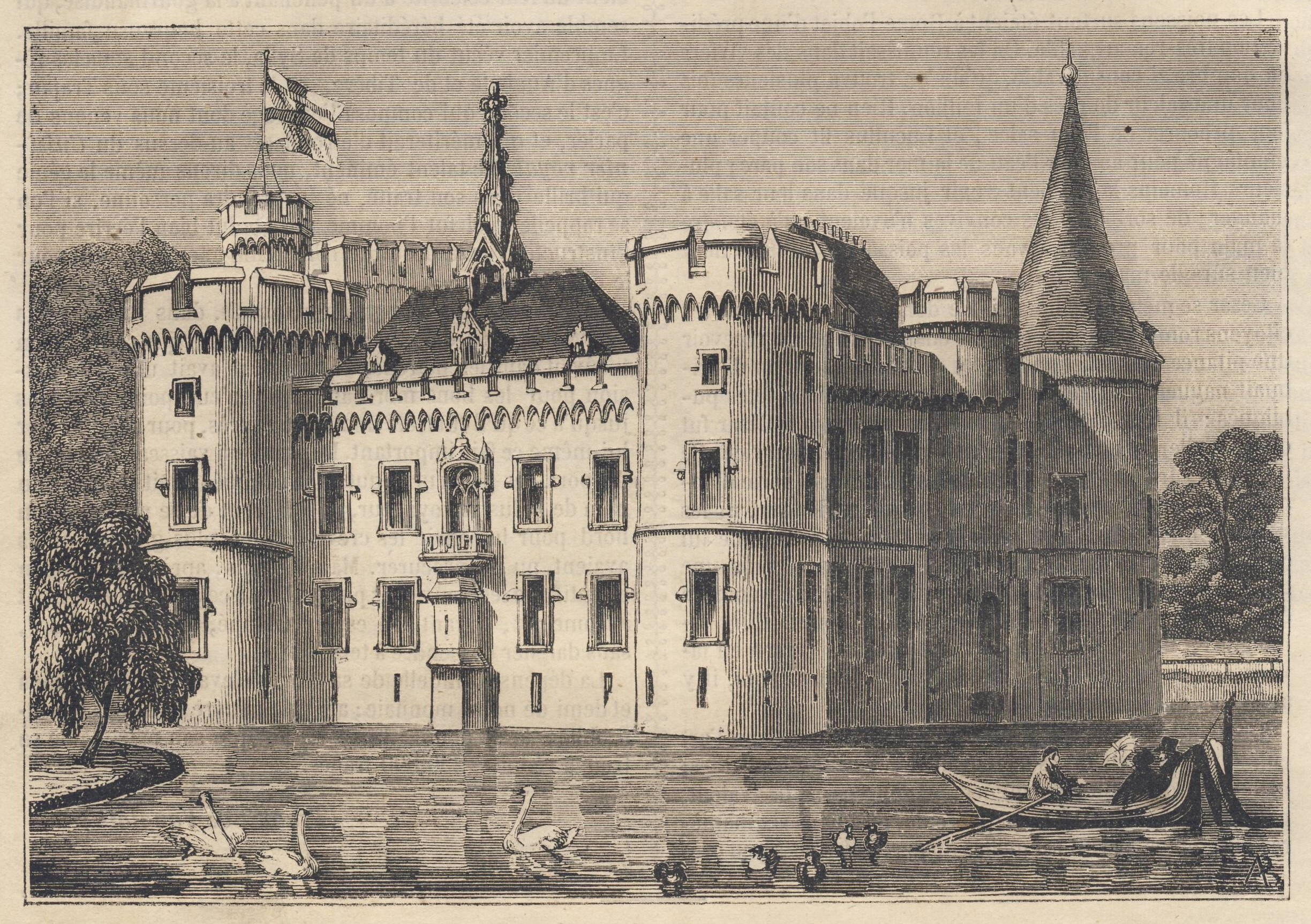
Bouchout Castle, north-east view, after the renovations of 1832 as performed by Amadeus de Beauffort.

=== 19th-century context ===
Since 1830, Belgium is an independent country and during the early years, it was keen to prove its right to exist. The young nation, therefore, referred a lot to the late Middle Ages, during which the Southern Netherlands played an important role in the development of Europe. The early neo-Gothic renovations of Bouchout Castle performed in 1832 by Count Amedeus de Beauffort should be placed in the latter context. This count of Bouchout was born in Doornik in 1806 and studied law in Paris. He married Elisabeth Roose de Baisy in 1830 and became director of fine arts in 1835.

Under the supervision of architect Tilman François Suys, Bouchout Castle underwent a medieval metamorphosis. The neo-Gothic renovations included, amongst others, demolishing the southern wing thereby rendering an open structure, modifying roof façades with Gothic battlements, introducing neo-Gothic windows, and adding further neo-Gothic details to enhance the medieval charisma of the castle. Also illustrative for this period, were the curious objects and old paintings the noble families tend to collect. A fine example is the Armoury Gallery (Salle d'armes) which was situated on the first floor of Bouchout Castle. In later years, the rooms adjacent to this gallery were removed and nowadays it is a conference room of 165 m^{2}. The renovated Bouchout Castle also harboured several neo-Renaissance elements such as the fireplace in the dining room and the ceilings of the Empress Room and White Room. After the death of Count Amedeus de Beauffort († 1858) and his wife Countess Elisabeth Roose-de Baisy († 1873), their son Leopold became the owner of Bouchout Castle. He did not marry and apparently lived in the Donjon Tower.

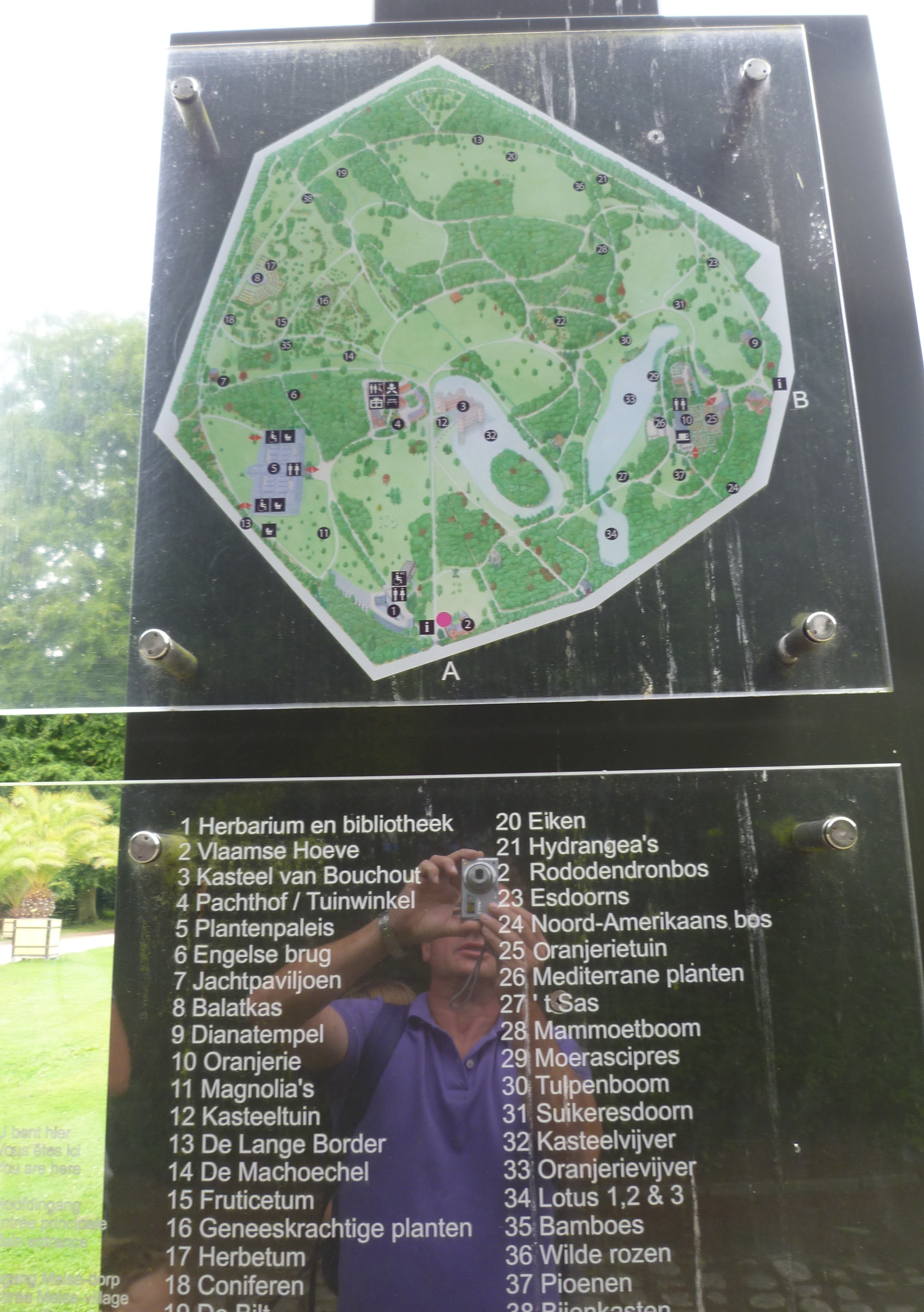
Public map of interesting sites at Meise Botanic Garden. Bouchout Castle (no. 3) is in the middle, adjacent to the pond ("Kasteelvijver", no. 32).

=== Residence of Empress Charlotte ===
In 1879, the Bouchout Domain was bought by the Belgian court and served as the residence for the King's sister, Charlotte, the dowager Empress of Mexico, known as Carlota of Mexico. She married Ferdinand Maximilian of Austria in 1857, who later became Emperor of Mexico in 1864 during the Second Mexican Empire. At the behest of Mexican monarchists (largely the Mexican nobility) and ambitions of Napoleon III, Mexico was occupied by France and reverted into a monarchical form of government, as it had been since its inception. However, after the Civil War in the United States had ended, the North Americans forced Napoleon III to withdraw his troops. This left Maximilian unprotected against the Mexican Republicans and, in spite of the many entreaties of his wife, he decided to stay. He was captured and executed in 1867.

Charlotte suffered a lot during this period, after which her mental condition was described as very weak. The Empress and her court were based in the castle, but she never took public engagements. Since Charlotte was the sister-in-law of Franz Joseph I of Austria, the domain was respected during World War I by the occupying German soldiers. This allowed the citizens of Meise to use the castle's domain as a place of refuge. The empress-dowager died in the castle on 19 January 1927.

=== Meise Botanic Garden ===
After Empress Charlotte died in 1927, most of the furnishings were transferred to the Palace of Laeken in Brussels. Fortunately, the domain which included Bouchout Castle and Meise Castle was bought by the Belgian state. Thereafter, part of the domain was developed into a botanic garden, which became public in 1958. In 1939, Belgian soldiers were billeted at Bouchout Castle and looted it in November 1939. During World War II, Bouchout Castle was occupied by German soldiers, who also built four fortified shelters at the domain. In November 1944, a first flying bomb struck the west side of the domain, causing most windows of Bouchout Castle to break. A second flying bomb struck Meise Castle, which burnt completely.

The condition of Bouchout Castle worsened again during the decades after World War II. In the 1960s plans were made for the restoration of the castle. The castle was finally restored between 1987 and 1989. Since then, it has served as a place for meetings, lectures and exhibitions, surrounded by the 92 hectares (230 acres) of Meise Botanic Garden.

Bouchout Castle (no. 3 at the map to the left) is somewhat below the centre of Meise Botanic Garden and can be easily reached from the main entrance. To the south of the castle, the Garden Shop (number 4) at the Tenant Farm displays a large number of botanical items and books related to the garden. Further to the southeast, a large complex of greenhouses (number 5) enables the visitors to travel through various climates such as the rainforest, the Mediterranean and drought-monsoon greenhouses. The large western part of the Bouchout Domain includes a field of large oaks (number 20), beehouses (number 38), wild roses (number 36) and maple trees (number 23). To the east of Bouchout Castle, the former Orangery (number 10) harbours a place to relax, drink and eat.

On 17 June 2010, Bouchout Castle hosted the former Prime Minister of the Netherlands. Jan-Peter Balkenende gave a farewell party for his European friends, including Angela Merkel, Chancellor of Germany.

== See also ==
- List of castles and châteaux in Belgium
