= Boekhout =

Boekhout is a family name of Dutch origin, examples include:

- Geert Boekhout (born 1958), Belgian swimmer
- Henze Boekhout (1947–2024), Dutch artist/photographer
- Louis Boekhout (1919–2012), painter born in the Netherlands who later immigrated to Québec Canada

== See also ==
- Boekhoute, a community in Belgian province of East-Flanders
- Boechout, a community in Belgian province of Antwerp
