= Tony De Pauw =

Belgian businessman

Tony De Pauw was a Belgian businessman. He was chief executive officer of WDP (Warehouses De Pauw NV) in Wolvertem with an estimated fortune of 95.2 million euro.

== Biography ==
Tony De Pauw was a son of Jos De Pauw, who founded Warehouses De Pauw in 1977 to manage the real estate of the Jos De Pauw family group. That same year, the real estate portfolio split between Jos De Pauw and his brother Pierre De Pauw, who founded logistics real estate company Montea. WDP went public in June 1999. Shortly after Jos De Pauw died, Tony De Pauw took over the management of the company, and from 2010 until his death on the 6th of August 2025 he was co-CEO together with Joost Uwents. He was married with Pascale De Keersmaeker, the daughter of the former Belgian Minister Paul De Keersmaeker.

In December 2022, he became a director of soccer club RSC Anderlecht. He was also a member of the strategic committee of the Federation of Belgian Enterprises and was a director of Le Concert Olympique.
