= Meise Botanic Garden =

Botanical garden in Belgium

- Plantentuin Meise (Dutch); Jardin botanique de Meise (French)
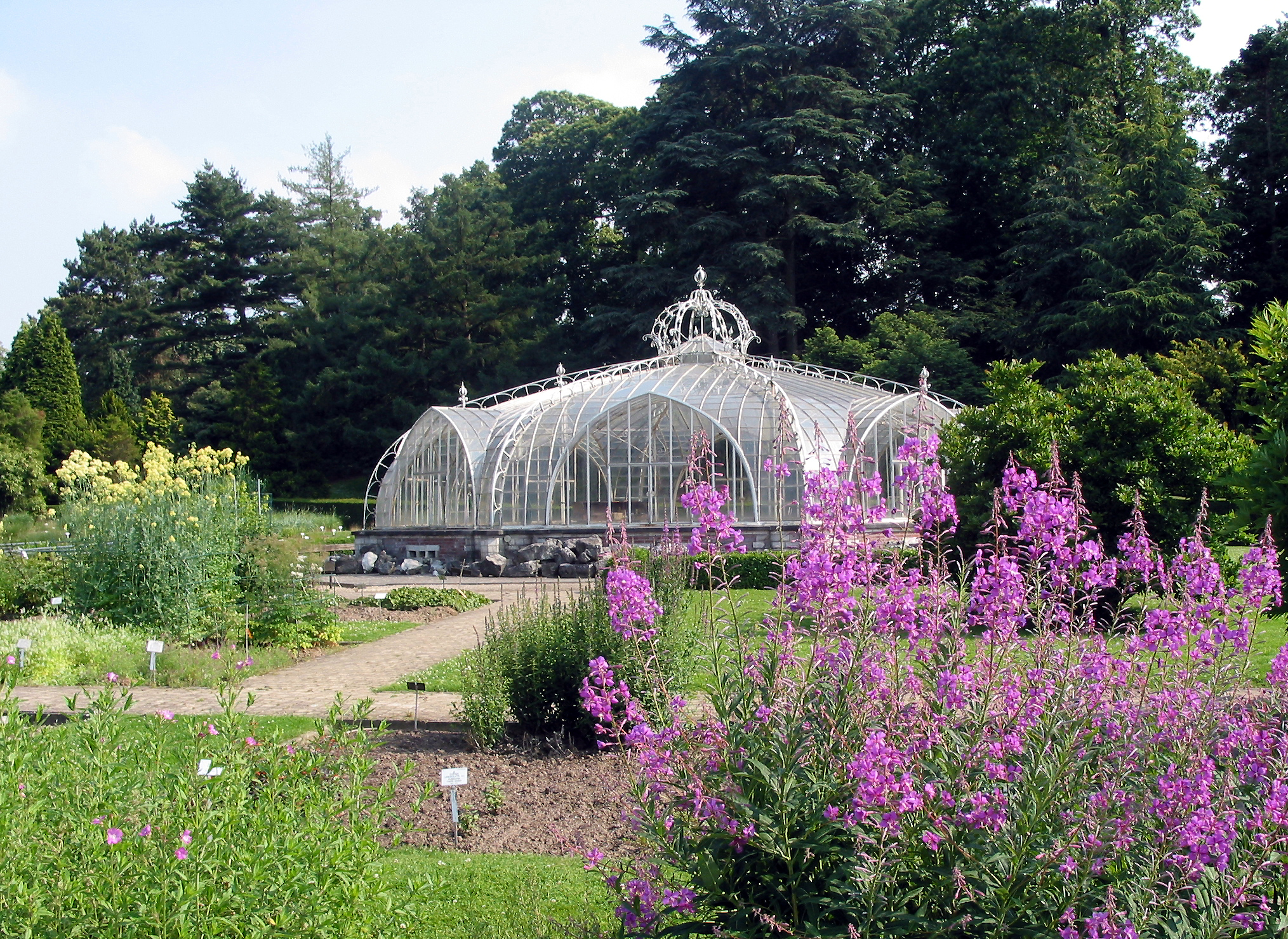
- Balat Greenhouse

- Location within Belgium
- Former name: National Botanic Garden of Belgium
- Established: 1840; 186 years ago
- Location: Nieuwelaan 38, Meise, Flemish Brabant, Belgium
- Coordinates: 50.928358°N 4.327383°E
- Director: Dr. Steven Dessein
- Owners: Flemish Community (since 2014); Belgian state (until 2013)
- Website: www.plantentuinmeise.be/en

Meise Botanic Garden (Dutch: Plantentuin Meise; French: Jardin botanique de Meise), until 2014 called the National Botanic Garden of Belgium (Dutch: Nationale Plantentuin van België; French: Jardin botanique national de Belgique), is a botanical garden located in the grounds of Bouchout Castle in Meise, Flemish Brabant, just north of Brussels. It is one of the world's largest botanical gardens, with an extensive collection of living plants and a herbarium of about 4 million specimens. The current garden was established in 1958 after moving from central Brussels; the former site is now the Botanical Garden of Brussels.

Meise Botanic Garden contains about 18,000 plant species — about 6% of all the world's known plant species. Half are in greenhouses, the other half, including cultivated and indigenous plants, are outdoors. The Index Herbariorum code assigned to this botanic garden is BR, which is used when citing housed specimens. The botanic garden's mission statement specifies increasing and spreading "the knowledge of plants" and contributions to "the conservation of biodiversity". Research at the garden is primarily conducted on Belgian and African biodiversity (including plants, fungi, myxomycetes, and diatoms).

Meise Botanic Garden was property of the Belgian government, but after several years of negotiations, it was eventually transferred to the Flemish Community effective 1 January 2014. The French Community still has its own employees and representation in the board of directors. The plants, library, etc. remain property of the state, but are given as commodate to the Flemish Community.

== History ==
=== Establishment in Brussels ===
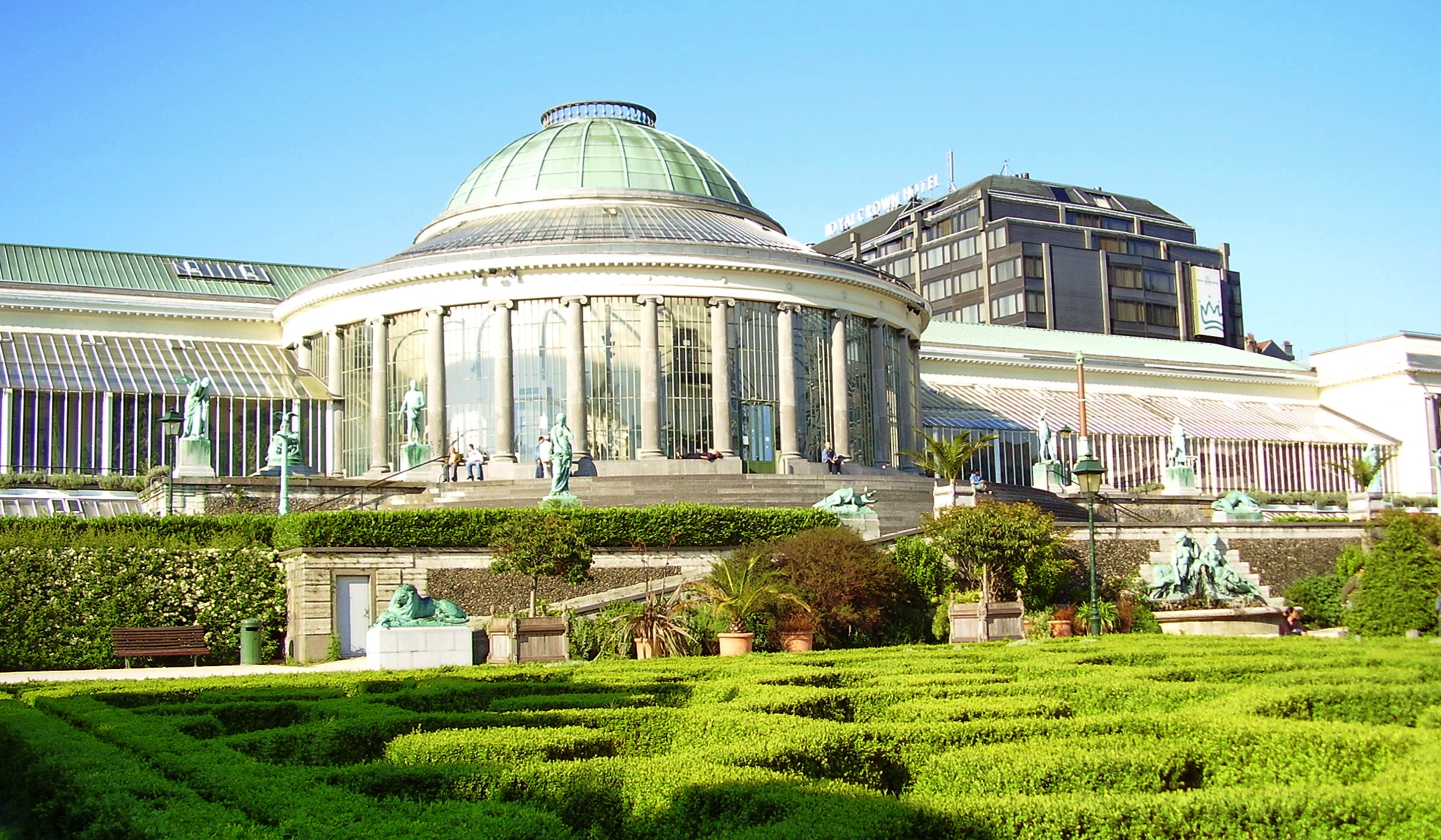
Le Botanique in Brussels was the main orangery of the National Botanic Garden of Belgium

The first botanical garden in Brussels belonged to the École Centrale of the department of the Dyle that was created during the French rule of Belgium at the end of the 18th century. Due to their costs, those French schools were soon dropped and some municipalities, including the City of Brussels, took over the garden that was about to be abandoned. In 1815, Belgium became part of the United Kingdom of the Netherlands. Around the same period, the maintenance costs of the garden were regarded as too high by the city administration. In 1826, a group of local bourgeois decided to create a new kind of botanical garden in Brussels. At the time the bourgeoisie was the new leading-class, and since companies were a popular financing method, the garden was created as a company. The creators thought it would be their contribution to the city's reputation. Although it was rooted on a private enterprise, it was also intended to be a national institution dedicated to science and botanical studies.

Both the City of Brussels and the Home Office supported the Botanical Garden financially. However, the independence of Belgium (1830–31) was detrimental to the Dutch-born institution; it was regarded as orangist, as a mere playground for the local elites, and as not useful for the country's agriculture, among other critiques. From then on, the garden would have to battle to survive. The state and the city did not want to support it anymore unless it proved useful to the whole country, so the Botanical Garden was obliged to develop its commercial activities. It sold plants by the thousands, and created several money-consuming attractions and events for the local elite, like aquaria, a dance room, fairs, a fish nursery, concerts etc. In the 1860s, the aging buildings required renovation. The board of the Society of Horticulture tried to raise the money, but the costs were just too high for the company. In 1870, the Belgian government took over the company. The National Botanic Garden was created in the very same year. Barthélemy Dumortier, a Belgian politician and botanist, had played a major role in this process. He wanted a "Belgian Kew" to be created in the capital, that is to say a botanical garden dedicated to taxonomy. That is why, some months before the garden was bought by the state, the government had purchased the famous Von Martius Herbarium that was held in Munich. So, in 1870, Belgium had a great herbarium and an appropriate building. This marked the dawn of a new era for Belgian botany.

=== Move to Meise ===
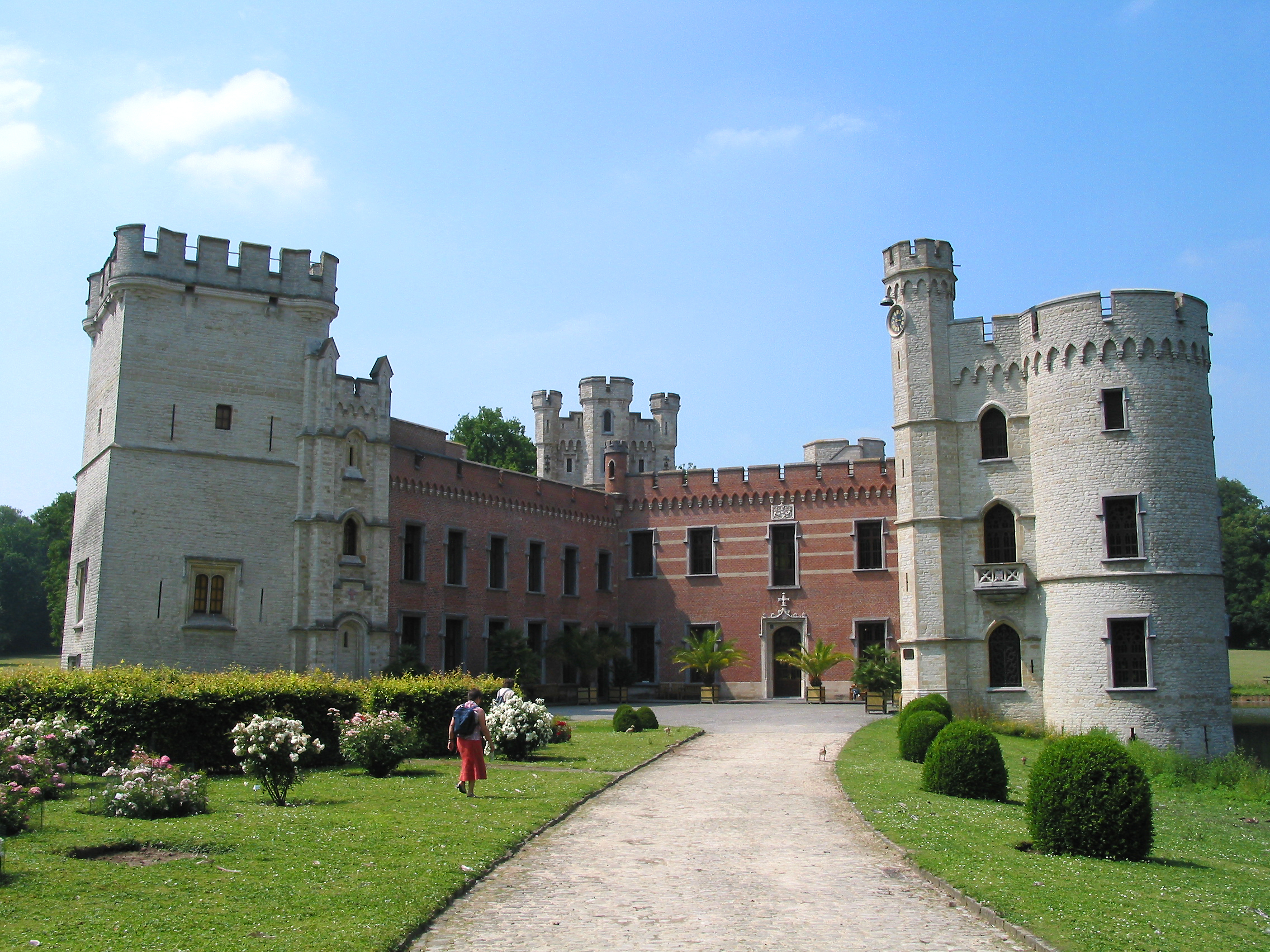
Bouchout Castle in Meise

In 1927, just after the death of Empress Charlotte, it was proposed to set up the National Botanical Garden at the Bouchout Domain. It took until 1937 before the final decision was made and major constructions were started. To the south-east of Bouchout Castle, the "Palace of Plants" was built, which consists of a number of greenhouses. Further to the south-west of the castle, the Victorian Balat Greenhouse was placed. This greenhouse was designed in 1853 by the architect Alphonse Balat and transported from its original location at the Botanical Garden of Brussels.

During the Second World War, Bouchout Castle was occupied by the German forces and the domain was altered into a fortress. Next to the Palace of Plants, six barracks were placed and concrete defences were erected. The court of honour of Bouchout Castle was used to store ammunition, while artillery defences were placed at the borders of the domain. The last German soldiers left the Bouchout Domain on 3 September 1944. Just a few days later, the Allied Forces arrived; they used it as a training location, while stationing about 200 vehicles at the domain. On 29 November 1944, a bomb exploded at the western part of the park, destroying the windows of Bouchout Castle. A second bomb exploded on 2 December at the nearby Hoogvorst Castle, causing its complete destruction.

Among the garden's oldest specimens is an Eastern Cape giant cycad (Encephalartos altensteinii), estimated to be around 300 years old, which was originally brought to Europe as ship ballast. As part of a broader layout modernisation to address future scientific challenges, the dilapidated 20th-century greenhouse housing the historic cycad is scheduled for demolition, though the tree itself will be preserved in situ.

== Gallery ==
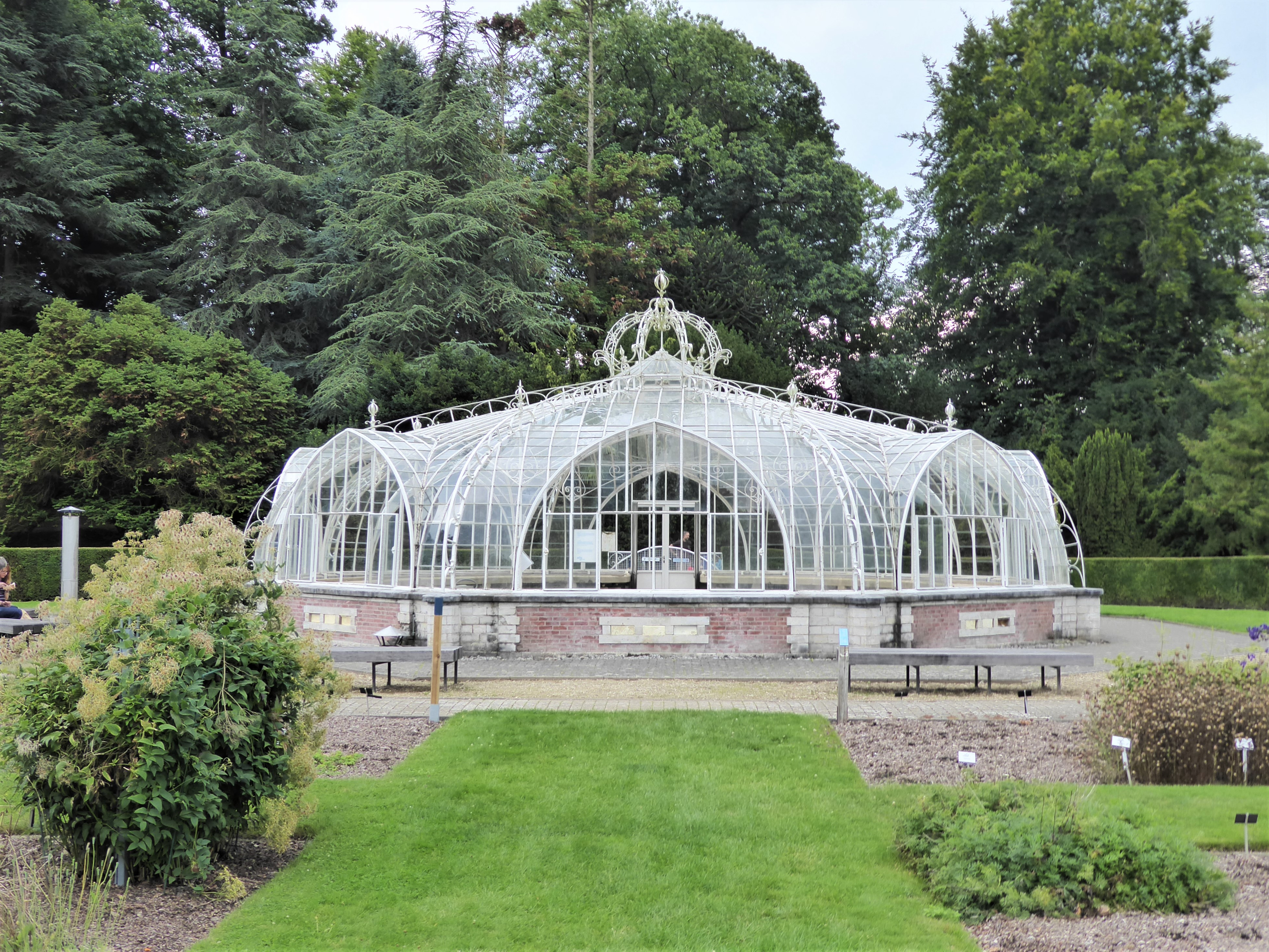
Balat Greenhouse

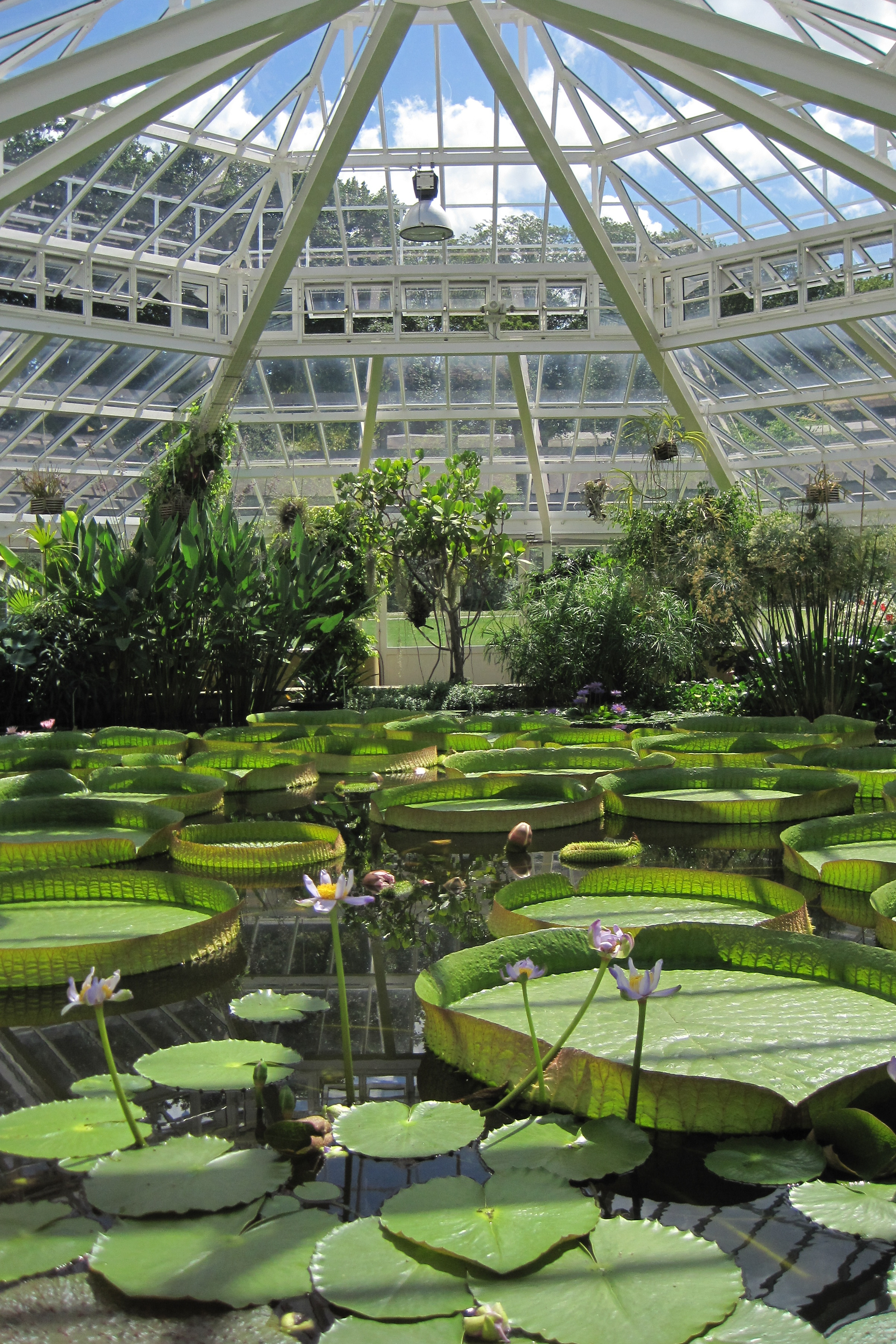
Giant waterlilies in the Victoria Greenhouse

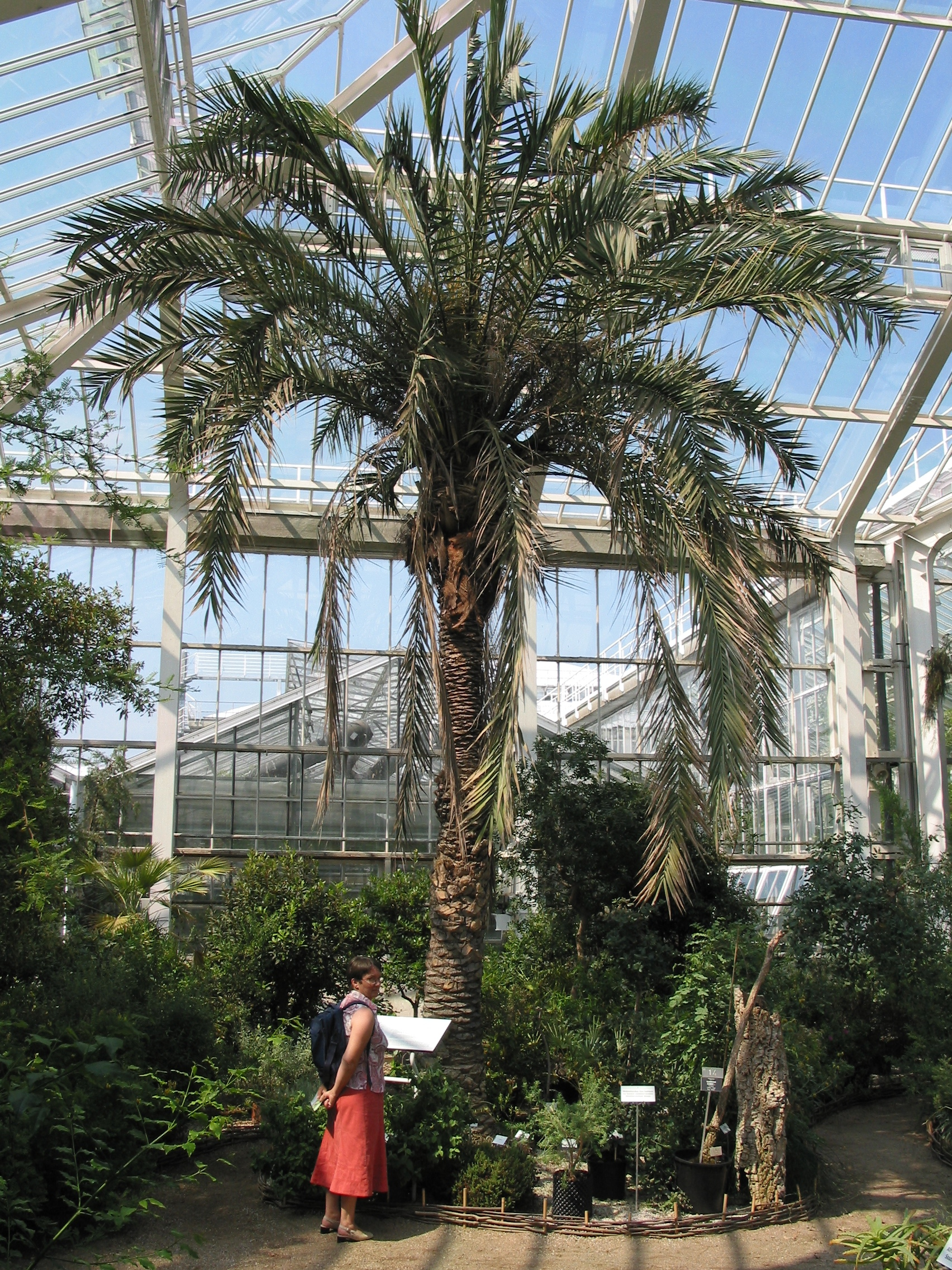
Palace of Plants

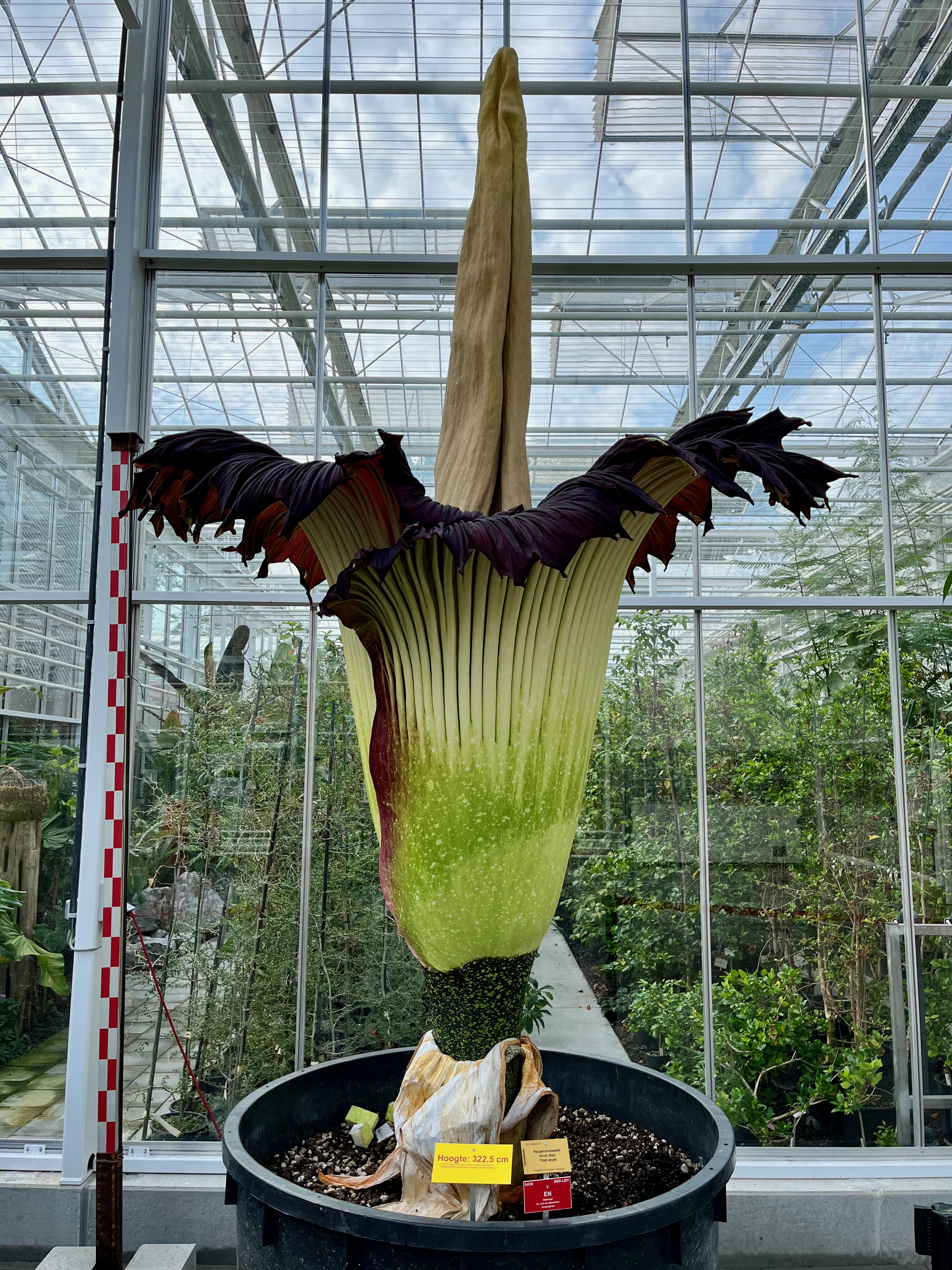
Amorphophallus titanum

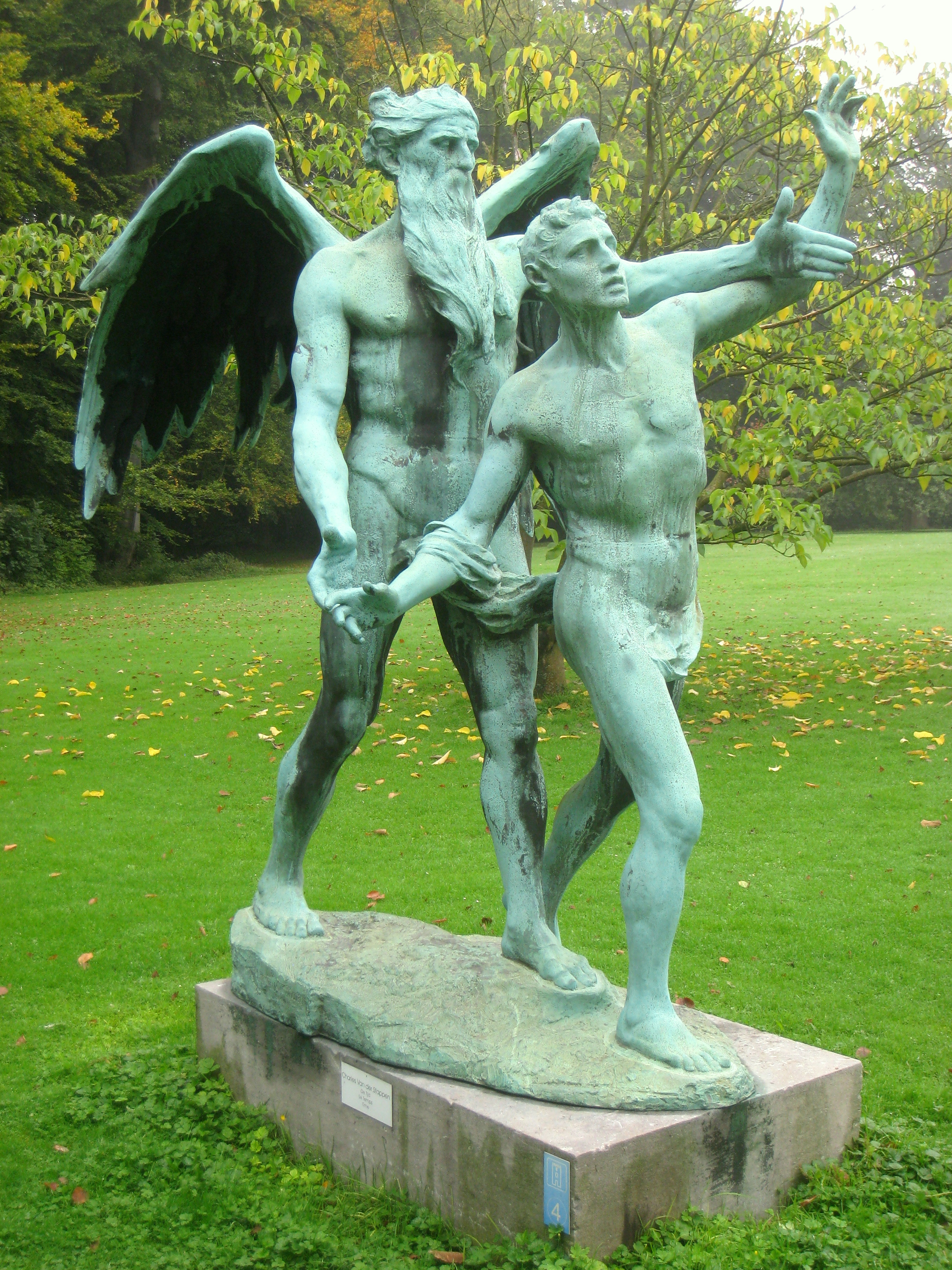
Time by Charles van der Stappen

== See also ==
- Botanic Gardens Conservation International
- List of herbaria in Europe
- List of botanical gardens in Belgium
- Belgian Federal Science Policy Office
