= Henze Boekhout =

Dutch artist and photographer (1947–2024)

- Born: 2 February 1947; Haarlem, Netherlands
- Died: 30 November 2024 (aged 77)
- Occupations: Artist, photographer

Henze Boekhout (Haarlem, 2 February 1947 – Haarlem, 30 November 2024) was a Dutch artist and photographer who lived and worked in Haarlem. He was self-taught. Boekhout died in 2024, at the age of 77.

== Collections ==
His work is included in the collections of:

- the Stedelijk Museum, Amsterdam
- Huis Marseille, Amsterdam,
- the New York Public Library/ Spencer Collection, and
- the Fotomuseum, Rotterdam.
