= Wolvertem =

- Village and former municipality
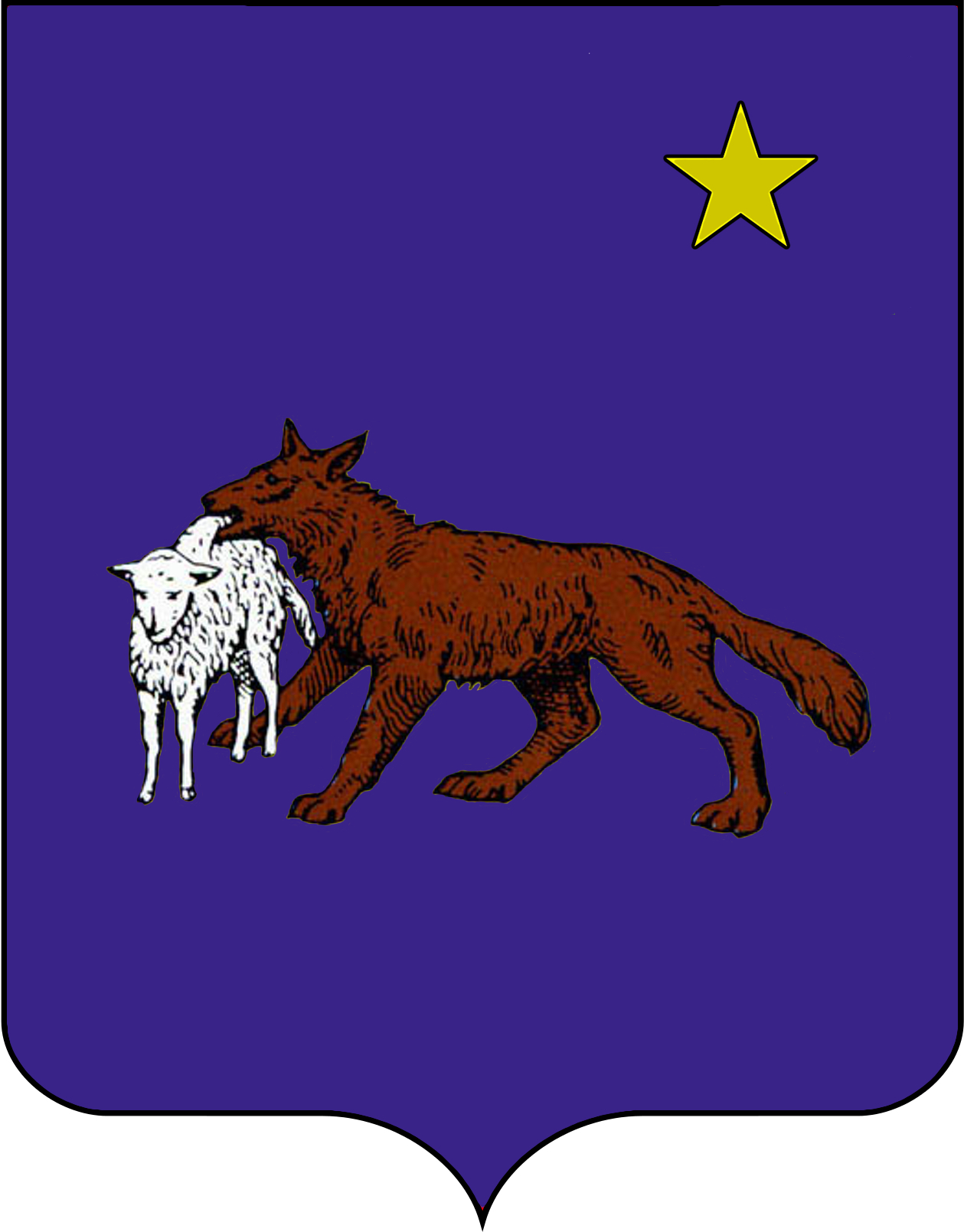
- Coat of arms
- Interactive map of Wolvertem
- Coordinates: 50°57′01″N 4°18′32″E
- Country: Belgium
- Region: Flanders
- Province: Flemish Brabant
- Municipality: Meise

Area
  - Total: 20.60 km^{2} (7.95 sq mi)

Population (1 January 2025)
  - Total: 8,726
  - Density: 424/km^{2} (1,100/sq mi)
- Postal code: 1861

Wolvertem is a village in the province of Flemish Brabant, Belgium, and a sub-municipality of Meise. It is located north of the town of Meise and was an independent municipality until the municipal reorganization of 1977.

== Etymology ==
The earliest known mention of Wolvertem dates to 1086, where it appears as Vulvrethem in a document related to the Dieleghem Abbey. The name is believed to derive from the Frankish personal name “Wolfhart” combined with the suffix “-heim,” meaning “home” or “settlement,” thus signifying “home of Wolfhart.”

== History ==
=== Early history ===
Archaeological finds indicate human presence in the Wolvertem area since prehistoric times. A polished flint axe from the Neolithic period was discovered in 1874 and is now preserved in the Art & History Museum in Brussels.

=== Middle Ages ===
During the early Middle Ages, the area formed part of the Pagus of Brabant within Lotharingia. Wolvertem later became part of the Duchy of Brabant in 1183.

=== Early modern period ===
In 1669, a major outbreak of the plague killed approximately 300 inhabitants of Wolvertem. During the reign of Louis XIV of France, the region also suffered from military incursions and looting. In the 18th century, under Austrian rule, the population grew significantly. Wolvertem became an official municipality toward the end of the Ancien Régime.

=== 19th and 20th centuries ===
In 1811, the neighboring municipalities of Meuzegem and Rossem were merged into Wolvertem. The village remained largely rural, although connectivity improved with the introduction of a tram line to Brussels in 1894.

During World War I, many inhabitants were forced to work in Germany, while others served in the Belgian Army. Several local soldiers were killed or wounded. In World War II, fewer military casualties were recorded among soldiers from Wolvertem, but civilian casualties occurred due to deportations and bombings.

In August 1942, the castle of Neromhof was converted into a maternity home as part of the Lebensborn program, a Nazi initiative aimed at increasing birth rates according to racial ideology. The facility ceased operations after the opening of a larger center in Wégimont in 1943, and only a limited number of children were born there.

Wolvertem remained an independent municipality until 1976, when it was merged into Meise as part of a nationwide municipal reorganization.

== Geography ==
Wolvertem includes several smaller settlements, including Meuzegem, Rossem, Imde, and Westrode. The hamlets of Nerom and Slozen are also located within its boundaries. Nearby localities include Merchtem, Oppem, and Sint-Brixius-Rode.

The area lies at an elevation of approximately 30 meters above sea level. The Meuzegemse Beek and the Kleine Molenbeek flow through the region. Due to its proximity to Brussels, Wolvertem has experienced some suburbanization, though it retains a largely rural character.

== Landmarks ==
- The Sint-Laurentiuskerk dates back to the 13th century and features a Romanesque baptismal font and Baroque furnishings.
- The former town hall, built in 1875 in Flemish style.
- The rectory dating from 1660, now used by the local public welfare center.

== Notable people ==
- Jan Frans Stallaert (1751–1828), poet
- Ann Christy (1945–1984), singer
- Frank Deboosere (born 1958), meteorologist
- Jo Vally (born 1958), singer
- Kris Wauters (born 1964), musician
