= Boekhoute =

Village in Belgium

Coordinates: 51°15′31″N 3°43′05″E

Location of Boekhoute

Coat of arms of Boekhoute

Boekhoute is a village in the Belgian province of East Flanders and is a submunicipality of Assenede. It was an independent municipality until the municipal reorganization of 1977. Boekhoute is located near the border with the Netherlands, in the Meetjesland. The northwestern part of the village is located in the Laurijnepolder.
