= Den Botaniek =

Botanic Garden of Antwerp, created 1825

Coordinates: 51°12′51″N 4°24′22″E

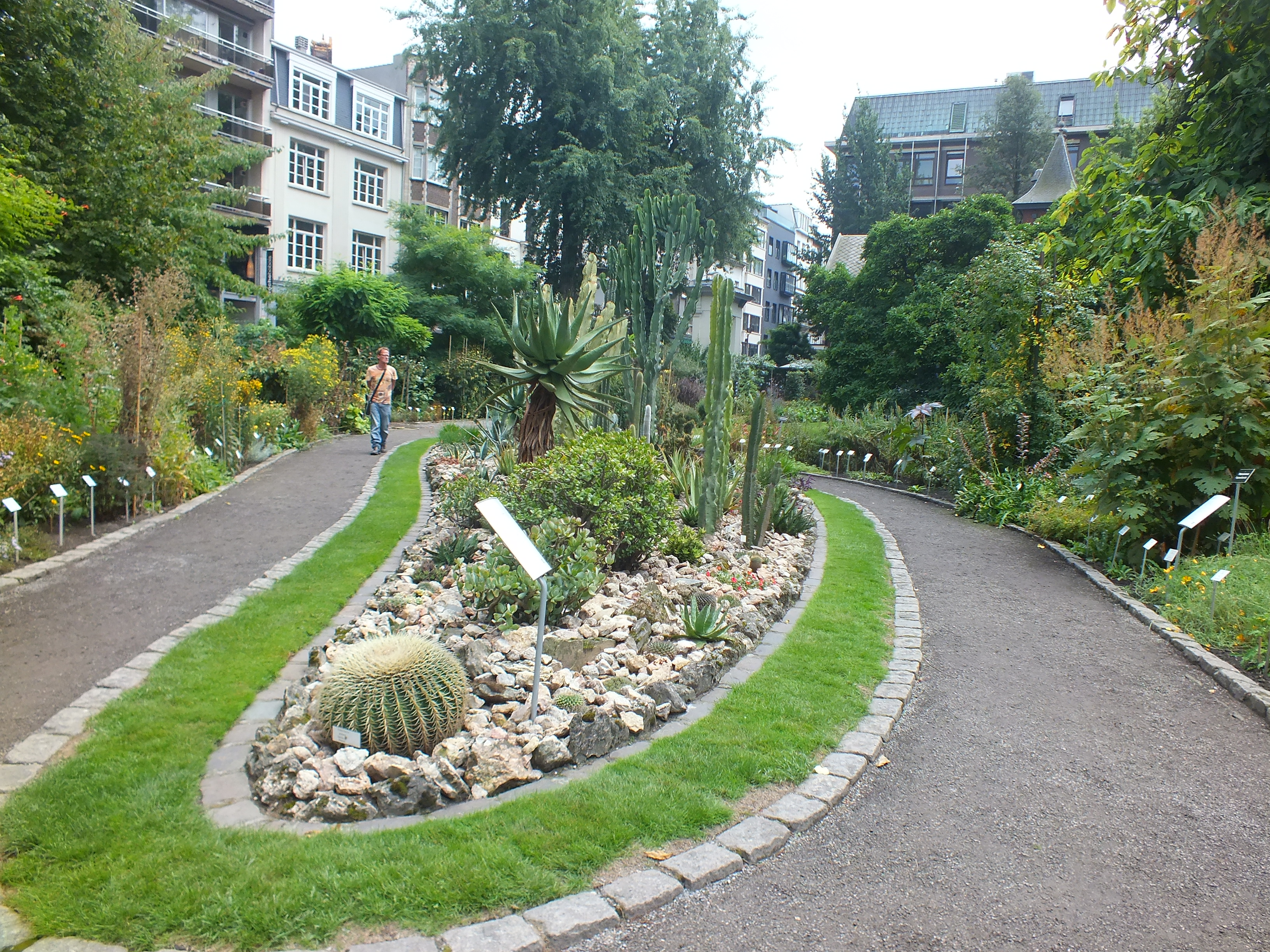

The Botanic Garden of Antwerp, which also carries the name Den Botaniek (also sometimes locally called Den Botanieken Hof or Kruidtuin), is a landscaped botanical garden created in 1825 in the inner city of Antwerp located at the Leopoldstraat, covering an area of slightly less than 1 hectare. Before that the park was, at the end of the 18th century, a plant garden for the Ecole Centrale and then the herb garden and later the vegetable garden of the Sint-Elisabethgasthuis in Antwerp.

The Garden in its present form was laid out by dokter Claude-Louis Sommé and supported the lessons in external pathology at the école de médecine, an education in medicine. The gardeners home in the park dates back to 1870 and the entrance gate, designed by Pierre Bruno Bourla to 1826. Burla also designed the Orangerie of the garden which is however no longer situated within the current area of the garden. The Orangerie contains busts of Linnaeus and de Jussieu and the names of De L'Escluse, De L'Obel, Van Sterbeeck, Dodoens and Dumortier on the facade.

The garden is managed by the City Council of Antwerp since 1926.

Since January 1950 the herb garden is a protected landscape. The garden holds a collection of 2,000 plants, with in the Conservatory some cacti and other exotic plants. The garden is open daily, but the Conservatory remains closed on Sundays. Entrance is free.
