= Meise =

- Municipality
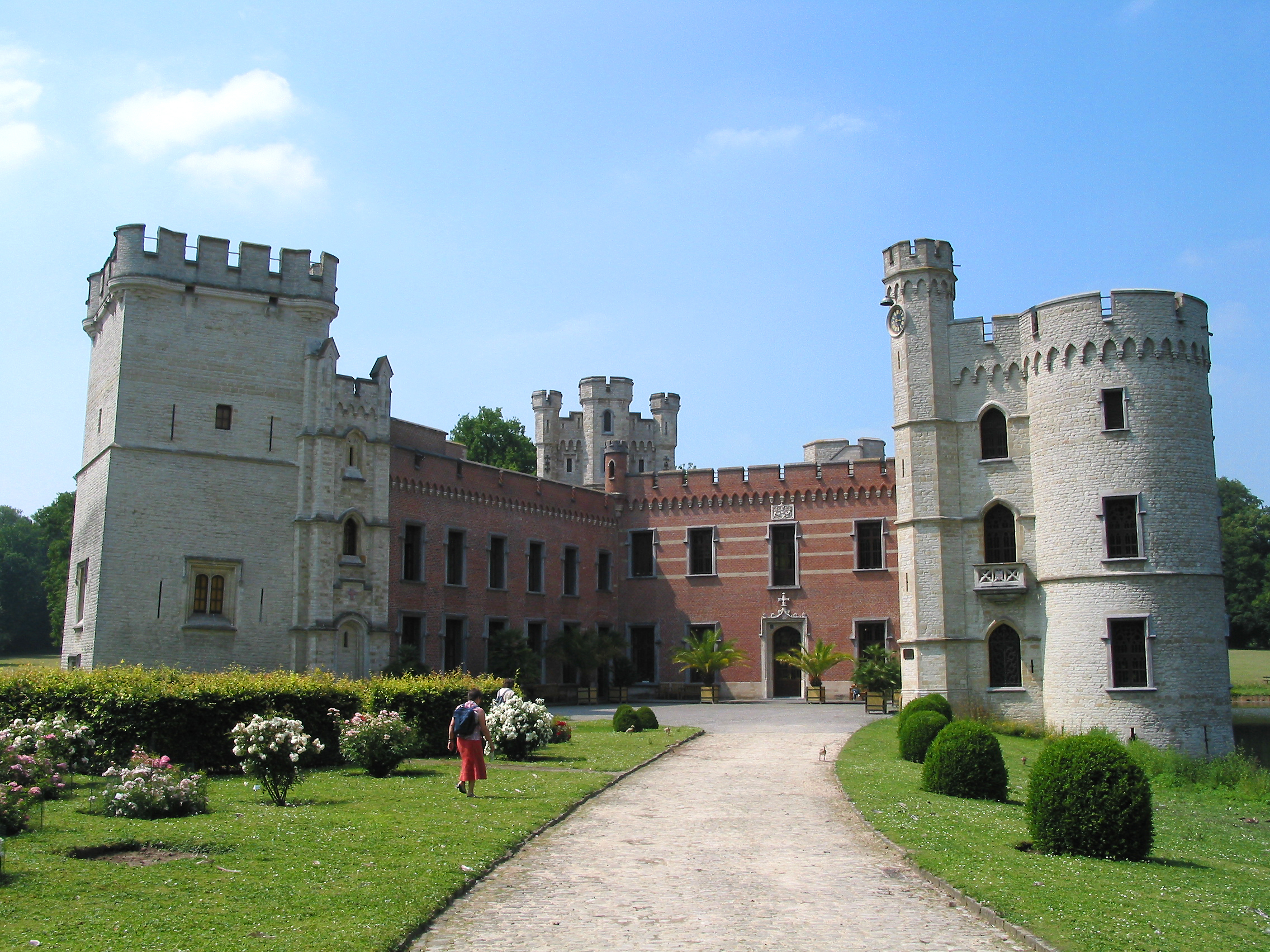
- Bouchout Castle

- Flag Coat of arms

- Location of Meise in Flemish Brabant
- Interactive map of Meise
- Location in Belgium
- Coordinates: 50°56′N 04°20′E
- Country: Belgium
- Community: Flemish Community
- Region: Flemish Region
- Province: Flemish Brabant
- Arrondissement: Halle-Vilvoorde

Government
  - Mayor: Gerda Van den Brande (N-VA)
  - Governing parties: N-VA, Samen Anders, PRO

Area
  - Total: 35.07 km^{2} (13.54 sq mi)

Population (2018-01-01)
  - Total: 19,164
  - Density: 546.4/km^{2} (1,415/sq mi)
- Postal codes: 1860, 1861
- NIS code: 23050
- Area codes: 02, 052, 015
- Website: www.meise.be

Meise (Dutch pronunciation: [ˈmɛisə]) is a municipality in the province of Flemish Brabant, in the Flemish region of Belgium. The municipality comprises the towns of Meise proper and Wolvertem (a deelgemeente), and several smaller villages like Sint-Brixius-Rode, Oppem, Meusegem, Impde/Imde, Rossem, Westrode and quarters as Bouchout, Nerom and Slozen. On January 1, 2006, Meise had a total population of 18,464. The total area is 34.82 km^{2} (13.44 sq mi), which gives a population density of 530/km^{2} (1,400/sq mi).

== Transport ==
The A12 runs vertically through the middle of Meise.

== Points of interest ==
- Wolvertem transmitter, a facility for AM broadcasting
- Bouchout Castle
- The wood chapel or in Dutch: 'Boskapel' surrounded by oaks

== Parks ==
- Meise Botanic Garden
- Park 'Neromhof'
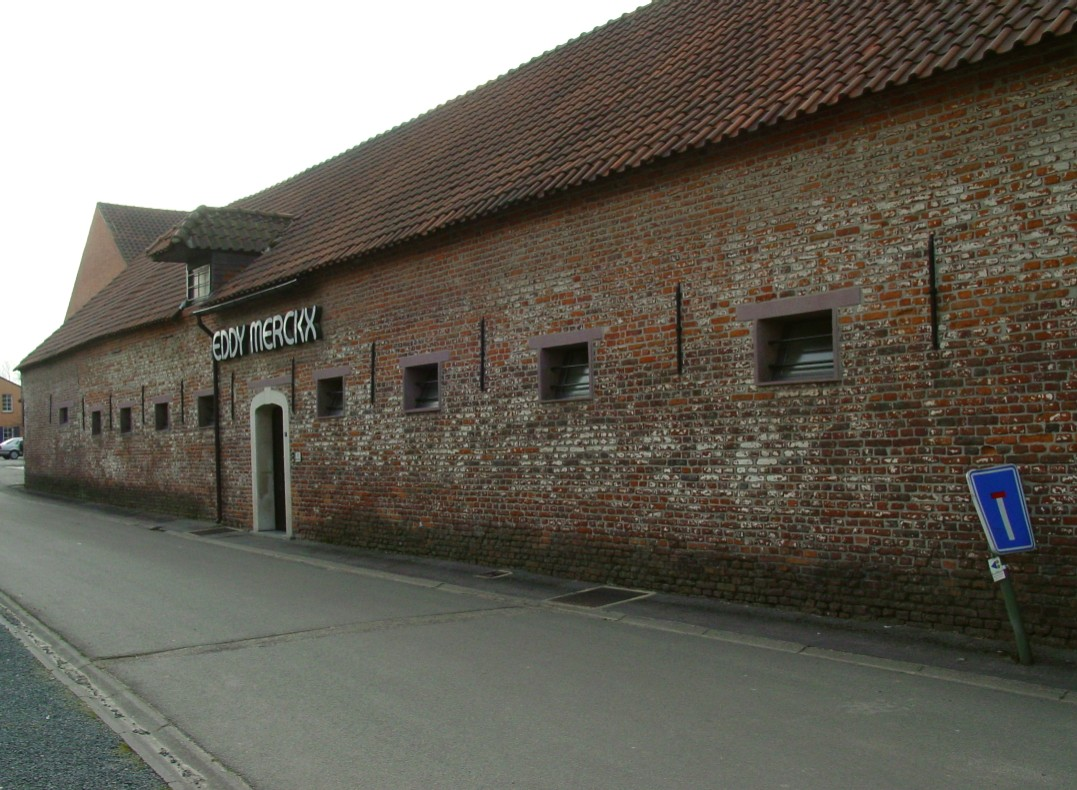
Eddy Merckx bicycle factory

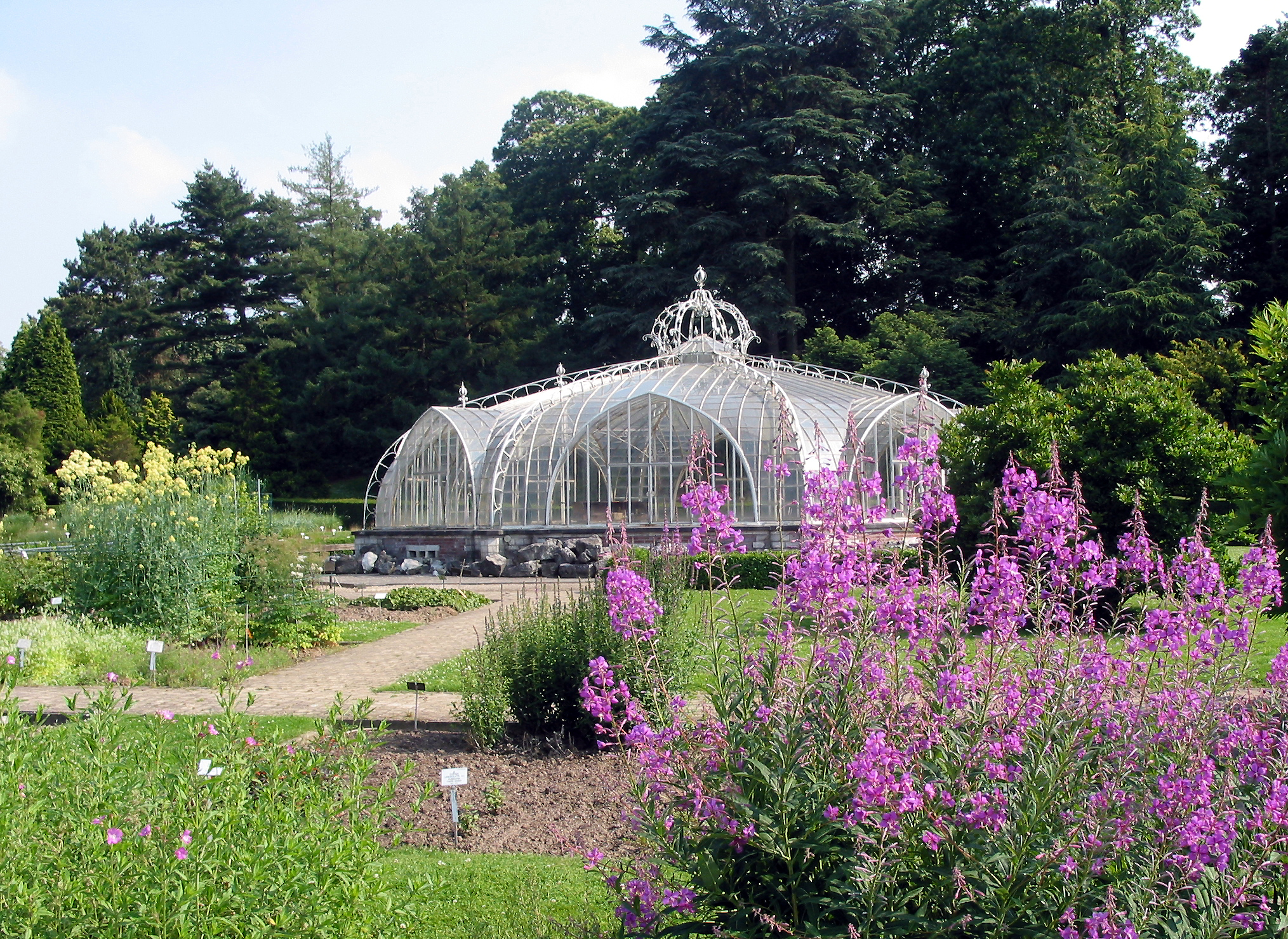
Meise Botanic Garden

== Nature ==
- The meadows of Wolvertem or in Dutch 'Wolvertemse beemden'
- The meadows of the 'Babbelbeek' or in Dutch 'Babbelbeekse beemden'
- The wood of Velaert or in Dutch 'Velaertbos'
- The small wood around the wood chapel or 'Boskapel'
- The wood of four oaks or in Dutch: 'vier eiken bos'

== Notable people ==
Some of Meise's most famous inhabitants are:

- Eddy Merckx
- Frank Deboosere
- Tony De Pauw
- Kris Wauters (from the band Clouseau)
- Jean-Pierre Van Rossem

Empress Carlota of Mexico (born the first Belgian princess) spent many secluded years at Bouchout Castle, where she died in 1927.

== Twin towns ==
- (Netherlands) Waalre, since 1980
