= Dutch Mexicans =

Dutch Descent resident in Mexico

Neerlandeses-mexicanos Nederlandse Mexicanen

Total population
- Mexican residents born in the Netherlands: 1,221 (2020) Dutch immigrants in Mexico: 1,509 (2009)

Regions with significant populations
- Mexico City, Quintana Roo, Jalisco, State of Mexico, Querétaro

Languages
- Spanish, Dutch

Religion
- Roman Catholicism, Protestantism

Related ethnic groups
- Dutch people, Flemings

Dutch Mexicans (Spanish: Neerlandeses-mexicanos; Dutch: Nederlandse Mexicanen) are Mexican citizens of Dutch descent.

== The concept and the numbers ==
Mexican citizens of Dutch descent who identify themselves as such would be considered Dutch Mexicans. It is not a category that INEGI measures in its Population Census so the number is unknown. The concept is related to two other, partially overlapping, concepts namely Dutch immigrants to Mexico and residents of Mexico born in the Netherlands. The number of Dutch immigrants to Mexico is measured through immigration statistics and totalled 1,509 living persons in 2009. The Population Census asks for the place of birth of a person. In 2020 there were 1,221 residents of Mexico who were born in the Netherlands.

== History ==
People from what is now the Netherlands emigrated to Mexico as early as the 16th century. One of the first may have been Enrico Martinez who was a Spanish-Dutch interpreter in the trial of Simon Pereyns. In the early 17th century, Dutch military engineer Adriaan Boot designed the Fort of San Diego in Acapulco to defend it from attacks by his countryman Joris van Spilbergen, among others.

The Porfiriato, because of its political stability and its growing financial credibility, and the incipient Dutch industrialization spurred investments and trade. The Netherlands sent diplomats to Mexico to conclude new treaties that were signed between 1899 and 1909, but relations with the nation continued to be dispatched from the Dutch legation in Washington. Muller (1905) and De Veer (1910) tell that some Dutch started tobacco and coffee plantations in Mexico, but Dutch immigration was generally scant, although the Mexican government was interested in attracting good farmers and dairy farmers to Mexico and made it clear that there was room for Javanese workers on the sugar and cocoa plantations. The Dutch Association in Mexico was created in 1907 with 18 people in attendance. Dutch trade in Mexico was carried out mainly from the port of Rotterdam and reflected the increasing modernization of industry and the Mexican railway. The Netherlands exports, for example, rails, coal and coke. But the total Dutch export to Mexico was less than half a million guilders a year.

=== Royal Dutch Shell ===
In 1910, the Netherlands was number five in the list of countries of origin of foreign investments in Mexico, after the United States and the three great European powers. At that time, the Holland-Mexico Mortgage Credit Society and the Dutch Transatlantic Commercial Association existed in Mexico City. It was not surprising that the small Dutch colony in Mexico City, still dependent on the Netherlands Legation in Washington: four days by train - insisted several times after 1900 on a diplomatic representation in Mexico, because Belgium already had it for years. The first Dutch ambassador, based in Washington D.C., to visit Mexico was John Loudon in 1910 on occasion of the 100 year independence of Mexico and the 80th birthday of its President. Mr. Loudon was the brother of Hugo Loudon, one of the founders of the Royal Dutch Petroleum Company that merged in 1907 into Shell plc. In 1919, Shell took control of Mexican Eagle Petroleum Company. In the 1920s, the Dutch community in Mexico of a few hundred souls consisted mostly of staff of this company. Some of them stayed in Mexico and had descendants. Actresses Ariadne Welter and Linda Christian were daughters of a Dutch staff member of Shell.

=== Mennonites ===
The first group of immigrants of Dutch descent to settle in Mexico were Mennonites between 1922 and 1925. Under the protection of Plutarco Elías Calles, religious Mennonites of German and Dutch immigrants settled in the states of the north and the southeastern Mexico where Plautdietsch is still spoken today, a German dialect called "Niederdeutsch" or "Plattdeutsch" in Low-German terminology that is spoken along the border between the Netherlands and Germany.

=== Post-World War II ===
After World War II, Dutch-Mexican relations intensified quickly following the visit of Prince Bernhard to Mexico in 1950. KLM established a direct flight from Amsterdam to Mexico in 1952 and the first Dutch embassador to Mexico arrived in 1954. The number of Dutch Mexicans increased steadily.

== Dutch residents in Mexico ==
- A. A. M. Stols, printer and publisher
- Bob Schalkwijk, photographer
- Carla Stellweg, art critic
- Frans van der Hoff, missionary
- Frans Stoppelman, photographer
- Fred Mulders, guitarist and journalist
- Gerard Hylkema, footballer and hockey player
- Giovanni Korporaal, actor, editor, screenwriter and film director
- Jan Hendrix, artist
- Martijn Kuiper, actor
- Nancy van Overveldt, artist
- Roberto Vander, actor
- Oussama Idrissi, footballer

== Mexicans of Dutch descent ==
- Allan Van Rankin, footballer
- Ariadne Welter, actress
- Gastón Luken Garza, businessman and politician
- Jorge Van Rankin, actor and television host
- Josecarlos Van Rankin, footballer
- Linda Christian, actress

== Mexicans living in the Netherlands ==
- Gabriela Schloesser, recurve archer

== See also ==
- Mennonites in Mexico
- Mexico-Netherlands relations
- White Mexicans
- Belgian Mexicans
- French Mexicans
- German Mexicans
