= Belgian Mexicans =

Belgian Mexicans Belga-mexicanos
Total population
- 309

Regions with significant populations
- Veracruz: 108
- Aguascalientes: 65
- Mexico City: 58

Languages
- Mexican Spanish, Dutch, French and German.

Religion
- Christianity

Related ethnic groups
- Belgian people, Belgian diaspora

Belgian Mexicans are Mexican citizens of Belgian descent or Belgium-born people living in Mexico.

== History ==
In the 16th century, Belgian tradespeople traveled to what would become present day Mexico. In 1537, Belgians began Mexico's first brewery. Flemish missionaries operated in the Valley of Mexico. The Augustinian Nic. de Witte tenaciously defended indigenous interests in the isolated highlands of Meztitlán (1543–63). During the 17th century, Jesuit missionaries originally from the Spanish Netherlands, moved among semi-nomads (Yaquis and Tarahumaras) in the inhospitable northern Mexico.

A cultural elite of artists and related professions supported evangelization with their artistic and didactic production. In addition to the importation of mass-produced Flemish works of art (Maerten de Vos), immigrant Flemish artists, almost all of whom were from Antwerp, worked in Mexico. Simon Pereyns (1568–89), initially a viceregal court painter, created large-scale altarpieces in various convents. The sculptor A.Suster (1563-1602) decorated the interior of several churches. Printer CA Cesar, alias Keyser, had a turbulent path. Finally, Diego de Borgraf (1640-'86) was the founder of the baroque-style “Pueblo School”. But after all, Flemish immigration to Mexico was never a massive phenomenon. Around 1650, when the flow stopped, there were only about 150 people.

Pedro de Gante, a Franciscan friar active between 1523 and 1572 who contributed to education of the indigenous peoples by very innovative means: he designed a catechism made of hieroglyphs, organized primary education, craft schools and artistic workshops and promotes the creation of hospitals for the Indians. His effigy appears at the foot of the statue of Christopher Columbus, erected on Avenida de la Reforma in Mexico City. The changes brought about by President Porfirio Díaz's liberal economic policies have made it possible to normalize the situation between the two countries. Starting in the 1830s, Belgian engineers worked in Mexico to build the first Mexican railroad with Belgian materials; there were even plans for a Nueva Bélgica, a colony to be built in Chihuahua. Once political relations were restored in 1879, the Belgian travelers tried to win public opinion in favor of Mexico. Because of this, Belgian traders, small industries, teachers and scientists began to immigrate to Mexico in a real 'bonanza atmosphere'. To set up flax cultivation in the state of Chihuahua, a new ambitious colonization project, “New Belgium”, was devised under the leadership of veteran Ch. Loomans (1884). For a hundred Belgian emigrants, however, this adventure ended in a fiasco.

Between 1885 and 1900, trade exchanges and capital investment with Mexico increased significantly. Exports to Antwerp mainly include products for agriculture, forestry and minerals. Belgium, for its part, mainly exports metal products, which in Mexico are used, for example, for the tram lines in Mérida or the town hall of Orizaba. But in the 1910s, the revolutionary turmoil again disrupts the success. The Belgian presence in the country drops to about 20 people and several companies went bankrupt. When the situation normalized in the course of the 1920s, Belgian enthusiasm for Mexico does not immediately return.

== Notable people ==
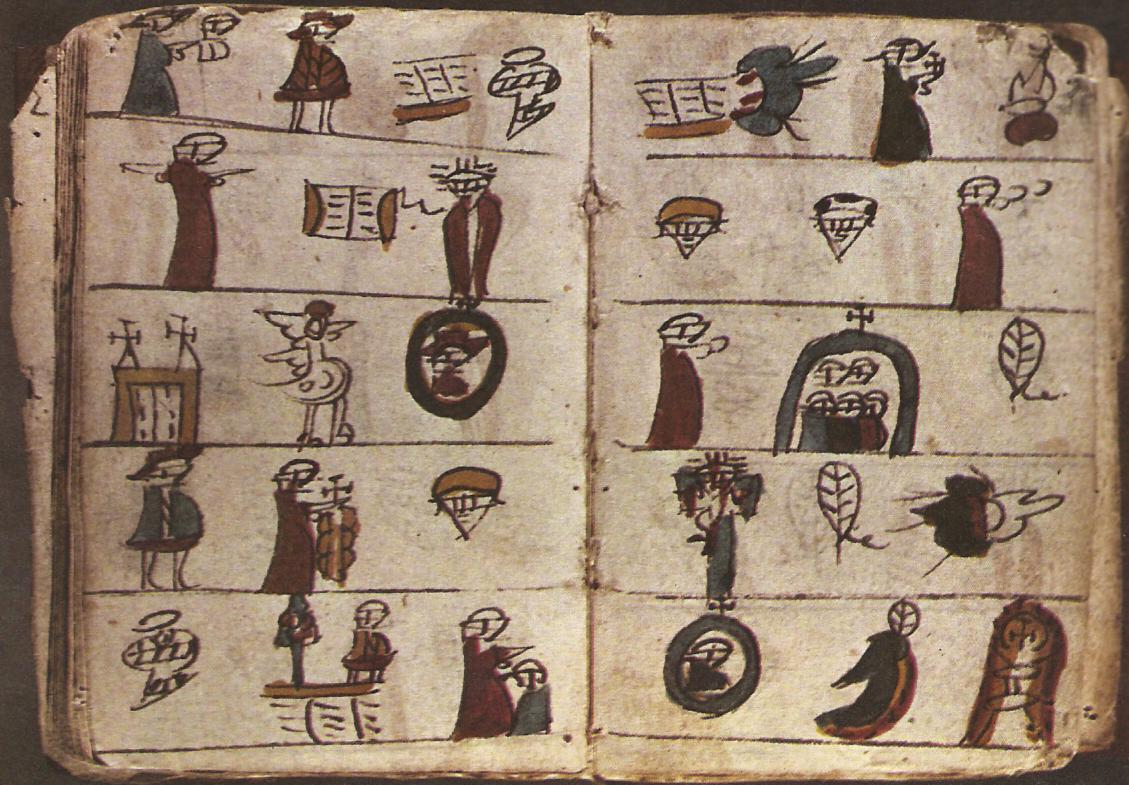
Pedro de Gante devised a catechism in rebus for the native Mexicans.

- Bernard Jourdain, racing driver
- Francis Alÿs, artist known for interdisciplinary works of art, architecture, and social practices.
- Carlos Francisco de Croix, marqués de Croix of Lille was appointed as viceroy (1766–1771). He suppressed native Mexican rebellions in the north of Mexico and expelled the Jesuits on June 25, 1767.
- Carlota of Mexico, born Princess Charlotte of Belgium, daughter of King Leopold I of Belgium. She became empress consort at the birth of the Second Mexican Empire, as wife of Emperor Maximilian I of Mexico.
- Edgar Everaert founder of Club Deportivo Guadalajara, popularly known as Chivas
- Eugenia Cauduro, actress
- Jacqueline Bracamontes, actress
- Michel Jourdain Jr., racing driver
- Michel Jourdain Sr., racing driver
- Pedro de Gante, who was active from 1523 to 1572, devised a catechism in rebus form. He organized a craft industry and art education and built hospitals for the native Mexicans.
- Gustave Maryssael, an electrical engineer started SOFINA. In 1936 he was president of the Companía Mexicana the Luz y Fuerza Motriz and later director-general in 1962.
- Simon Pereyns of Antwerp is considered the founder of Mexican painting, and some of his painted screens are in the Mexico City Metropolitan Cathedral.
- Jan de Vos, historian who became guest-advisor to the Zapatista Army of National Liberation (EZLN) during the peace talks with the Mexican Government.
- Ronald Zollman, from 1994 to 2002, was music director of the National Autonomous University of Mexico Philharmonic Orchestra.

== See also ==
- Belgium–Mexico relations
- Belgians
- Demographics of Mexico
- Dutch Mexicans
- French Mexicans
- German Mexicans
- White Mexicans
