= Mexico–Netherlands relations =

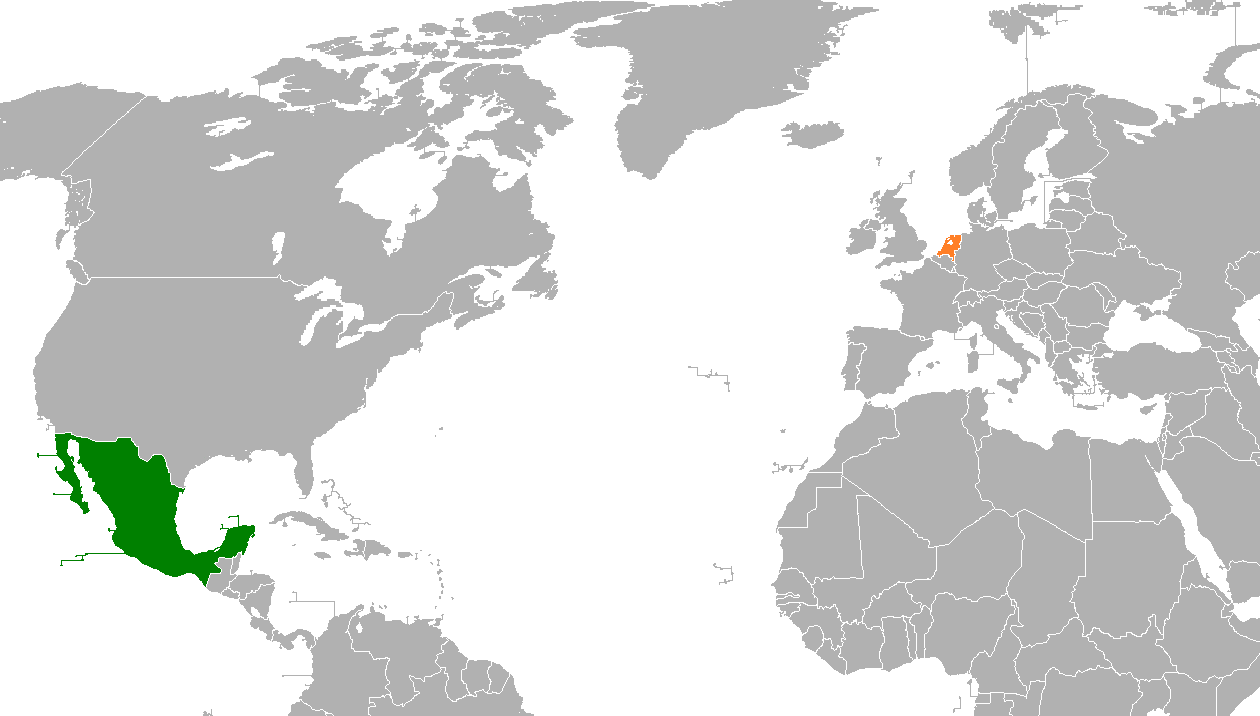

- Mexico: Netherlands

The nations of Mexico and the Netherlands established diplomatic relations in 1827. Both nations are members of the Organisation for Economic Co-operation and Development and the United Nations.

== History ==
The Netherlands was the second European country to recognize Mexico soon after gaining independence from Spain in 1821. That same year, the Netherlands began transporting goods between Mexico and Europe as the Netherlands was seen as a "neutral" nation during disputes between France and Spain. In 1826, the Netherlands appointed a consul-general in Mexico City. Mexico reciprocated the gesture by opening a diplomatic office in The Hague.

Diplomatic relations were officially established between both nations on 15 June 1827 with the signing of the Treaty of Friendship, Navigation and Commerce. Between 1864 - 1878, diplomatic relations were suspended by Mexican President Benito Juárez after the Dutch government recognized the government of Emperor Maximilian I in Mexico by French occupational forces of Emperor Napoleon III. This period was known as the Second Mexican Empire.

In 1940, the Mexican legation in The Hague was closed as a result of the Second World War and was re-opened in 1946. In May 1954, both nations elevated their diplomatic representations to embassies, respectively. In 1963, President Adolfo López Mateos became the first Mexican head-of-state to visit the Netherlands. In the following years, there would be subsequent visits by future Mexican Presidents to the Netherlands.

In 1964, Dutch Queen Juliana paid an official visit to Mexico, becoming the first Dutch monarch to visit the country. In November 2009, Queen Beatrix also paid an official visit to Mexico. In 2016, Máxima of the Netherlands paid her first official visit to Mexico as Queen (previously having visited the country as Princess in 2009 and in 2011).

In 2018 Mexican President Enrique Peña Nieto paid an official visit to the Netherlands to celebrate the 190 years anniversary between both nations. In March 2024, Dutch Minister for Foreign Trade Geoffrey van Leeuwen paid a visit to Mexico where he met with his counterpart and met with representatives of Dutch businesses operating in Mexico.

== High-level visits ==
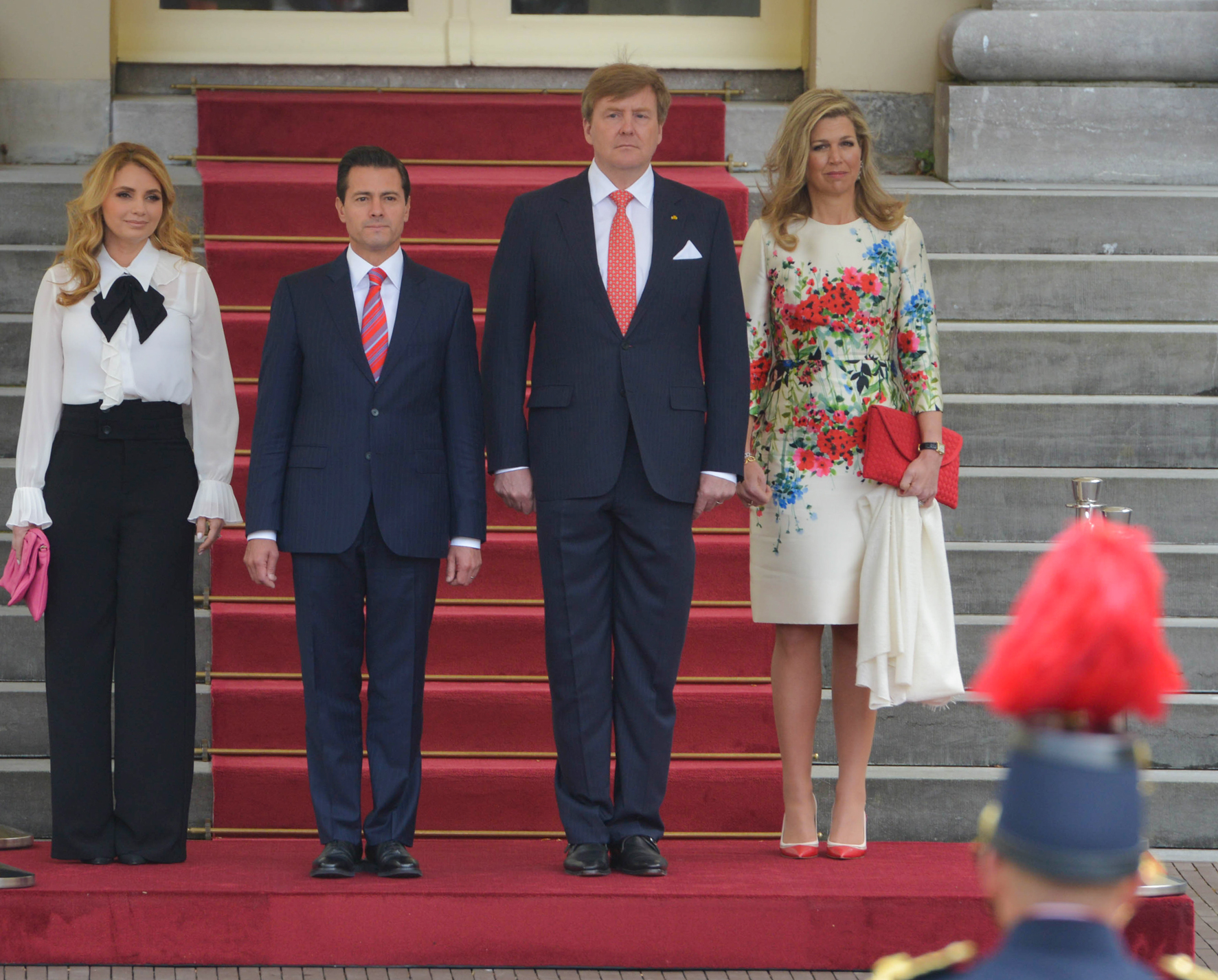
Official visit of Mexican President Enrique Peña Nieto to the Netherlands; 2018.

High-level visits from Mexico to the Netherlands

- President Adolfo López Mateos (1963)
- President Carlos Salinas de Gortari (1993)
- President Felipe Calderón (2009)
- President Vicente Fox (2003)
- Foreign Secretary José Antonio Meade (2013, 2015)
- Foreign Secretary Claudia Ruiz Massieu (2016)
- Foreign Undersecretary Carlos de Icaza (2016)
- President Enrique Peña Nieto (2018)

High-level visits from the Netherlands to Mexico

- Queen Juliana of the Netherlands (1964)
- Prime Minister Jan Peter Balkenende (2004)
- Queen Beatrix of the Netherlands (2009)
- Prince (current King) Willem-Alexander of the Netherlands (2009)
- Queen (and as Princess) Máxima of the Netherlands (2009, 2011, 2016)
- Foreign Minister Bert Koenders (2015)
- Foreign Minister Stef Blok (2019)
- Foreign Trade Minister Geoffrey van Leeuwen (2024)

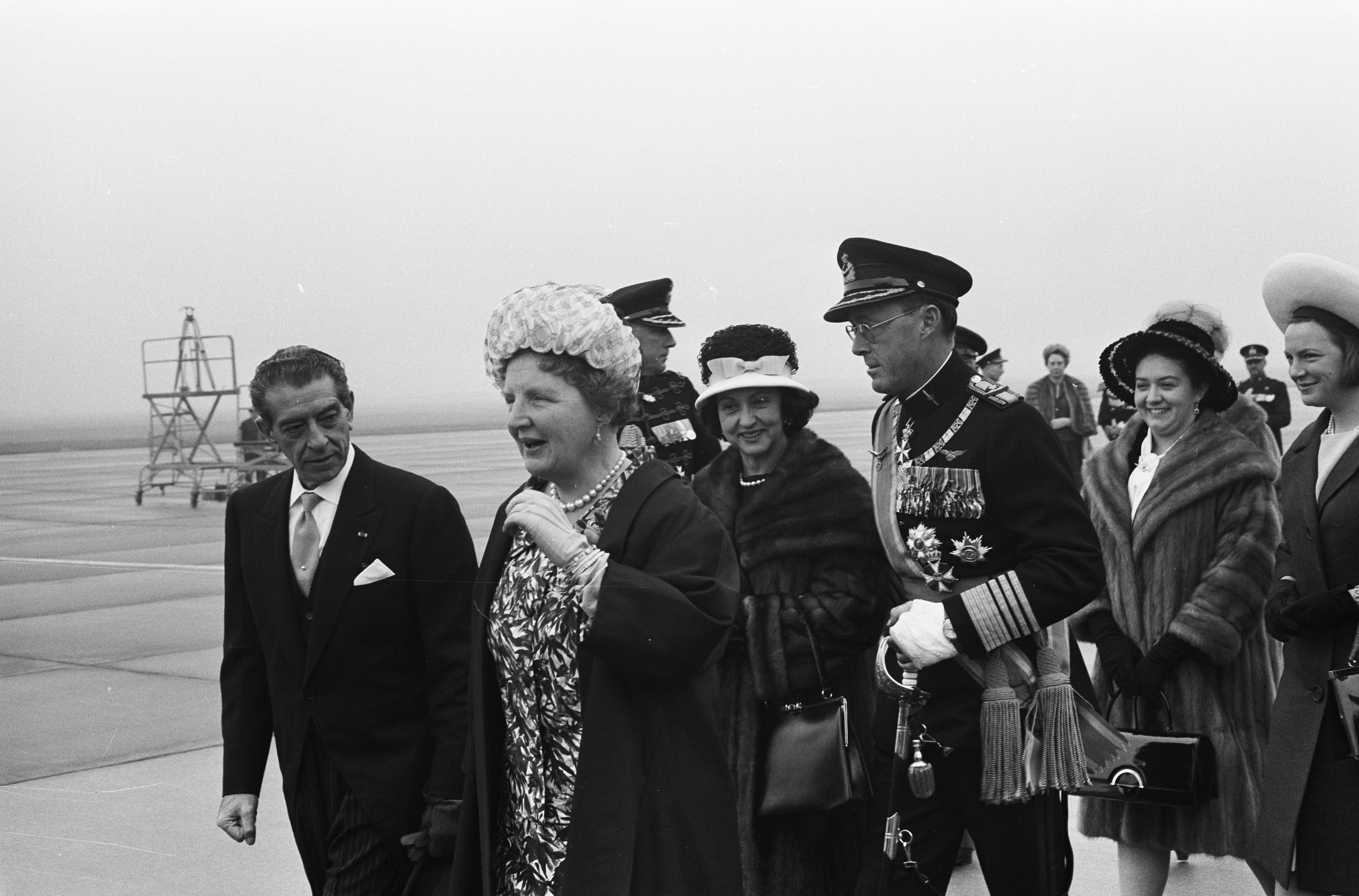
President Adolfo López Mateos alongside Queen Juliana in The Hague; 1963.

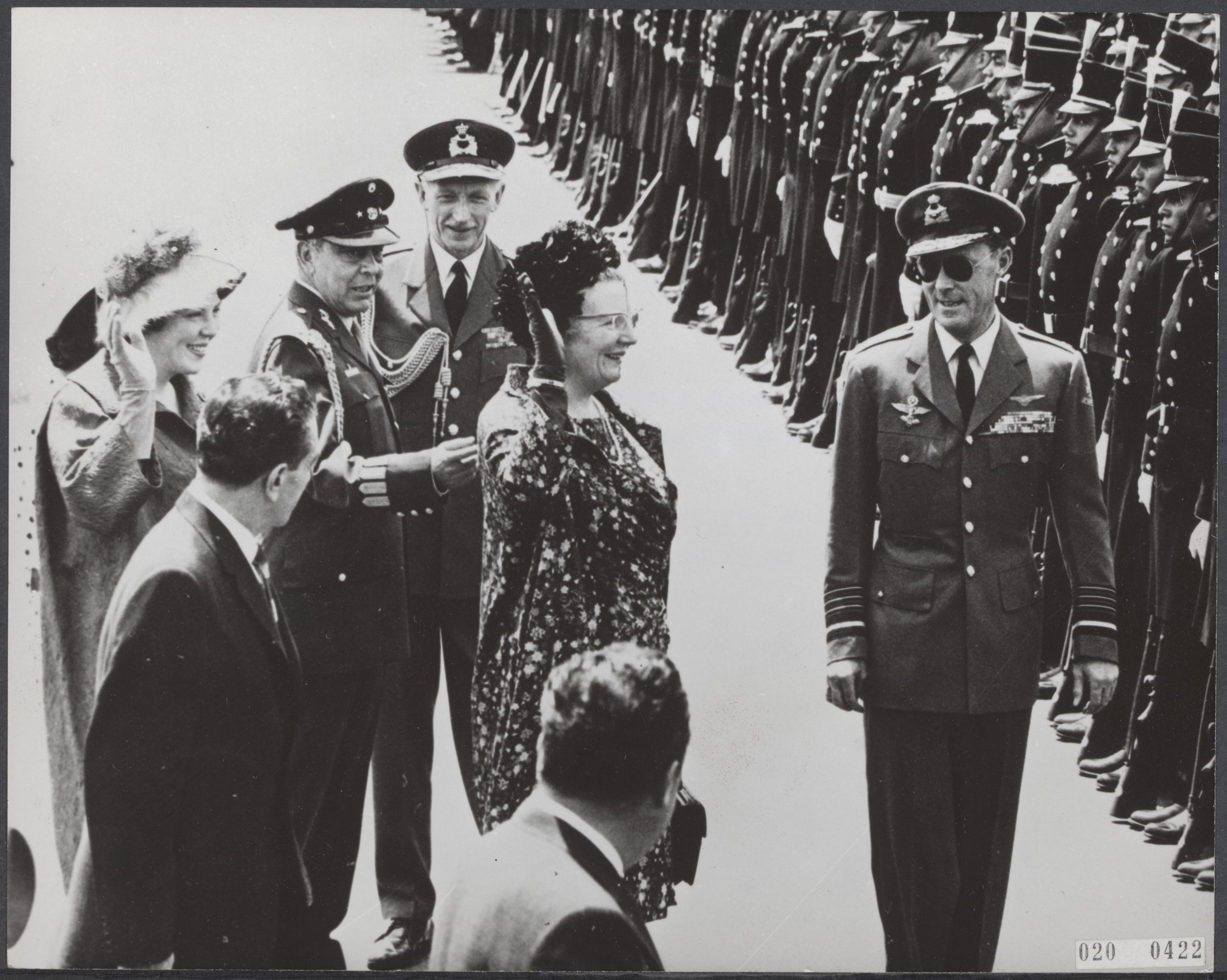
Queen Juliana on a visit to Mexico City with President Adolfo López Mateos; 1964.

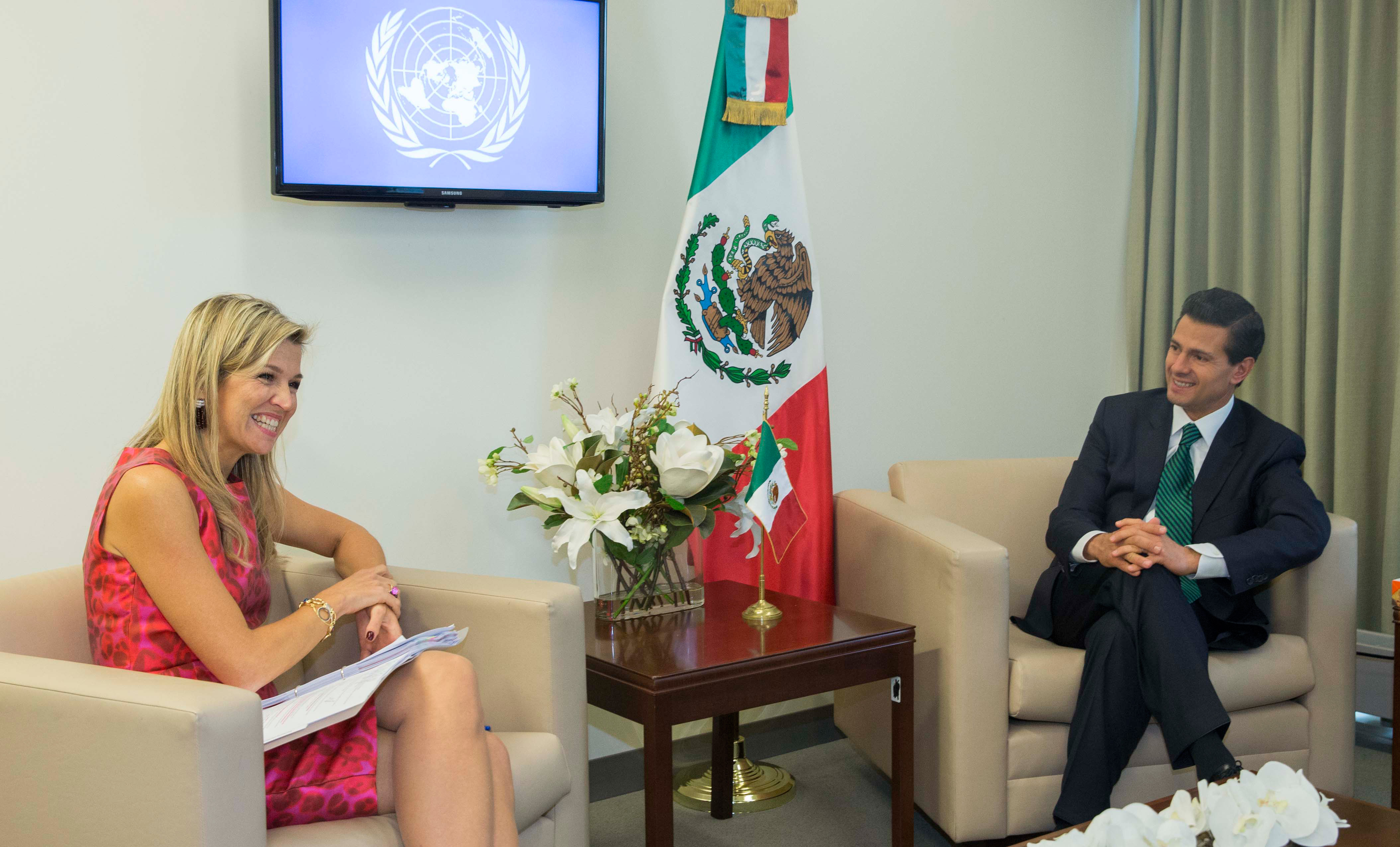
Queen Máxima of the Netherlands and President Enrique Peña Nieto in New York City; 2015.

== Bilateral agreements ==
Both nations have signed several bilateral agreement such as a Treaty of Friendship, Navigation and Commerce (1827); Extradition Treaty (1907); Trade Agreement (1950); Treaty for Cultural Relations (1964); Air Transportation Agreement (1971); Agreement to Avoid Double Taxation and Prevent Tax Evasion in Taxes on Income (1993); Agreement for the Reciprocal Promotion and Protection of Investments (1998); Agreement between Mexico and the Netherlands in relation to the Netherlands Antilles on the Exchange of Information on Tax Matters (2009); and an Agreement between Mexico and Netherlands, with respect to Aruba, for the Exchange of Information with Respect for Taxes (2013).

== Tourism and Transportation ==
There are direct flights between both nations with the following airlines: Aeroméxico, KLM and TUI fly Netherlands.

== Trade relations ==
In 1997, Mexico signed a Free Trade Agreement with the European Union (which includes the Netherlands). In 2023, total trade between the two nations amounted to US$4.6 billion. Mexico's main exports to the Netherlands include: telephones and mobile phones, data processing machines, electrical equipment, medical equipment, minerals, chemical based products, products of iron or steel, parts for motor vehicles, fruits, juice, honey, alcohol, and livestock. The Netherlands main exports to Mexico include: electronics, machinery, products of iron or non-alloy steel, oils of petroleum, tractors, motor cars and other vehicles, chemical based products, medical equipment, malt extract, seeds, cheese and other dairy products. Several Dutch multinational companies such as C&A, Heineken, Koppert, Philips, Rabobank, Royal Brinkman and Signify (among others) operate in Mexico.

== Resident diplomatic missions ==
- Mexico has an embassy in The Hague.
- Netherlands has an embassy in Mexico City.
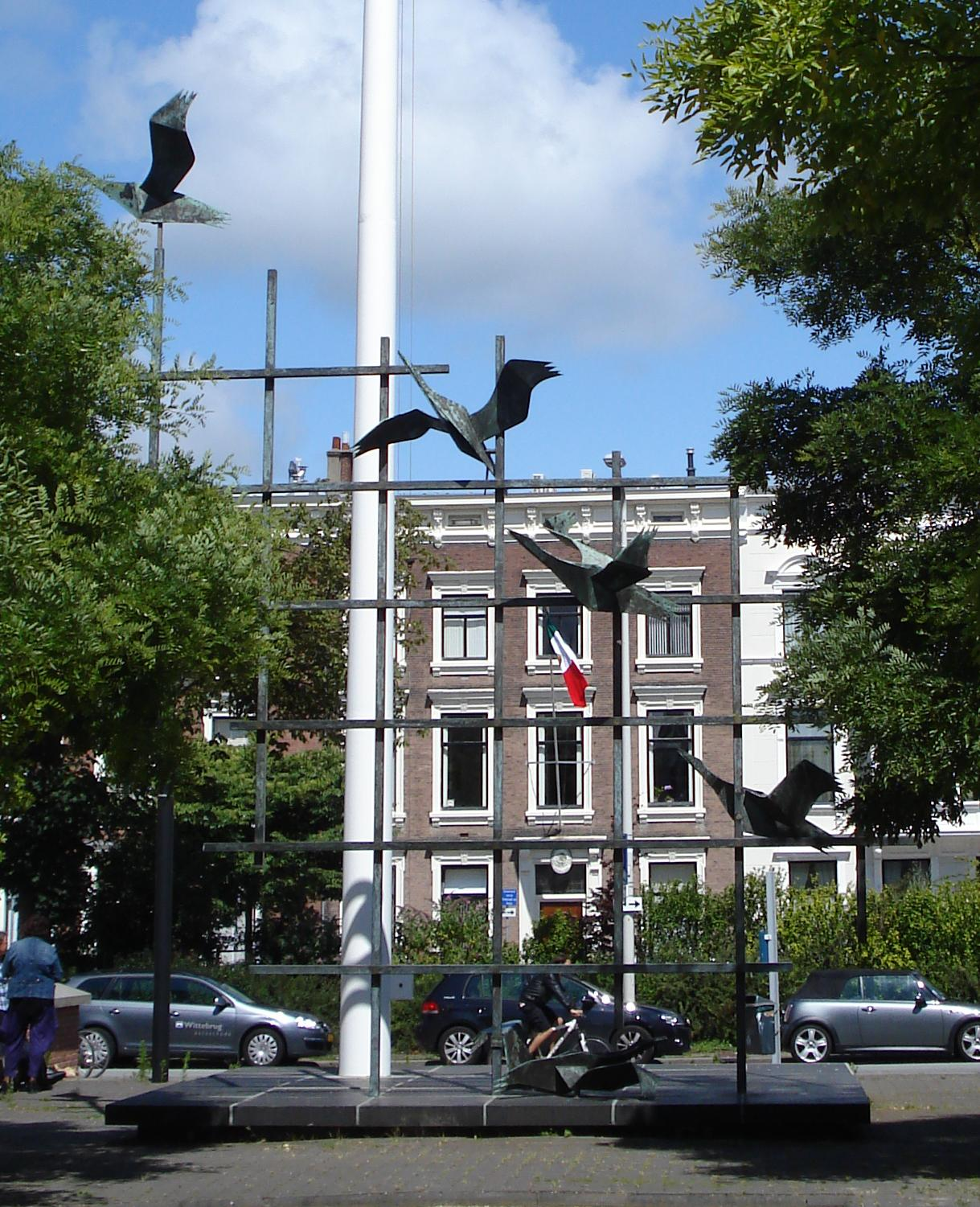
Embassy of Mexico in The Hague

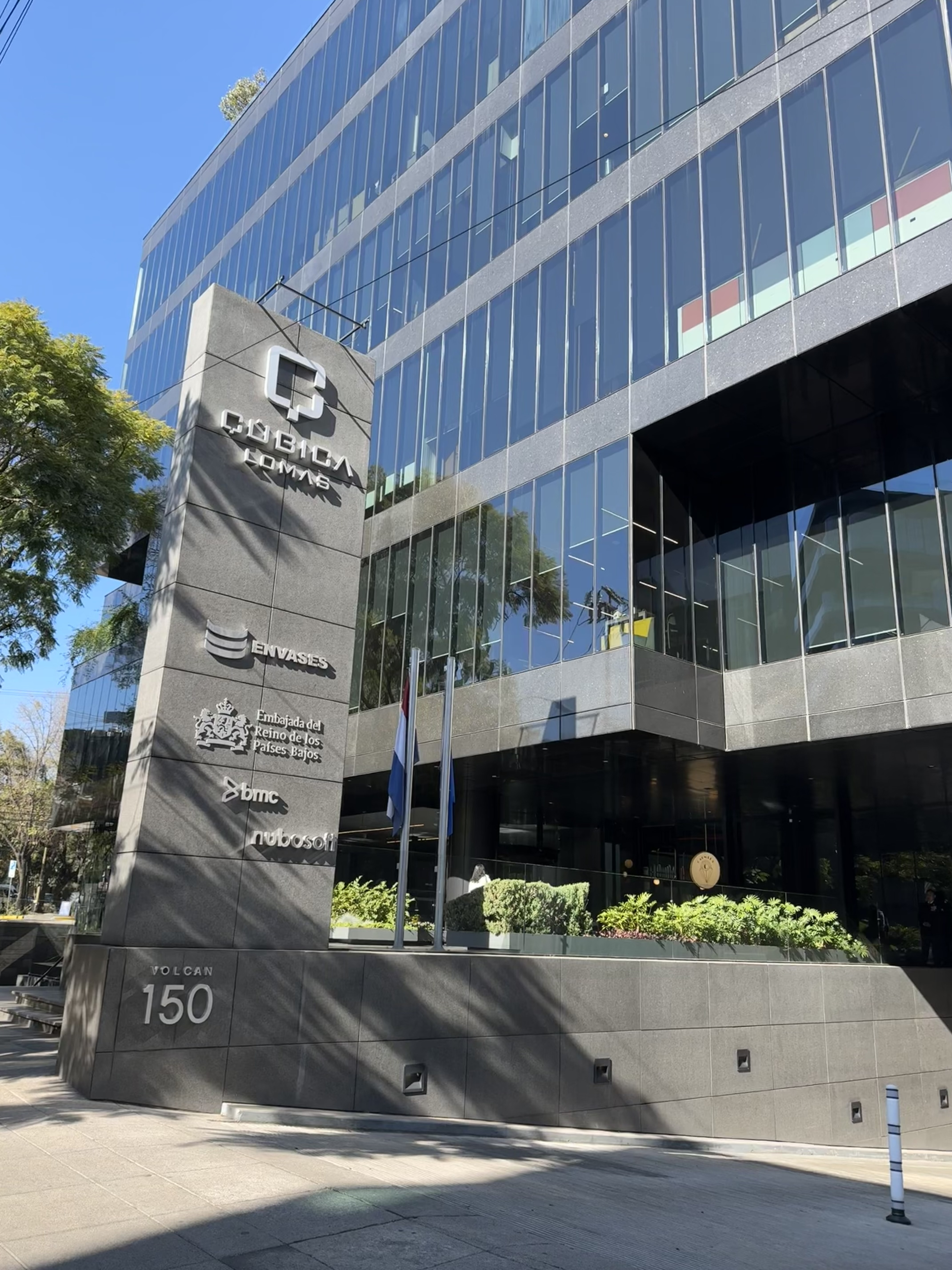
Embassy of the Netherlands in Mexico City

== See also ==
- Dutch Mexicans
- Foreign relations of Mexico
- Foreign relations of the Netherlands
