= Brinkman (disambiguation) =

Brinkman is a surname.

Brinkman may also refer to:

- Someone who practices brinkmanship
- Former name of Royal Brinkman, a horticultural company
- Brinkman, Oklahoma, a rural community in Oklahoma, USA
- Brinkman v. Miami University
- Brinkmann, Córdoba, Argentina
