= Belgium–Mexico relations =

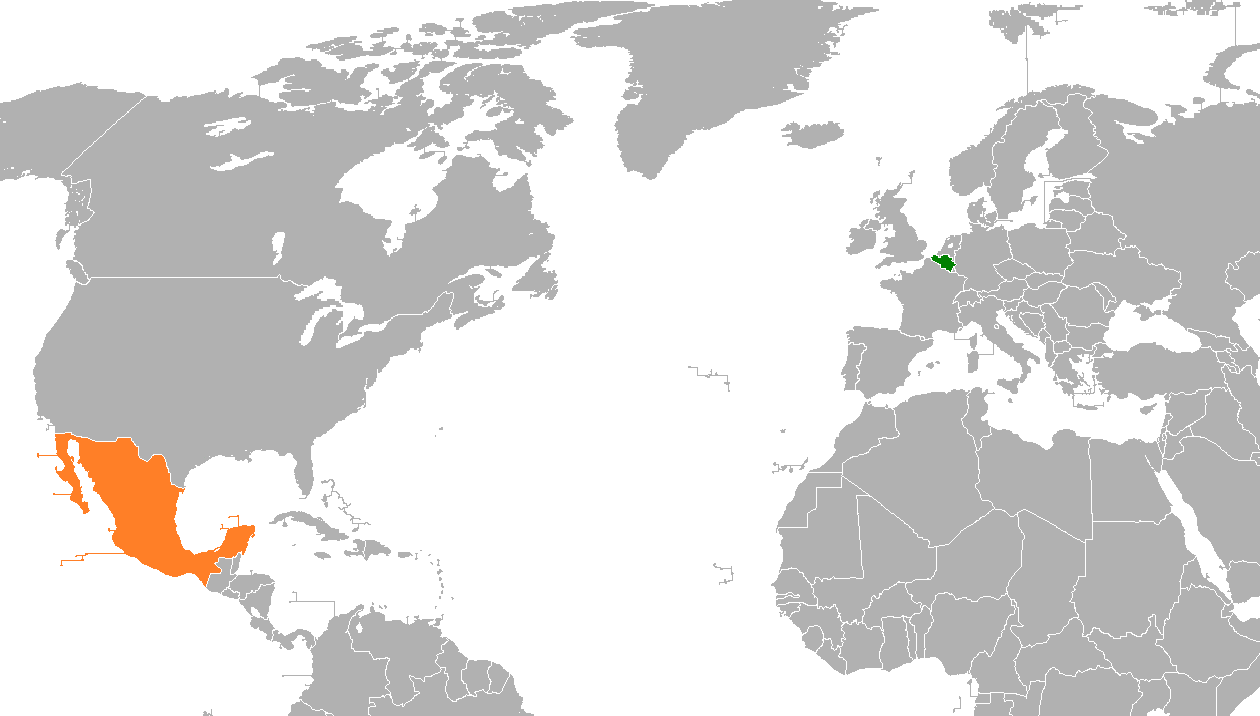

- Belgium: Mexico

The nations of Belgium and Mexico established contact in 1836, when Belgium—itself newly independent—recognized the independence of Mexico, however, diplomatic relations were officially established between both nations in 1861. Both nations are members of the Organisation for Economic Co-operation and Development and the United Nations.

== History ==
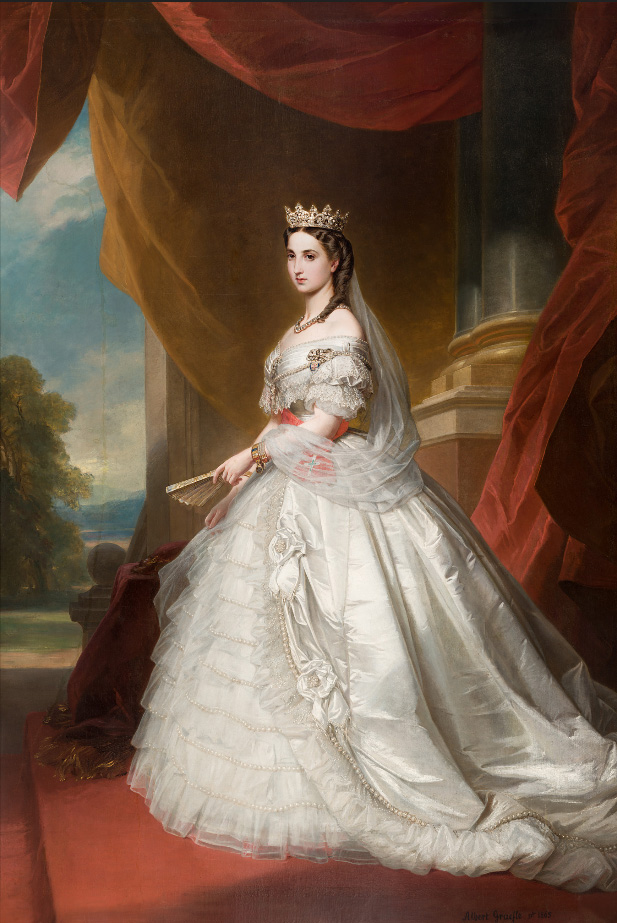
Portrait of Charlotte of Belgium as Empress of Mexico; 1864.

In the 16th century, Belgian tradespeople traveled to what would become Mexico. In 1537, Belgians began Mexico's first brewery. Starting in the 1830s, Belgian engineers worked in Mexico to build the first Mexican railroad with Belgian materials; there were even plans for a Nueva Bélgica, a colony to be built in Chihuahua.

Diplomatic relations were started in 1825 when Mexico established consular relations with the Kingdom of the Netherlands. Belgium became independent in 1830, and in 1838, representatives were sent to Mexico. The first consulate-level representatives were sent to Mexico in 1842. In 1861, both nations signed a Treaty of Friendship thus formally establishing diplomatic relations.

In 1861, France, under Emperor Napoleon III, and at the invitation of Mexican conservatives and nobility and with assistance from Belgian King Leopold I, sent troops to invade Mexico and to help create the Second Mexican Empire. While the French were in Mexico (also known as the Second French intervention in Mexico), Maximilian I of Mexico and his wife, Charlotte of Belgium (known as Carlota of Mexico) succeeded the throne in 1864. During the Battle of Tacámbaro on 11 April 1865, 300 Belgian Legion soldiers fighting for the Mexican Empire fought against Mexican Republicans (those who fought for President Benito Juárez). Several dozen Belgian soldiers were killed during the battle.

When Emperor Maximilian I faced execution, Belgium instructed its representative, Hoorickx, to assist the Austrian ambassador's ultimately failed efforts to persuade the Mexicans to grant clemency. After the execution of Emperor Maximilian I in 1867, Belgium and Mexico would not establish diplomatic relations until 1879.

In 1890 Belgium invested US$1.2 million to open a silver and copper mine in Michoacán. In 1900 Baron Moncheur, the Belgian Minister in Mexico, wrote a study of the conditions and resources of southern Mexican states while "contributing in great measure to the development of the commercial relations between Belgium and Mexico." In 1903 the National Railroad of Mexico, in which the Mexican Government had a large financial interest, opened a standard gauge line. The turning of the previous narrow gauge railroad into a standard gauge railroad was accomplished with 25,000 tons of rails from Belgium. By 1913 the National Railroad of Mexico was lobbying the government of Victoriano Huerta not to grant any further rights to the Belgian syndicate competing against them. Again in 1926 Belgium was shipping 1,000 tons of steel rails for the railroad.

During World War II, Mexico closed its diplomatic legation in Brussels and moved its diplomatic staff to London where the Belgian government in exile was residing. In 1940 Belgian residents of Mexico supported Hubert Pierlot as Prime Minister of Belgium during the Nazi occupation. After the war, Mexico returned to having a resident diplomatic legation in Brussels and in 1954, both nations raised their diplomatic legations to embassies. That same year, Belgium opened its embassy in Mexico City on 5 June, 1954.

In 1965, Belgian King Baudouin and Queen Fabiola paid a visit to Mexico. In 1973, Luis Echeverría Álvarez became the first Mexican President to visit Belgium. In 1999, Prime Minister Jean-Luc Dehaene became the first Belgian head-of-government to visit Mexico. There would be many more high-level visits between leaders of both nations.

In 1980, Mexican protesters peacefully occupied both the Belgian and Danish embassies to demand freedom for political prisoners and better living conditions for Mexicans.

In 2018, the Brussels' Flower Carpet featured cultural elements from the state of Guanajuato, Mexico, including symbolism from the Chupícuaro, Otomí and Purépecha cultures. In February 2019, Princess Astrid of Belgium paid a visit to Mexico where she led an economic mission to Mexico that included events in Mexico City and Monterrey and she met with President Andrés Manuel López Obrador. In 2023, 20 pre-hispanic artifacts were returned to Mexico from Belgium.

In April 2026, Mexican Foreign Minister Roberto Velasco Álvarez paid a visit to Belgium and met with representatives of the European Union.

== High-level visits ==
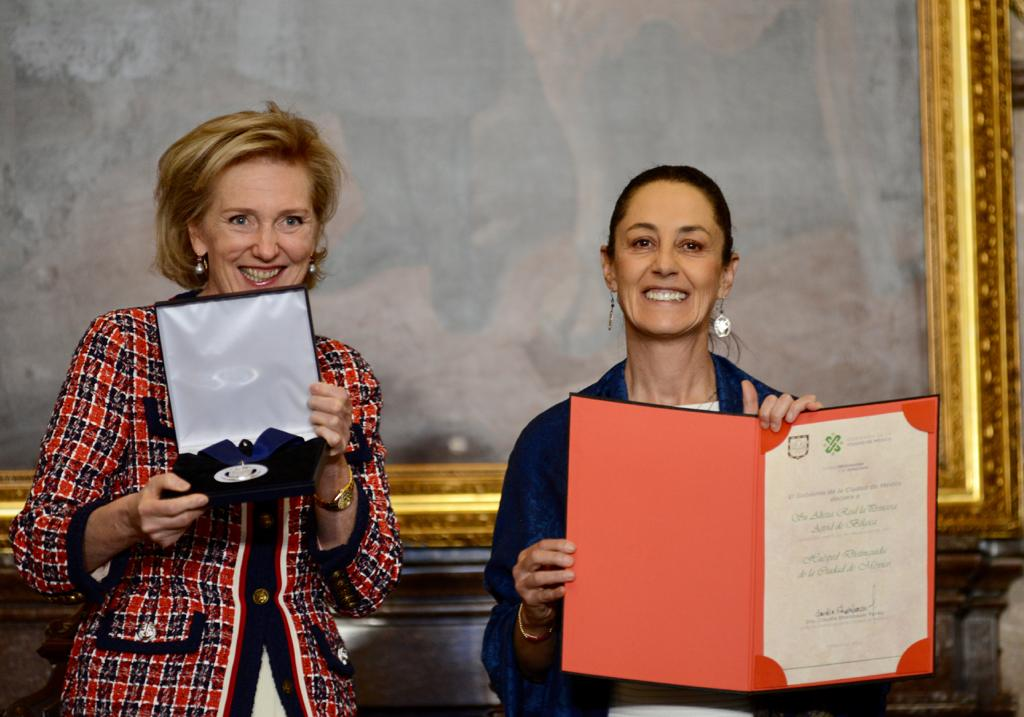
Princess Astrid of Belgium with then Mayor of Mexico City (current President of Mexico) Claudia Sheinbaum; February 2019.

High-level visits from Belgium to Mexico

- King Baudouin of Belgium (1965)
- King (then Prince) Philippe of Belgium (1998, 2003, 2009, 2010)
- Prime Minister Jean-Luc Dehaene (1999)
- Prime Minister Guy Verhofstadt (2002)
- Princess Astrid of Belgium (2019)

High-level visits from Mexico to Belgium

- President Luis Echeverría (1973)
- President Miguel de la Madrid (1985)
- President Carlos Salinas de Gortari (1990, 1993)
- President Vicente Fox (2002)
- President Felipe Calderón (2007)
- President Enrique Peña Nieto (2015)

== Bilateral agreements ==
Both nations have signed several bilateral agreements such as a Treaty of Friendship, Navigation and Commerce (1861); Treaty of Trade and Shipping (1895); Extradition Treaty (1938); Agreement for Cultural Cooperation (1964); Agreement to Avoid Double Taxation and Prevent Tax Evasion in Taxes on Income (1992); and an Air Transportation Agreement (1999).

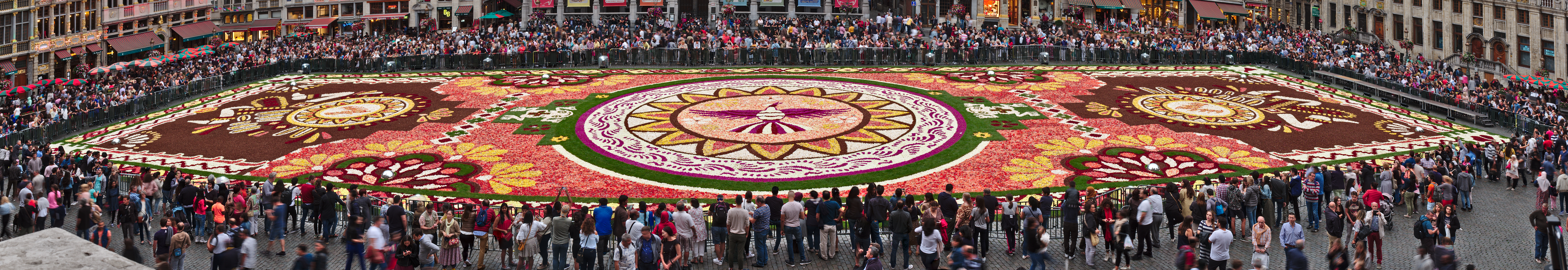
The 2018 Flower Carpet in the Grand-Place of Brussels.

== Transportation ==
There are direct flights between Brussels Airport and Cancún International Airport with TUI fly Belgium.

== Trade ==
In 1997, Mexico signed a Free Trade Agreement with the European Union (which includes Belgium). In 2023, two-way trade between both nations amounted to US$3.1 billion. Belgium's main exports to Mexico include: chemical based products, medicine and pharmaceutical products, electronic equipment, aluminum products, articles of iron and steel, motor cars and other vehicles, food based products, chocolates, horses and cattle, and diamonds. Mexico's main exports to Belgium include: chemical based products, medical equipment, minerals, articles of copper, electrical equipment, machinery, motor vehicles, vinyl and plastic articles, coffee, vegetables, fruits and nuts, honey, and alcohol.

Belgian multinational companies such as Agfa-Gevaert, Janssen Pharmaceutica and Katoen Natie operate in Mexico. Belgian company Anheuser-Busch InBev owns a 50% share in Grupo Modelo, Mexico's leading brewer and owner of the global Corona brand.

== Resident diplomatic missions ==
- Belgium has an embassy in Mexico City.
- Mexico has an embassy in Brussels.

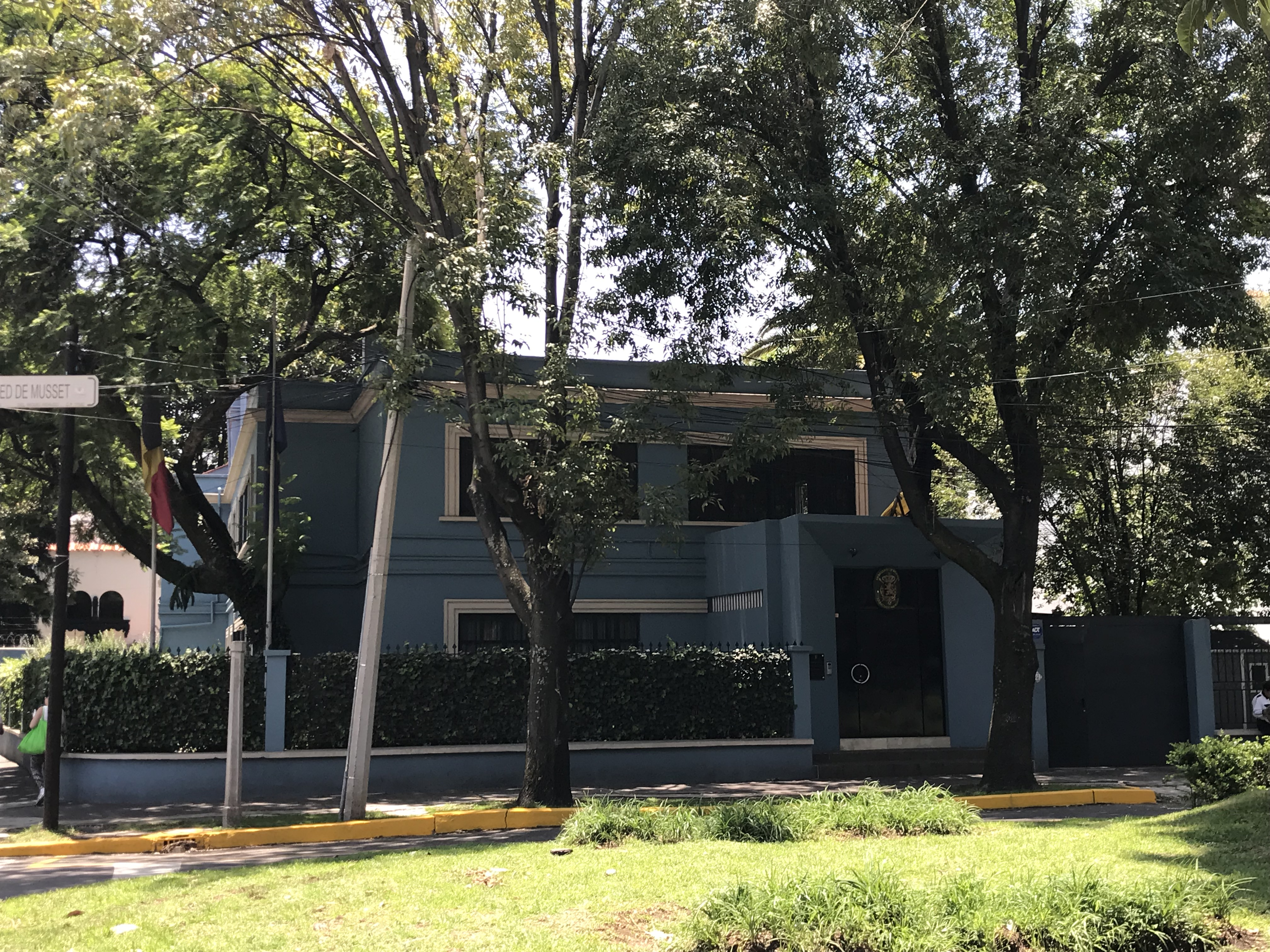
Embassy of Belgium in Mexico City

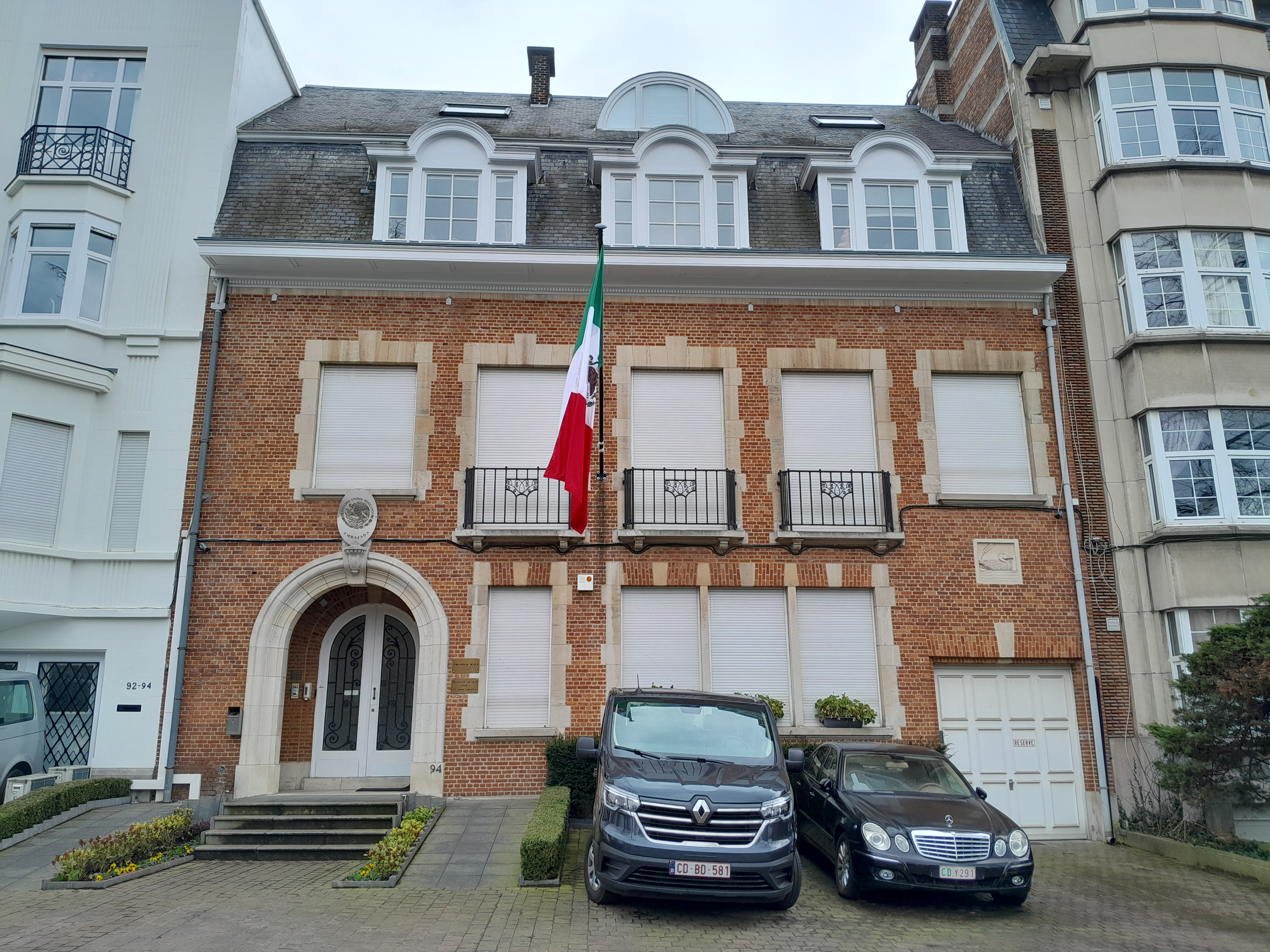
Embassy of Mexico in Brussels

== See also ==
- Foreign relations of Belgium
- Foreign relations of Mexico
- Battle of Tacámbaro
- Belgian Mexicans
