= Gastón Luken Garza =

Mexican entrepreneur and politician

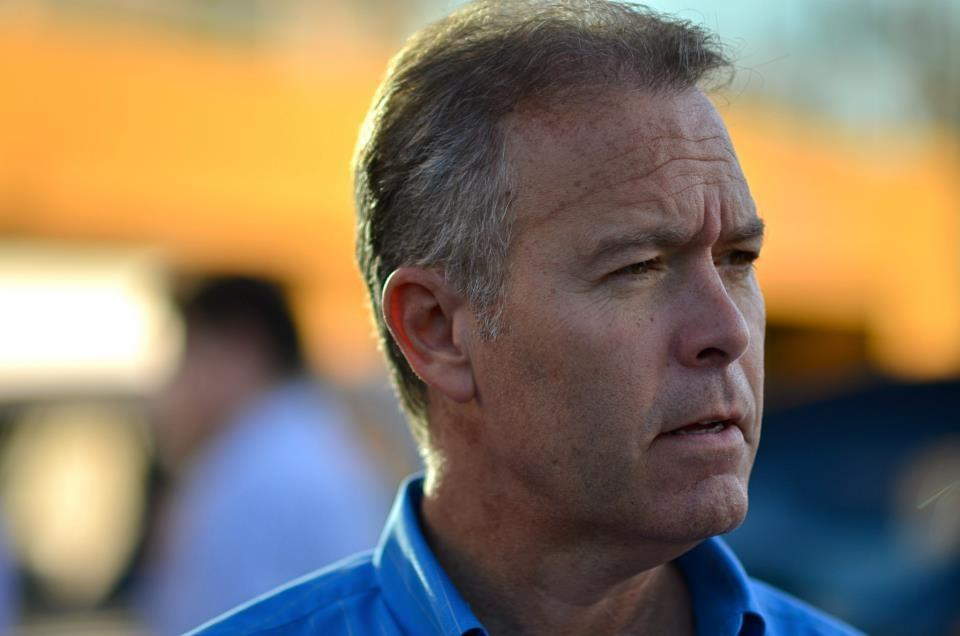
- Born: 6 September 1959 (age 66); Monterrey, Nuevo León, Mexico
- Education: Monterrey Institute of Technology and Higher Education
- Occupation: Politician
- Political party: Independent
- Spouse: Alicia Luna Alvarado

Gastón Luken Garza (born 1959) is a Mexican entrepreneur and politician. He has been president of the State Electoral Institute of Baja California, comptroller general of the government of Mexico City, citizen advisor for the Federal Electoral Institute and congressmen for the National Action Party (PAN) in the LXI Legislature of the Mexican Congress. In 2016, he was the first independent candidate to run for mayor of Tijuana.

== Life ==
Luken Garza was born in Monterrey in 1959 to prominent businessman Gaston Luken Aguilar and his wife Alejandra Garza. He grew up in Baja California, where he currently lives in Tijuana with his wife Alicia Luna Alvarado. He has three children Analicia, Gaston and Alvaro.

Luken has a bachelor's degree in business administration from the Monterrey Institute of Technology and Higher Education (1981) and has postgraduate studies in upper management in Ipade (1985).

He is fluent in English and Spanish.

== Political career ==
Luken worked as a citizen advisor to election institutes at the state and federal levels from 1995 to 2003. This included positions as president of the Electoral Institute of Baja California for the 1995 elections and as board member of the Federal Electoral Institute from 2001 to 2003.

From 2000 to 2003, he was special advisor to the government of Mexico City, overseeing the city budget and anticorruption efforts regarding public servants.

Luken was also an advisor to the Mexican-American Studies Center of the UC San Diego and to Pronatura in Baja California.

In 2009, Luken was elected as a federal deputy with the National Action Party, representing the fifth district in Tijuana. He presided over a congressional commission for accountability and was vice chairman of the Governing Congressional Commission.

In 2014, Mexico changed the law which allowed for more independent candidates. He was the first independent to announce a run for mayor of Tijuana in 2015. In 2016, he was the first independent to get enough signatures to be on the ballot for the same position. He was able to get 32,263 validated signatures, enough to meet the 2.5% of eligible voters, one of only six independent candidates to be able to do so in the entire state. Luken sought to take advantage of widespread voter mistrust of the established political parties. This campaign compared their efforts to Obama's presidential runs, calling it the first grassroots campaign in Tijuana. They even made their own versions of Obama's Hope posters. Emulating the highly popular independent governor of Chihuahua, he used curse words and colloquialisms in his campaign. However, he was criticized as taking advantage of the new system and not really an independent because of his connections to the National Action Party, which Luken stated during his run that he was never officially affiliated with.

In 2013, he registered with the National Action Party.

== Business career ==
Son of a prominent businessman, Luken's first foray into business was the establishment of the bakery chain La Baguette de Mexicali, when he was 23 years old. He served as the company's general director from 1982 to 1997.

He has since founded and advised various types of businesses in the construction, industrial and finance sectors. He ran Proxima with his father before 2009 which partnered with Sempra Energy in San Diego to bring natural gas into Mexicali in the 2000s. Luken was general director of Dunor (1985-2000) and Panatec (1985-2009).

Luken was named Businessman of the Year by various publications and organizations as well as Man of the Year by Semanario ZETA.
