= Battle of Tacámbaro =

Coordinates: 19.2356°N 101.4569°W

- Part of the Second French intervention in Mexico
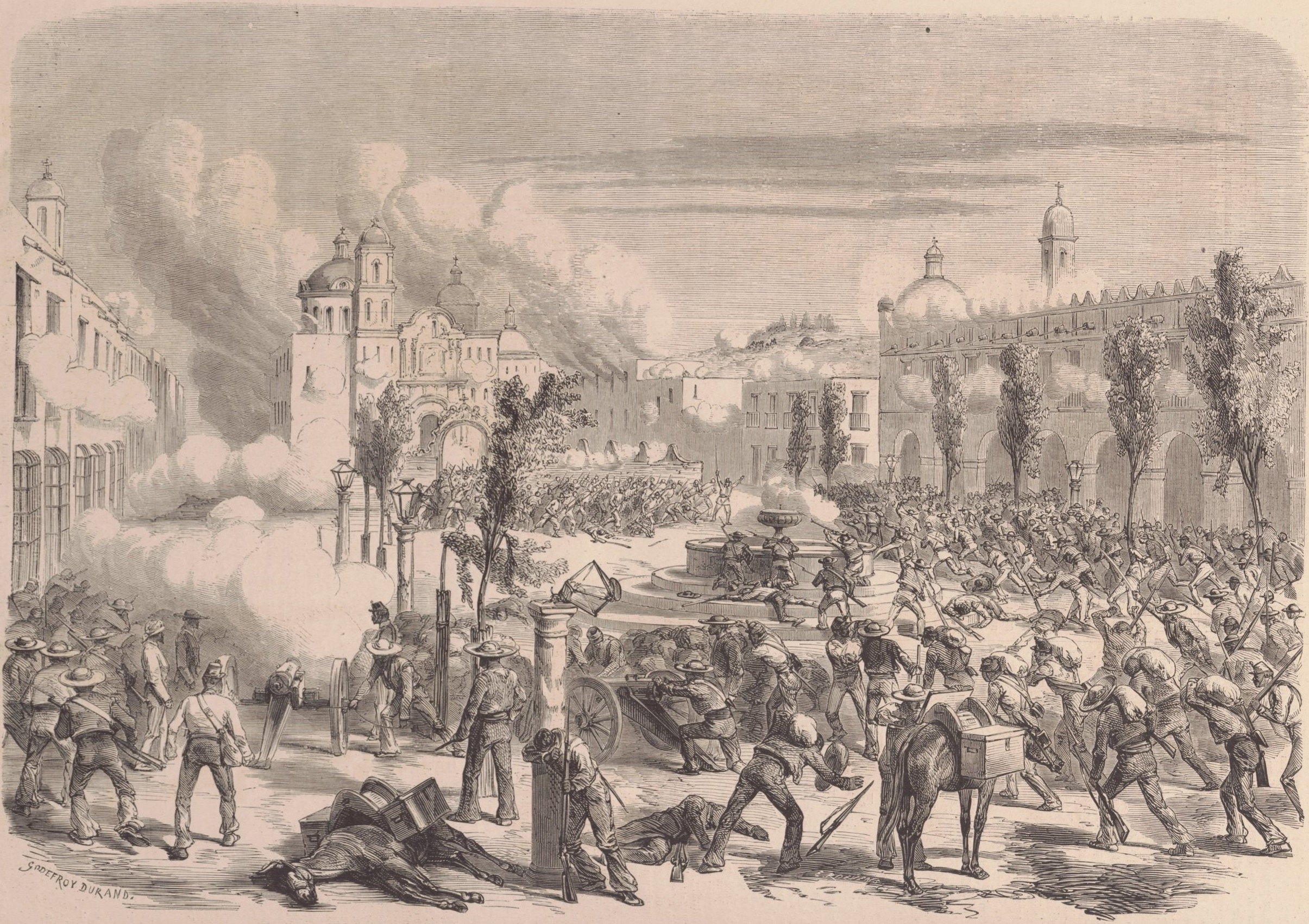
- Depiction of the Battle of Tacámbaro
Date	11 April 1865
Location	Tacámbaro, Michoacán, Mexico
Result	Republican victory

Belligerents
(Mexico) Mexican Republicans	(Mexico) Mexican Empire: Belgian Legion

Commanders and leaders
Nicolás Régules	Constant Tydgadt †; Jules Ernest Chazal †; Capt. De Lennoy †

Strength
2,500 infantry 600 cavalry 4 guns	251 infantry 38 cavalry 1 gun

Casualties and losses
30 killed	27 killed 37 wounded 240 captured

The Battle of Tacámbaro was a battle of the French Intervention in Mexico which took place on 11 April 1865 in the state of Michoacán in western Mexico. The battle, named after the town in which it was fought, pitted 300 members of the Belgian Legion supporting the Mexican Empire against approximately 3,000 Mexican republicans.

== Background ==
The Belgian Legion, under the command of Baron Alfred Van der Smissen, had been organized at the request of Emperor Maximilian's wife, Charlotte, and arrived in Mexico on 14 December 1864 to act as her personal bodyguard. The Belgians were placed under the command of Colonel de Potier of France and deployed to Michoacán to assist Maximillian's forces in fighting Republican guerrillas known to be operating in that area.

The state of Michoacán lies within 100 miles of Mexico City. Its proximity to the capital combined with its heavy forests, mountainous terrain and difficult weather made it ideal for guerilla operations. The state's population was largely sympathetic to the Republican cause and the region was laced with routes for smuggling arms and supplies for Republican forces operating in the area. Maximilian found it unacceptable that Republican troops were operating so close to the capital without opposition. He found it important both strategically and politically that his forces quell Republican activity in Michoacán to prevent the destabilization of his regime.

== The battle ==
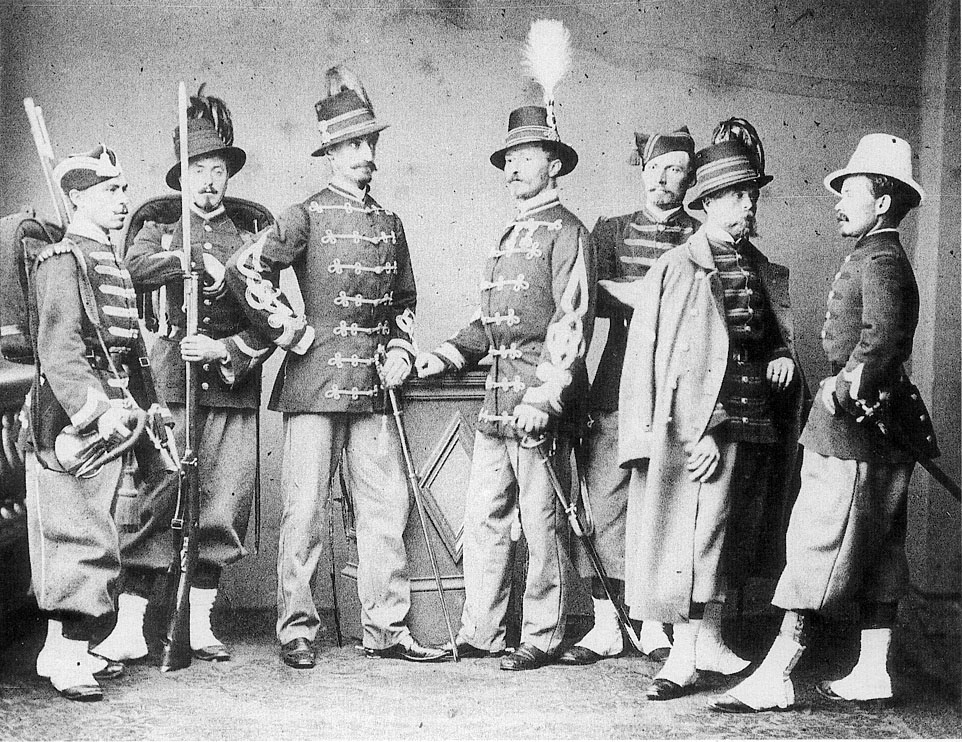
An 1865 photograph of Belgian Legion soldiers

On 3 April 1865, 250–300 Belgians occupied Tacámbaro. Shortly thereafter, Senora Regules, the wife of the Republican General Nicolas Regules, was found rendering medical aid to two guerillas. She was arrested for aiding Republican troops and escorted with her two children by Major Tydgadt and Dr. Lejeune, the Belgian detachments commander and doctor, to the Belgian headquarters. This action was intended to secure the cooperation of General Regules but instead enraged the local population.

On 11 April 1865, General Regules attacked the Belgians with between 3,000 and 3,500 Republican soldiers. Surrounded from all sides, the Belgians held out for five hours, hoping for reinforcements which arrived four days too late. They were finally forced to surrender. While the number of casualties is disputed, it is believed that between fifty and one hundred Belgians were killed and around 200 were taken prisoner.

During the battle, eight of the unit's officers were killed, including the badly wounded Major Tydgadt and his adjutant Captain Ernest Chazal (son of the Belgium's minister of defense, Félix Chazal).

== Aftermath ==
The Belgian prisoners were held through October 1865. Despite threats to execute them if they did not sign a protest against Maximillian, the prisoners were well treated. On 22 November 1865 all were exchanged for Republican prisoners through the work of Republican General Riva Palacio.

While militarily the engagement could hardly be called a "battle", its effect on the Belgian Legion was considerable. Tacámbaro was their first engagement against the Republicans and Empress Charlotte took the loss personally, perceiving it as a "disaster". Baron Alfred Van Der Smissen accused Colonel de Potier of "criminal negligence and gross incompetetence" for sending the inexperienced detachment into what he labeled a "dangerous and exposed position" unsupported, destroying any hopes of the Belgians obtaining an independent military command. On 16 July 1865 the Belgian Legion under Van Der Smissen took revenge, winning the Battle of la Loma. After fighting in several other engagements the Belgian Legion was disbanded in December 1866. The personnel embarked at Vera-Cruz on 20 January 1867 and arrived in Antwerp, Belgium on 9 March where they dispersed.

There are two Tacámbaro monuments in Belgium, one in Oudenaarde and one in Leopoldsburg.

== See also ==
- Belgium–Mexico relations
- List of battles of the French intervention in Mexico
