= Frans Stoppelman =

Dutch photographer (1921–2007)

- Born: 9 January 1921; Amsterdam
- Died: 23 October 2007 (aged 86); Mexico

Frans Stoppelman (9 January 1921 – 23 October 2007) was a Dutch press photographer who worked most of his life in Latin America, especially in Mexico. He published in Life, Paris Match, Quick and Stern. Stoppelman won a contest for best colour picture of the 1968 Olympic Summer Games. He had an eye for contrasts and absurd situations.

== Life ==
=== Youth and education in Amsterdam ===
Frans Stoppelman was born to Lodewijk Stoppelman, a textile merchant, and Hermanda Jacobs. His mother died when Stoppelman was 7. After a dispute with his stepmother at the age of 15, Stoppelman left home. He had two years of secondary education. Through evening courses he obtained entry-level diplomas for Dutch and French language and literature, and commercial administration. He bought his first camera, a Kodak Brownie, using coupons.

=== Refugee and student of photography in Switzerland ===
Because of his Jewish background Stoppelman fled the Netherlands during World War II. He walked from Amsterdam to Switzerland where he arrived on April 13, 1942. Stoppelman was admitted in refugee-workcamp Les Verrieres organized by the Swiss Central Directorate for Homes and Camps. He took pictures for sale to fellow-refugees. One of them, mr. H.M. Verhoeve, made an album that was later donated to the Jewish History Museum in Amsterdam. In Lausanne, Stoppelman followed a training course in photography. After the war, Stoppelman stayed in Switzerland as press photographer.

=== Travels through Latin America ===
In 1949 Stoppelman left Europe for Chile. While he was taking pictures of children in a swimming pool in Santiago, their father, head of the national police, inquired what he was doing. A position as police photographer ensued. Stoppelmans´ eye for absurd situations gave him an international breakthrough. Life magazine published his photo of people trying to get on the first electric stairs in Santiago. Another well-known photo is a Pietá picture of Grete Mostny with the Plomo mummy.

In the mid-1950s Stoppelman lived in the Dominican Republic. With help of the Dominican ambassador to the Netherlands, Luis Thomen, his photos were published in the book "Quisqueya, umbral de América". Using the name Francis Stoppelman he published a photobook on Jamaica.

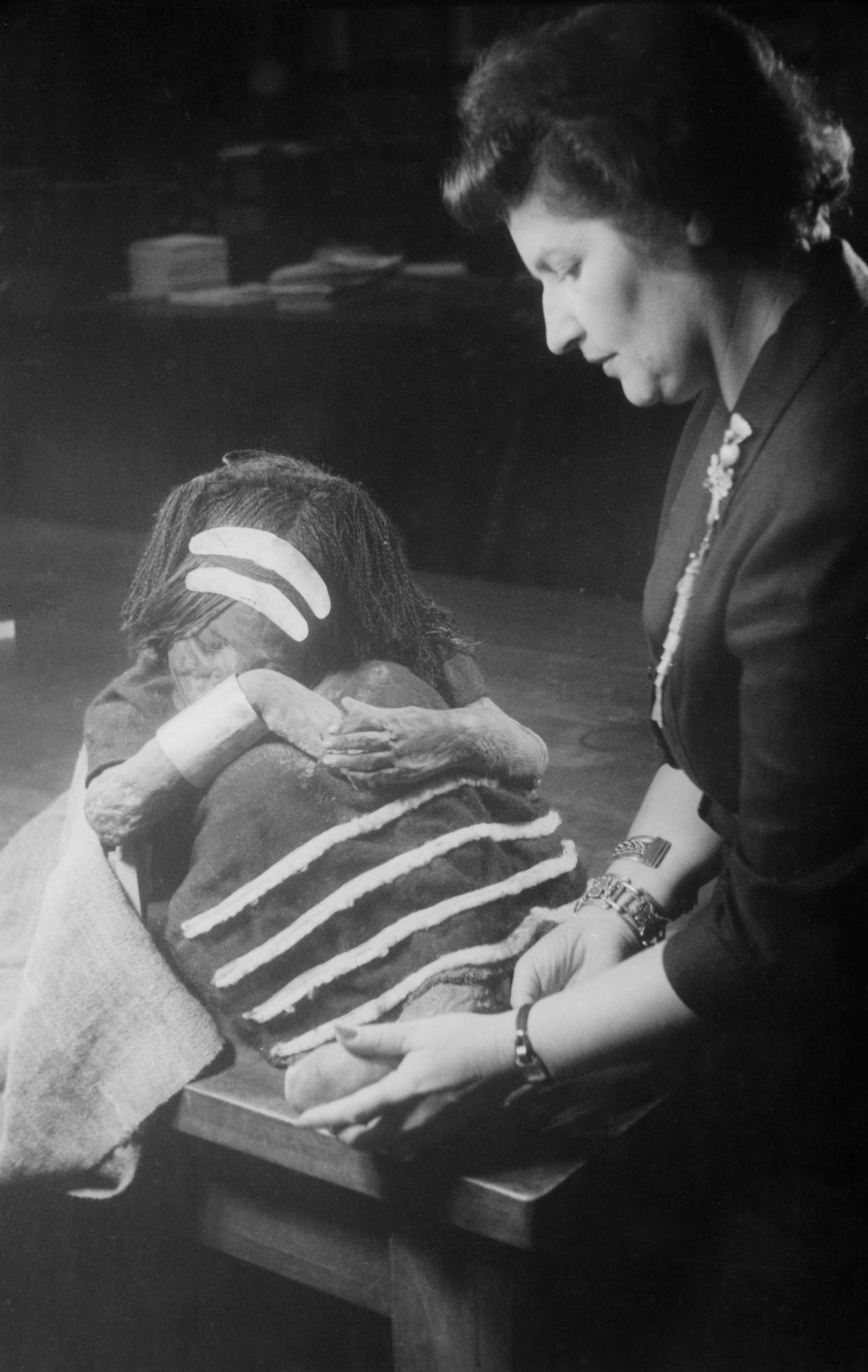
Grete Mostny and the Plomo mummy

=== Mexico ===
In 1968 Stoppelman travelled to Mexico to cover the Olympic Summer Games. His photo of the girl lighting the Olympic Flame won the first prize in the contest for best colour photo of the Games. His name was established in Mexico where he stayed until his death. In 1977 Stoppelman obtained third place in the category humour of the World Press Photo contest. Stoppelman was a great fan of the circus. He was honorary member of circus Atayde.

== Works ==
Stoppelman's work is included in several museum collections, such as the Rijksmuseum, the Joods Historisch Museum, the National Historical Museum of Chile and the Jamaica National Library.

=== Books ===
- Jamaica (Ernest Benn, London 1962)
- La República Dominicana. Quisqueya, umbral de América (1959), with a foreword by Luis F. Thomen.
- Mexico en movimiento (Nederlandse Rotogravure Maatschappij, Leiden 1970), with a foreword by Salvador Novo
- Zo zit dat (Amsterdam 1979), also published in English as How 's that? and in Spanish as Eso es

=== Articles ===
- Photography in the mountains
- El rodeo chileno (in: Sciences et voyages no. 133, January 1957)

=== Awards ===
- Best colour photo of the Olympic Summer Games 1968
- Third Place, Category Humour, World Press Photo 1977
