= Royal Brinkman =

Dutch horticulture company

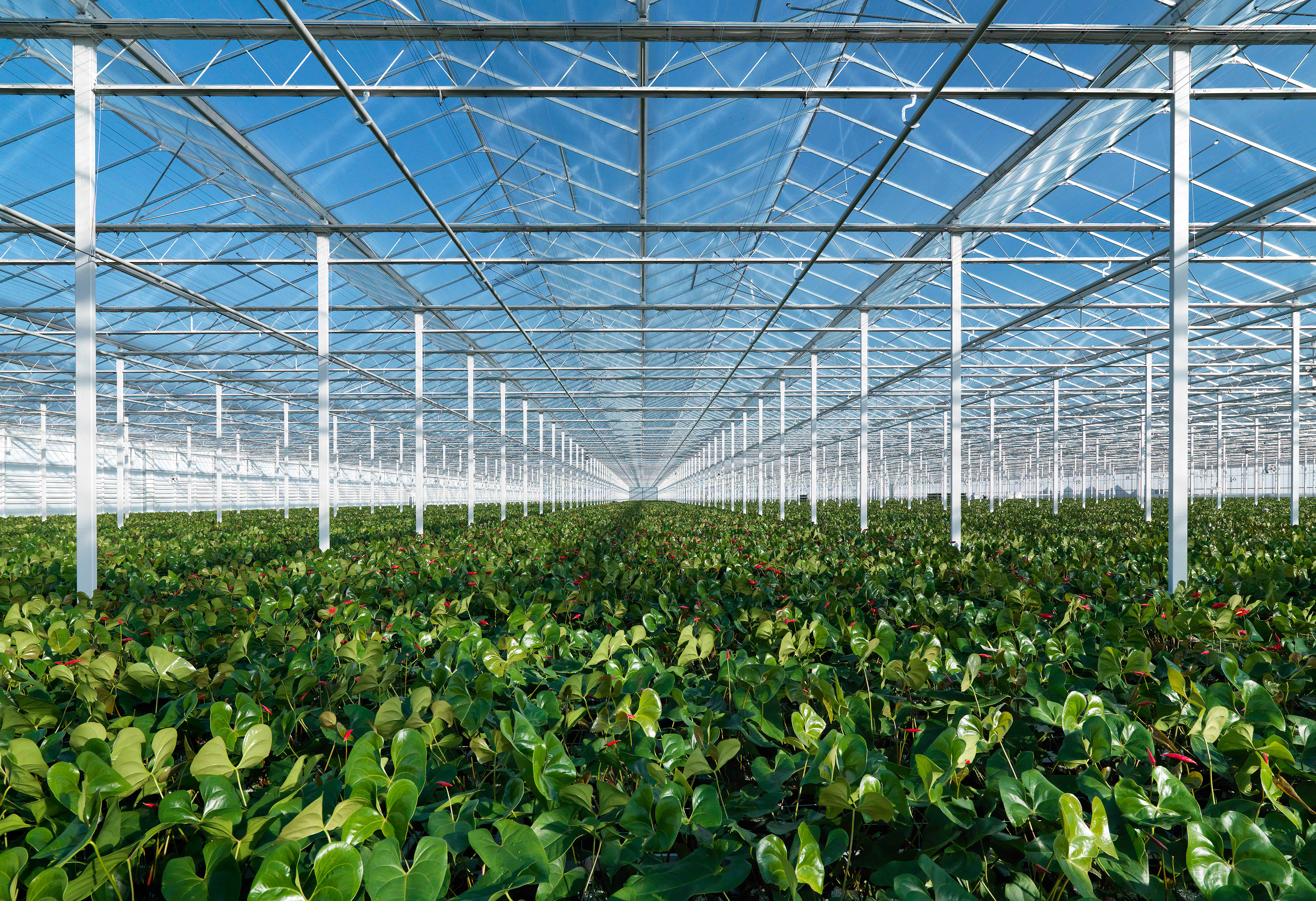
- Type: Private company
- Industry: Horticulture
- Founded: 1885
- Founders: C. Brinkman
- Headquarters: 's-Gravenzande, Netherlands
- Area served: worldwide
- Number of employees: 350 (2017)
- Website: www.royalbrinkman.com

Royal Brinkman is a supplier, installer and consultant for the professional horticultural industry. The company has more than 20 offices with several Dutch offices in: ’s-Gravenzande, Bleiswijk, Roosendaal, Venlo and Gameren. Other offices are based in England, France, Germany, Hungary, Spain, Poland, Turkey, Australia and Mexico. The managing board consists of Ton van Mil (CEO), Gert-Jan van Peer (CFO), Ramon Verdel (CPO), Jan Schuttrups (Commercial Director) and Ronald van der Tang (Operational Director).

== History ==
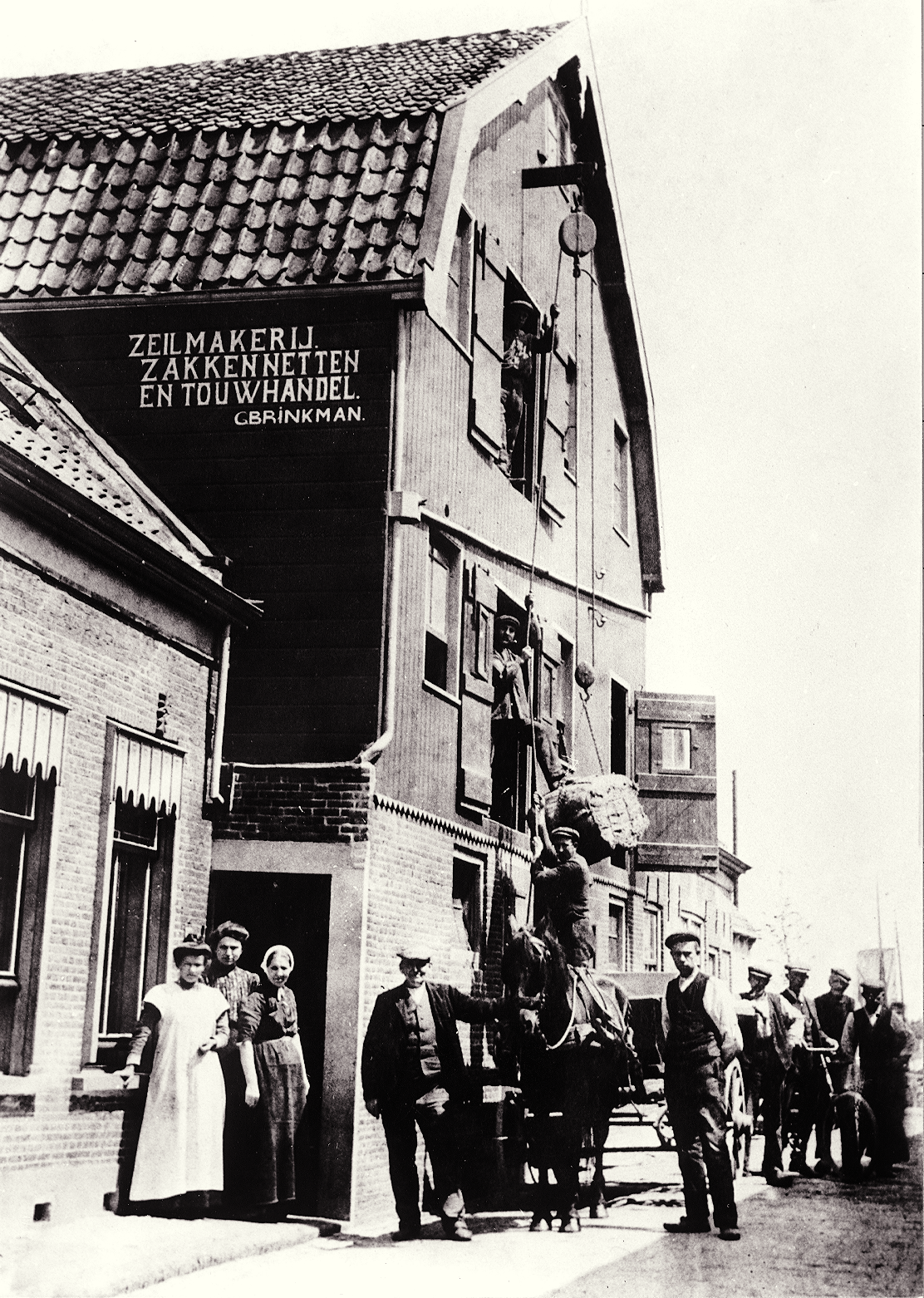
Building at Pepersteeg 1885

Royal Brinkman was founded in 1885 by Cor Brinkman. He started his business at ‘De Pepersteeg’ and visited growers to sell ‘’sparrietouw’’ (a type of rope used for crates and tarpaulins on Westland barges but also for bundling asparagus ). Later he added ‘’kinnetjesnetten and bollenkinnetjes’’ to his assortment. These ropes were knit to nets in Scheveningen, where Cor Brinkman himself brought them. In 1926, Brinkman won 1st prize on the great ‘Fruit and Vegetable exhibition in Utrecht’ with an electric sorting machine for tomatoes, ‘’de doppenmachine’’. This improved version of the ‘’Brinkman Puncher’’ became a huge success. The founders’ son, Henk Brinkman, began hiring personnel. Cor Brinkman started at ‘de Pepersteeg’ (currently Havenstraat) in ’s-Gravenzande. The business grew really fast and moved in 1917 to the Market Place, known as the ‘’Kousenhoek’’. Due to the great success the company had achieved, a new branch was opened in 1931.

During the 2nd World War Brinkman experienced some serious problems. The 1930s were a difficult period for the horticultural industry. On top of that the building in the Market Place was hit by a fierce fire. The car fleet (three trucks), wood stock and machinery were lost. Founder Cor Brinkman’s grandson, Henk Brinkman (3rd generation), started as Managing Director in this difficult period. The nazi’s claimed Brinkman’s property in ’s-Gravenzande, therefore they were forced to move to the wood factory ‘’In ’t Veld en de Jong’’. This new location in De Lier was used as headquarters. After a while, the seizure ended.

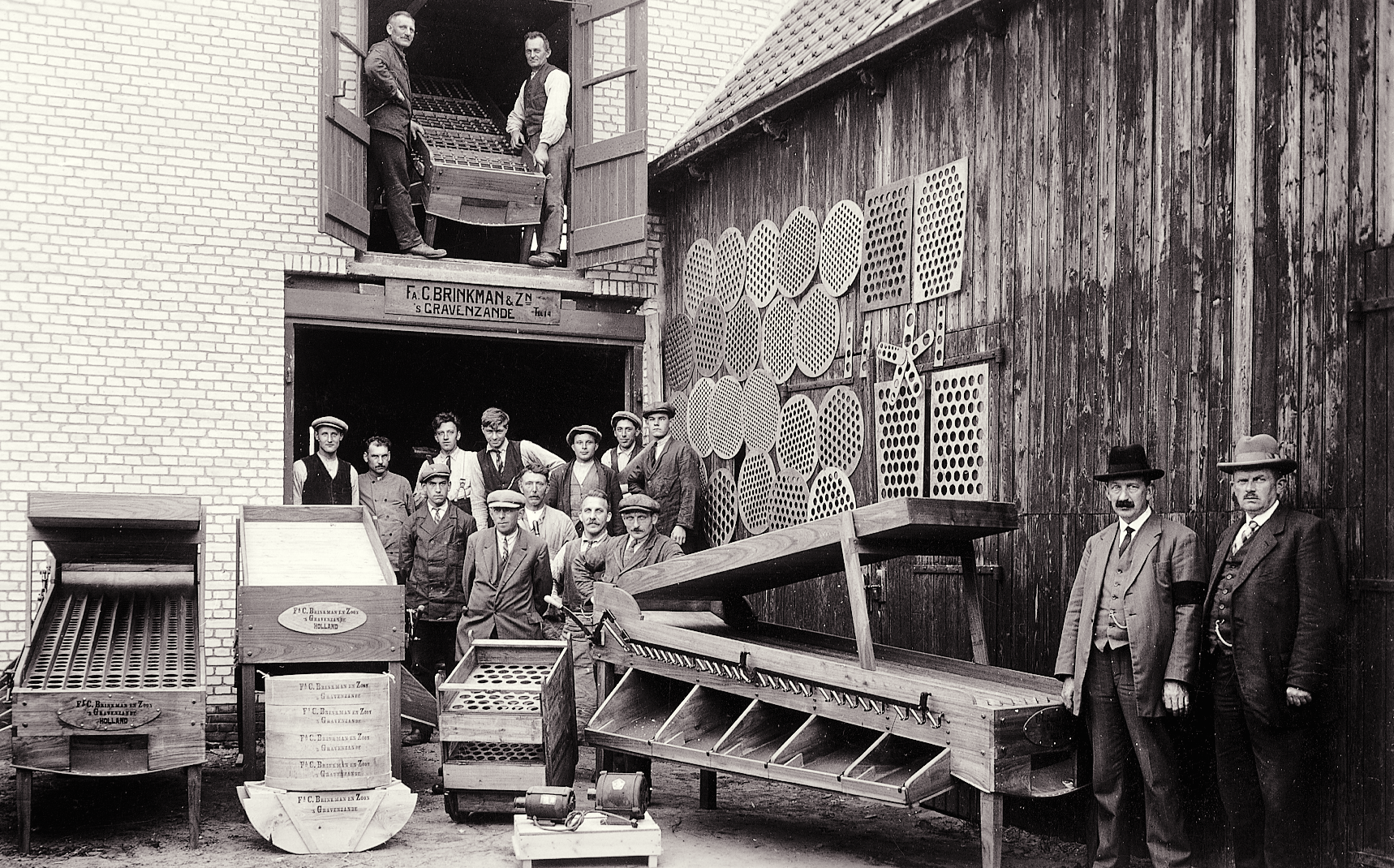
Sorting machine 'Doppenmachine' 1921

During this difficult period Brinkman managed to rebuild everything. The horticultural industry revived after the war because of new growing methods, new crops, automation, irrigation pipes and heating systems. These were glory days for Brinkman. Important developments were the introduction of the Micom 85 horticulture computer (advanced computer which controlled the climate in the greenhouse) and the switch from soil to substrate cultivation. Brinkman initiated the cultivation of tomatoes, carnations and geberas in peat substrate. After that Grodan introduced cultivation on stone wool. Growers experienced a lot of benefits growing above ground, including the prevention of soil diseases, higher revenues, energy savings and surface optimization. Brinkman developed the Vocom, a computer that is able to dose water and fertilizers properly for the cultivation on substrate. These computers were a big hit in the '70s and '80s.

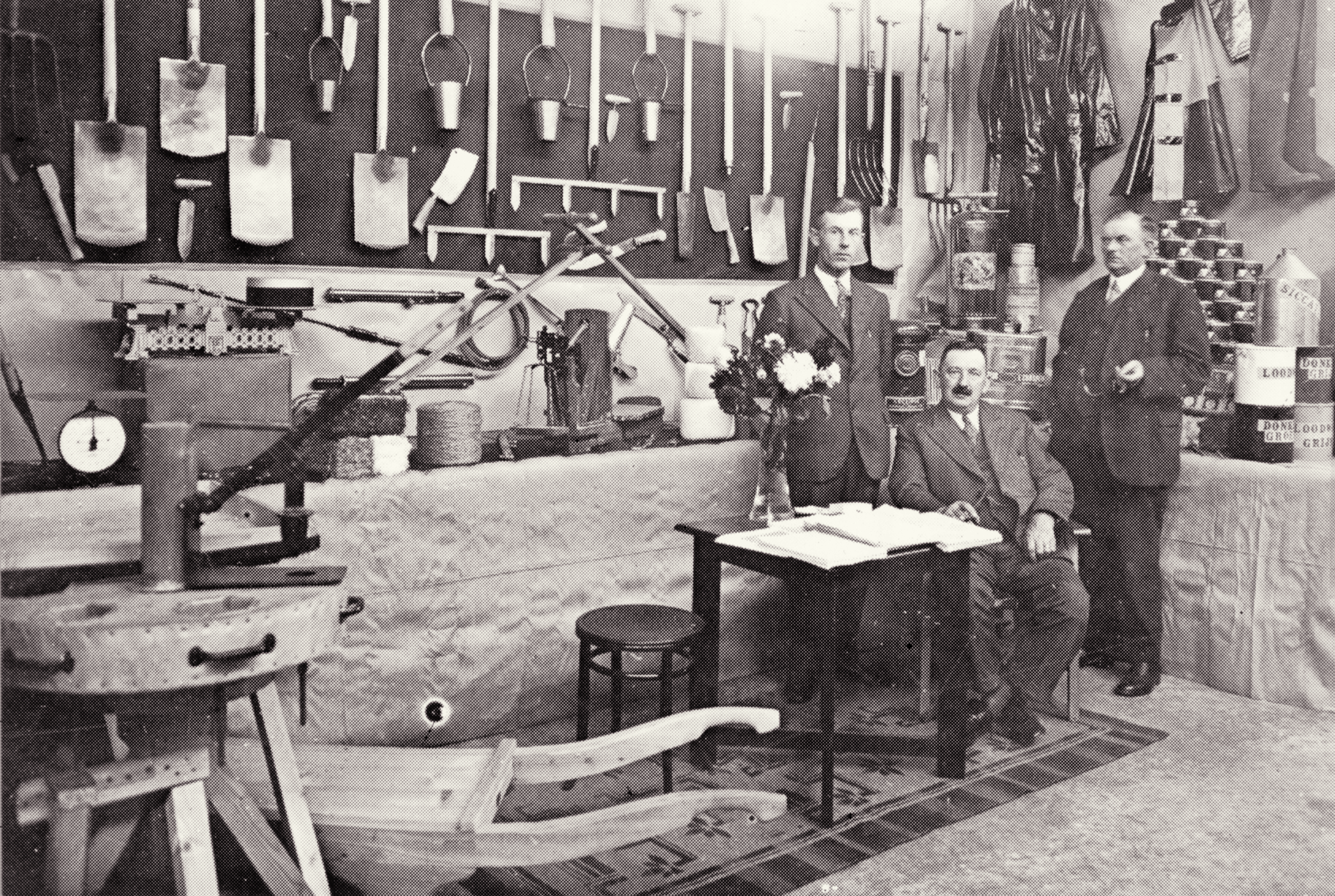
Marketplace 1917

Brinkman moved in 1972 from ‘’Kousenhoek’’ to the former Auction Hall at the Woutersweg in ’s-Gravenzande. The grand opening of the new 45,000 m^{2} property was a huge milestone for Brinkman and for Westland. Within five days more than 11,000 guests visited the new property. The headquarters are still located at the Woutersweg. Increasing demands from abroad led to the first branch in Burstwick, near Hull (UK) in 1972. Brinkman began exporting in 1930, to the UK.

== Predicate ‘Royal’ ==
On April 1, 1985, Brinkman received the ‘’Royal’’ predicate. In the name of the Dutch Queen Beatrix, Brinkman received this predicate for its 100th anniversary. Mies Bouwman awarded this Royal predicate to Cor Brinkman and Henk Brinkman. Elco Brinkman, at the time minister of the Dutch Government, congratulated Henk and Cor Brinkman personally (no family connection).

== Timeline ==
- 1885 – Cor Brinkman founded Brinkman at ‘’Pepersteeg’’
- 1917 – Brinkman moves to Market Place in ’s-Gravenzande
- 1919 – Purchase of the first company car, T-Ford
- 1923 – Purchase of the first truck
- 1926 – ‘’Doppenmachine’’ wins first prize at the Fruit and Vegetable exhibition Utrecht
- 1931 – Grand opening first branch Rockanje
- 1934 – Fierce fire in headquarters at Market Place in ’s-Gravenzande
- 1940 – 1945 – Forced to move to De Lier
- 1972 – Brinkman moves to the property of the former Vegetable Auction Hall
- 1974 – Opening first branch abroad in Burstwick, United Kingdom
- 1975 – Launch of the first climate computer Micom 85
- 1979 – Launch of the first nutrition computer Vocom
- 1985 – Brinkman receives ‘’Royal’’ predicate for 100th anniversary from the Dutch Queen Beatrix
- 1989 – Royal Brinkman wins Horticulture Entrepreneur Prize
- 2010 – Extension of ‘’Royal’’ predicate for 25 years – till 2035
- 2012 – Headquarters located in one building at Woutersweg ’s-Gravenzande
- 2015 – Introduction of new logo Royal Brinkman
- 2016 – Royal Brinkman is nominated for Horticulture Entrepreneur Prize 2016
- 2016 – 1st prize TASPO Awards for best webshop
