= Simon Pereyns =

Flemish painter

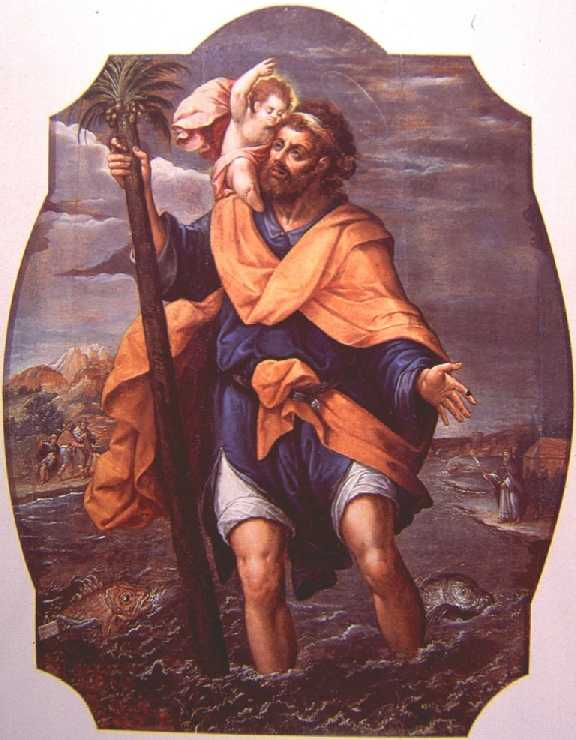
Saint Christopher at Cathedral of Mexico, 1588.

Simon Pereyns (c. 1530–1600) was a Flemish painter. He moved to Lisbon, Portugal in 1558 and later to Madrid, Spain. In 1566, he moved to Mexico where he gained fame as a painter of numerous works, most of which have not survived. He created the altarpiece of Huejotzingo at the Franciscan convent of Huejotzingo in Puebla, Mexico, one of the monasteries on the slopes of Popocatépetl. Included in his works is a depiction of Saint Christopher.

His most important work was probably the Virgin of Forgiveness that formed the centerpiece of the Altar of Forgiveness at the Mexico City Metropolitan Cathedral. This work, along with the altar, was destroyed during a fire in 1967. This painting is the origin of various legends. According to one, the altar received its name because Pereyns, while in jail accused of blasphemy, painted a beautiful image of the Virgin Mary, whereby he earned forgiveness. Another spurious legend attributed this painting to an unknown master working at the behest of a Jewish patron. This patron supposedly commissioned the painting to give himself the pleasure of hanging it in his horse stable. Documentary evidence shows that the Virgin of Forgiveness was indeed painted by Pereyns. The painting was the price he had to pay after his trial by the Inquisition. After he was deposed and tortured by the Inquisition, he was ordered to paint a Virgin de los Remedios for the cathedral. This painting later became known as the Virgin of Forgiveness.
