= Canary Islanders =

People of the Canary Islands

Canary Islanders Canarios
Regions with significant populations
- Canary Islands: 1,535,934 (2025); 68% of the total Canary Islands population

Significant Canary Islander diaspora in
- Venezuela: 62,000
- Cuba: 65,000
- Argentina: 2,390
- Mexico: 1,600

Languages
- Canarian Spanish, Silbo Gomero

Religion
- Roman Catholicism (76.7%)

Related ethnic groups
- Isleños, other Spaniards, Madeirans, Portuguese, Berbers (Guanches)

Canary Islanders, or Canarians (Spanish: canarios), are the people of the Canary Islands, an autonomous community of Spain near the coast of the Maghreb. The distinctive variety of the Spanish language spoken in the region is known as habla canaria (Canary speech) or as the (dialecto) canario (Canarian dialect). The Canarians, and their descendants, played major roles during the conquest, colonization, and eventual independence movements of various Latin American countries. The Canarians' ethnic and cultural presence are most palpable in Cuba, the Dominican Republic, Puerto Rico, Uruguay, and Venezuela.

== History ==
The original inhabitants of the Canary Islands are commonly known as Guanches (although this term, in its strict sense, refers only to the Indigenous inhabitants of Tenerife). They are most probably descendants of the Berbers of Morocco and Algeria.

At the beginning of the 15th century, the Canary Islands were conquered by Castile. In 1402, the Castilians began to subdue and suppress the Indigenous Guanche population. The Guanches were initially enslaved and gradually absorbed. As a result, genetic analyses of modern Canarians show mainly a mixture of predominant European and North African genes, with low frequencies of sub-Saharan genes, sometimes with substantial variation between individuals (see Ancestry).

Following subsequent European settlement, the remaining Guanches were gradually assimilated by the settlers and their culture largely vanished. Alonso Fernández de Lugo, conqueror of Tenerife and La Palma, oversaw extensive European immigration to these two islands during a short period (from the late 1490s to the 1520s). At subsequent judicial enquiries, Fernández de Lugo was accused of favoring Genoese and Portuguese immigrants over Castilians.

== Ancestry ==
The overall genome of the Canary Islands shows a major Iberian contribution (62–78%), a substantial Maghrebian contribution (23–38%), and a minor sub-Saharan African input (3%). In the maternal line (mitochondrial DNA), the Iberian contribution drops to between 48% and 55% – Guanche mothers heavily influenced early interbreeding, accounting for about half of the maternal line. In contrast, the paternal line (Y Chromosome) is overwhelmingly Iberian, ranging from 83% to more than 90%.

While early immigrants from South Europe and North Africa shaped the base population of the Canary Islands, the dominant Iberian genetic ancestry was primarily Portuguese—best illustrated by surnames—followed by Galicians and Andalusians, although the latter exerted the most profound impact on the emerging dialect. This was largely because, from the late-15th century onward, the Port of Seville served as the mandatory transit point for all migrants departing for the Canary Islands (under the Spanish Crown).

=== Population genetics ===
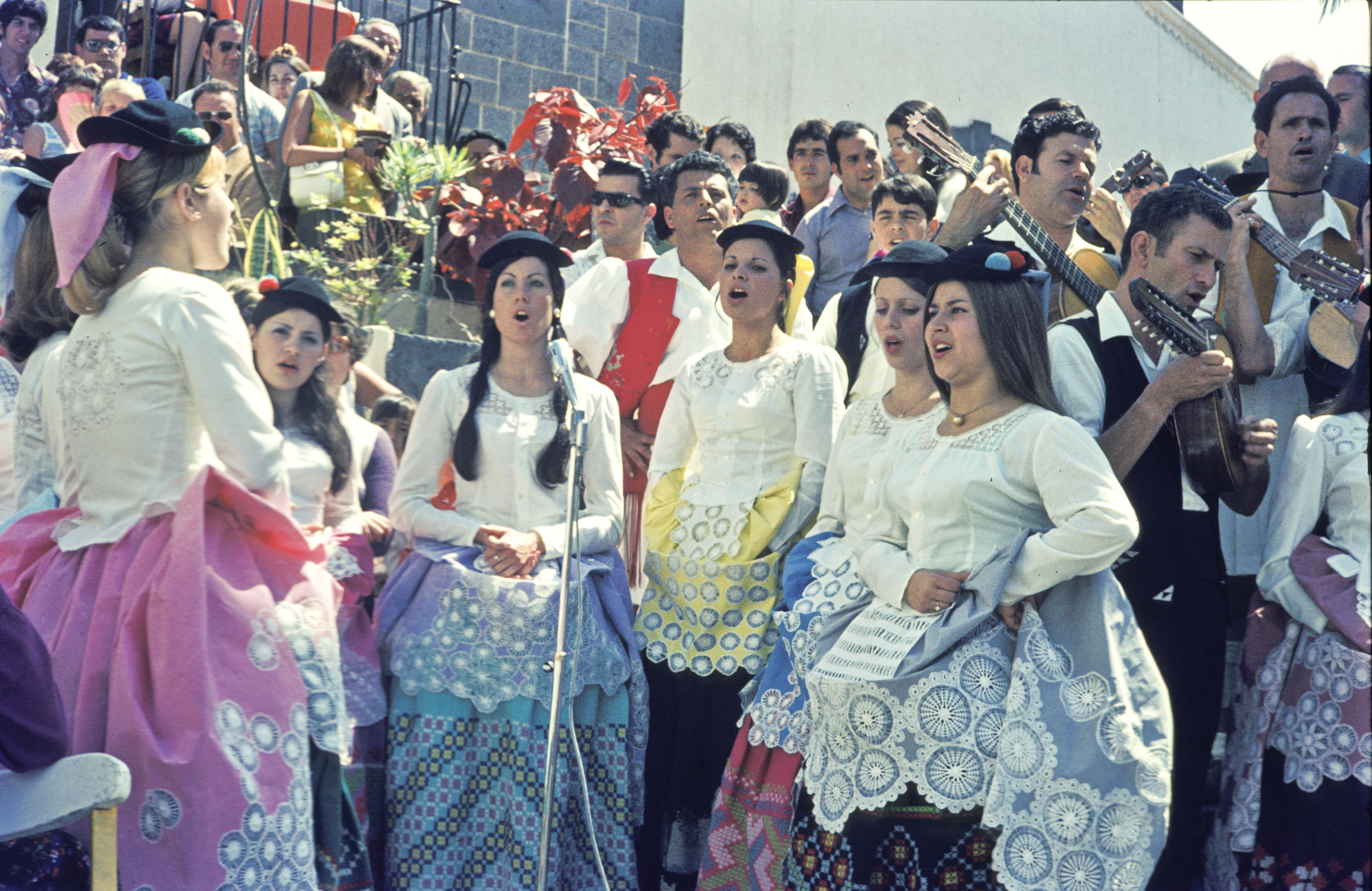
Canarians singing in Gran Canaria 1972.

==== Uniparental markers ====
The most frequent (maternal-descent) mtDNA haplogroup in Canary Islands is H (37.6%), followed by U6 (14.0%), T (12.7%), not-U6 U (10.3%) and J (7.0%). Haplogroups H and U6 account for more than 50% of the individuals. Frequencies of sub-Saharan maternal L haplogroups (6.6%) are also consistent with the historical records on introduction of sub-Saharan female slave labour on the Canary Islands. However, small percentages of sub-Saharan female lineages can also be found in certain North African populations (see: Trans-Saharan slave trade), and as a result, some of these L lineages could have been introduced to the Islands from the Maghreb. A 2009 study of DNA extracted from the remains of the Canary Islands' Indigenous inhabitants found that 7% of lineages were haplogroup L, which leaves open the possibility that these L lineages were part of the founding populations of the Canary Islands. Sub-Saharan female lineages have been found in frequencies of 10% or more on some of the Canary Islands.

A 2003 genetics research article by Nicole Maca-Meyer et al. published in the European Journal of Human Genetics compared aboriginal Guanche mtDNA (collected from Canarian archaeological sites) to that of today's Canarians and concluded that "despite the continuous changes suffered by the population (Spanish colonization, slave trade), aboriginal mtDNA lineages constitute a considerable proportion [42–73%] of the Canarian gene pool". According to this article, both percentages are obtained using two different estimation methods; nevertheless, according to the same study, the percentage that could be more reliable is the one of 73%.

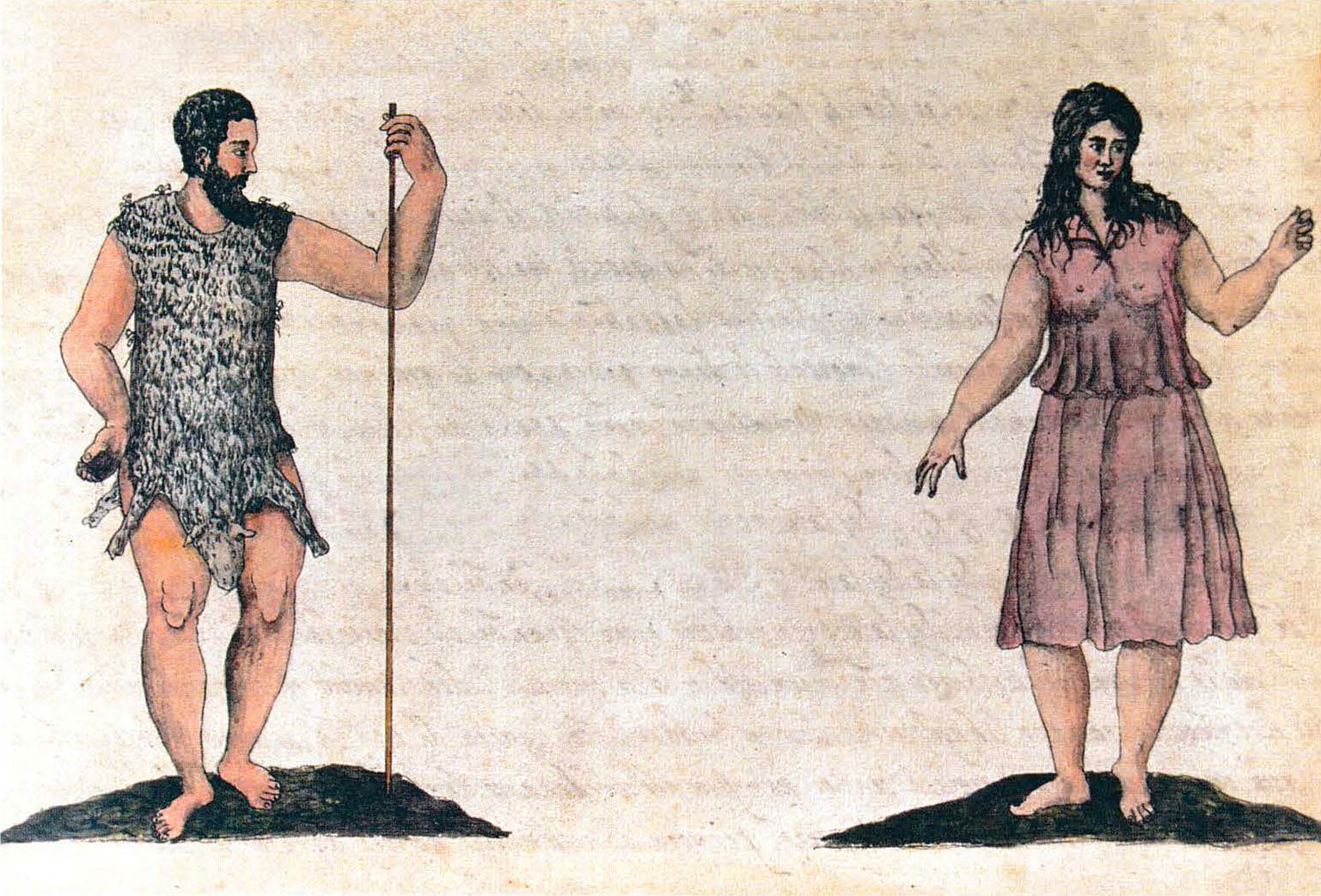
Painting of Bimbache of El Hierro by Leonardo Torriani, 1592

Although the Berbers are the most probable ancestors of the Guanches, it is deduced that important human movements (e.g., the Islamic-Arabic conquest of the Berbers) have reshaped Northwest Africa after the migratory wave to the Canary Islands. The "results support, from a maternal perspective, the supposition that since the end of the 16th century, at least, two-thirds of the Canarian population had an Indigenous substrate, as was previously inferred from historical and anthropological data". mtDNA haplogroup U subclade U6b1 is a Canarian-specific, localized branch of the U6b halogroup (Mediterranean Northwest Africa).

A 2019 genetics research article states that most lineages observed in the ancient samples have a Mediterranean distribution, and belong to lineages associated with the Neolithic expansion in the Near East and Europe (T, J, X...). The first of its kind, this phylogeographic analysis of Canarian ancient mitogenomes shows that "some lineages are restricted to central North Africa (H1cf, J2a2d and T2c1d3), while others have wider distributions, including the West North Africa and Central North Africa (both parts of the Maghreb), and, in some cases, Europe, and the Near East (U6a1a1, U6a7a1, U6b, X3a, U6c1)."

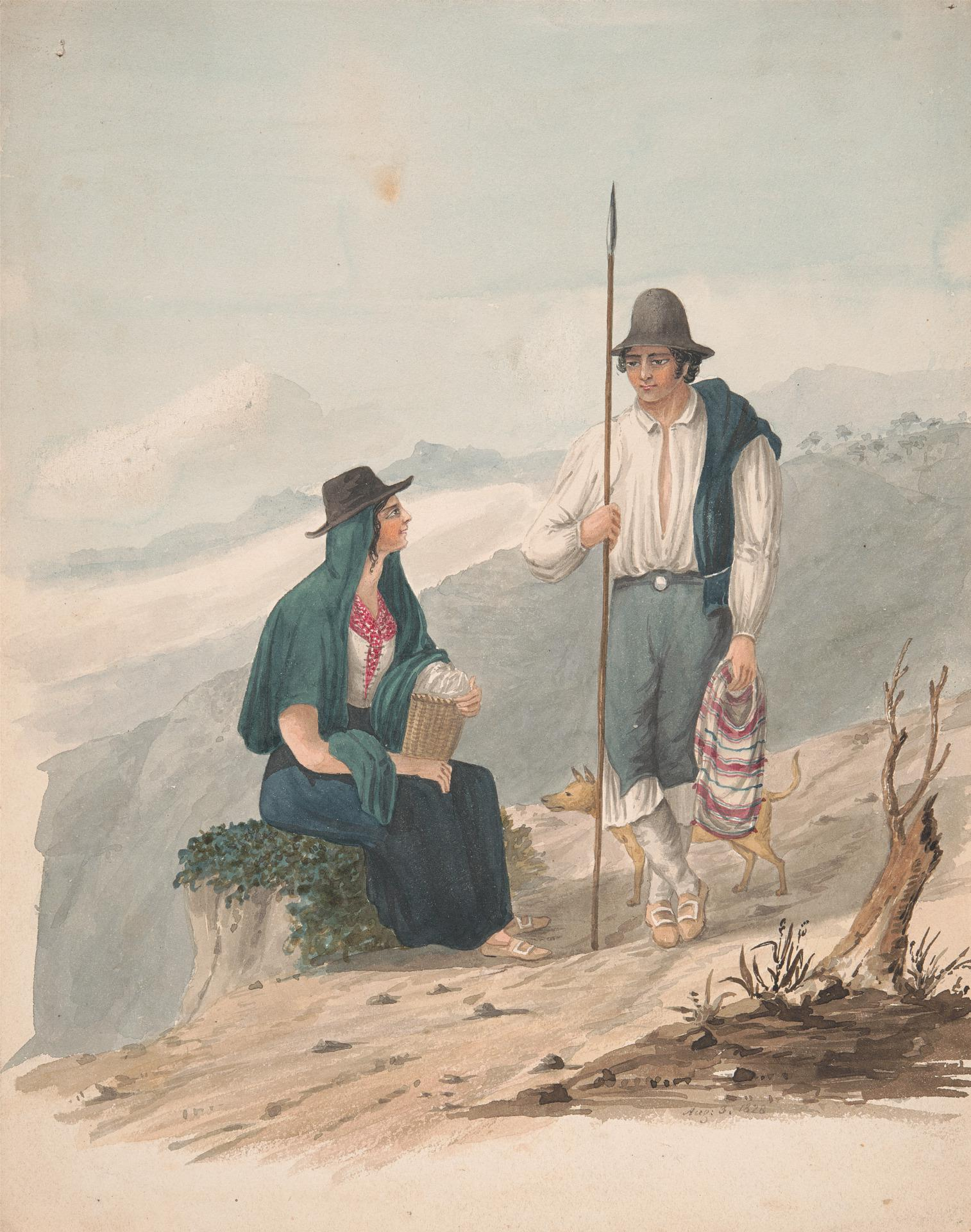
Canary Islanders in Tenerife, by Alfred Diston, 1828

Y-DNA, or Y-chromosomal, (direct paternal) lineages were not analysed in this study; however, an earlier study giving the aboriginal y-DNA contribution at 6% was cited by Maca-Meyer et al., but the results were criticized as possibly flawed due to the widespread phylogeography of y-DNA haplogroup E1b1b1b, which may skew determination of the aboriginality versus coloniality of contemporary y-DNA lineages in the Canaries. Regardless, Maca-Meyer et al. state that historical evidence does support the explanation of "strong sexual asymmetry...as a result of a strong bias favoring matings between European males and aboriginal females, and to the important aboriginal male mortality during the Conquest".

According to a 2009 study by Fregel et al., the genetic ancestry of the Canary islands' males is mainly of European origin. Nearly 67% of the haplogroups resulting from are Euro-Eurasian (R1a (2.76%), R1b (50.62%), J (14%), I (9.66%) and G (3.99%)). Unsurprisingly, the Castilian conquest brought the genetic base of the current male population of the Canary Islands. Nevertheless, the second most important haplogroup origin is North African. E1b1b (14% including 8.30% of the typical Berber haplogroup E-M81), E1b1a and E1a (1.50%), and T (3%) haplogroups are present at a rate of 33%. According to the same study, the presence of autochthonous North African E-M81 lineages, and also other relatively abundant markers (E-M78 and J-M267) from the same region in the Indigenous Guanche population, "strongly points to that area [North Africa] as the most probable origin of the Guanche ancestors". In this study, Fregel et al. estimated that, based on Y-chromosome and mtDNA haplogroup frequencies, the relative female and male indigenous Guanche contributions to the present-day Canary Islands populations were respectively of 41.8% and 16.1%.

=== Mitochondrial DNA ===
A genetic study analyzing the modern-day Canarian population showed a prevalence of European maternal lineages in Canary Islanders followed by Northwest African ancestry in all Islands except La Gomera:

Island/NW African mtDNA	Sample size	% U6	% L	Total
La Gomera	46	50.01 %	10.86 %	60.87 %
El Hierro	32	21.88 %	12.49 %	34.37 %
Lanzarote	49	20.40 %	8.16 %	28.56 %
Gran Canaria	80	11.25 %	10 %	21.25 %
Tenerife	174	12.09 %	7.45 %	19.54 %
La Palma	68	17.65 %	1.47 %	19.12 %
Fuerteventura	42	16.66 %	2.38 %	19.04 %

A mithocondrial DNA analysis of ancient, around 1000 years old, Guanche remains indirectly estimated the current maternal Northwest African lineage to be higher than European:

MtDNA	North African	European	Sub Saharan
Canary Islands	50.2%	43.2%	6.6%

A mithocondrial DNA study that analyzed the teeth of the XVIII century Canary Islanders showed more presence of Northwest African maternal ancestry than European:

MtDNA	North African	European	Sub Saharan
Canary Islands	73%	21.5%	5.5%

==== Autosomal DNA ====
An autosomal study in 2011 found an average Northwest African influence of about 17% in Canary Islanders with a wide interindividual variation ranging from 0% to 96%. According to the authors, the substantial Northwest African ancestry found for Canary Islanders supports that, despite the aggressive conquest by Castile in the 15th century and the subsequent immigration, genetic footprints of the first settlers of the Canary Islands persist in the current inhabitants. Paralleling mtDNA findings, the largest average Northwest African contribution was found for the samples from La Gomera.

Island	N	Average NW African ancestry
La Gomera	7	42.50 %
Fuerteventura	10	21.60 %
La Palma	7	21.00 %
El Hierro	7	19.80 %
Lanzarote	13	16.40 %
Tenerife	30	14.30 %
Gran Canaria	30	12.40 %
Total Canary Islanders	104	17.40 %

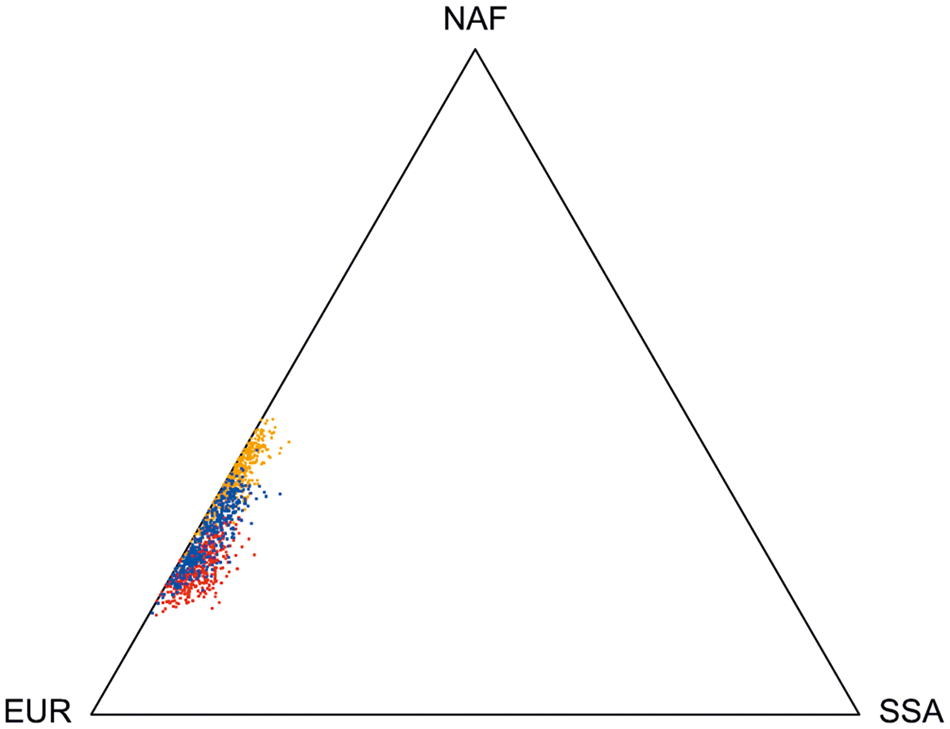
Triangle plot of individual genomic admixture proportions in Canary Islanders by Guillen-Guio et al. 2018. EUR: European, NAF: North African, SSA: sub-Saharan African. Each dots represent individuals. The different colors represent the different software used for the estimation.

Another study by Guillen-Guio et al. 2018 sequenced the entire genomes of a sample of 400 adult men and women from all the islands except La Graciosa to determine the relationship of Canarian genetic diversity to the more frequent complex pathologies in the archipelago. The study indicated that Canarian DNA shows distinctive genetic markers, the result of a combination of factors such as the geographic isolation of the islands, the adaption to the environment of its inhabitants and the historic admixture of the Pre-Hispanic population of the archipelago (coming from North Africa), with European and from Sub-Saharan area individuals. Drawing on these data, it was estimated that the Canarian population is, on average at an autosomal level, 75% European, 22% North African and 3% Sub-Saharan. According to the authors "the proportion of SSA ancestry we observed in Canary Islanders likely originated in the postconquest importation of enslaved African people.". This study reported the below Genomic Ancestry Proportions in Canary Islanders.

Genomic ancestry proportions in Canary Islanders
Island	North African			Sub-Saharan African		
Island	Min.	Mean	Max.	Min.	Mean	Max.
Fuerteventura	0.218	0.255	0.296	0.011	0.027	0.046
Lanzarote	0.214	0.254	0.296	0.014	0.032	0.057
Gran Canaria	0.155	0.200	0.264	0.005	0.032	0.082
Tenerife	0.149	0.208	0.255	0.002	0.015	0.057
La Gomera	0.160	0.221	0.289	0.013	0.048	0.092
La Palma	0.170	0.200	0.245	0.000	0.013	0.032
El Hierro	0.192	0.246	0.299	0.005	0.020	0.032

Source: Genomic Ancestry Proportions (from ADMIXTURE, K-4) in Canary Islanders (Guillen-Guio et al. 2018)

In addition, a study by Díaz-de Usera et al. 2022 that analyzed 863 donors of all the islands (105 from El Hierro, 93 from La Palma, 141 from La Gomera, 156 from Tenerife, 210 from Gran Canaria, 47 from Fuerteventura, and 111 from Lanzarote) suggested two different results depending on the model used. One of them evaluated the global ancestry of the subjects, indicating an ancestry on an autosomal level of 76,4% European, 20,8% North African, and 2,8% Sub-Saharan. However, when a specific model to evaluate the ancestry of admixed populations was used, this showed that the autosomal DNA of Canarian people is 71,4% European, 26,7% North African, and 1,9% Sub-Saharan, being the highest North African and Sub-Saharan components at an individual level 38,2% and 9,5% respectively.

	European	North African	Sub-Saharan
El Hierro	68,3%	31,0%	0,7%
La Palma	76,5%	22,4%	1,1%
La Gomera	65,8%	31,0%	3,2%
Tenerife	75,3%	23,6%	1,1%
Gran Canaria	73,7%	23,6%	2,7%
Fuerteventura	67,2%	31,1%	1,7%
Lanzarote	67,1%	30,9%	2,0%

=== Ancient Canarians ===
The Guanches are related to the indigenous Berbers. In 2017, the first genome-wide data from the Guanches confirmed a North African origin and that they were genetically most similar to ancient North African Berber peoples of the nearby North African mainland. It also showed that modern inhabitants of Gran Canaria carry an estimated 16%–31% Guanche autosomal ancestry.

== Culture ==
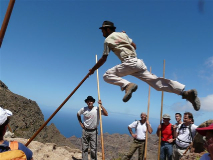
Shepherd's leap

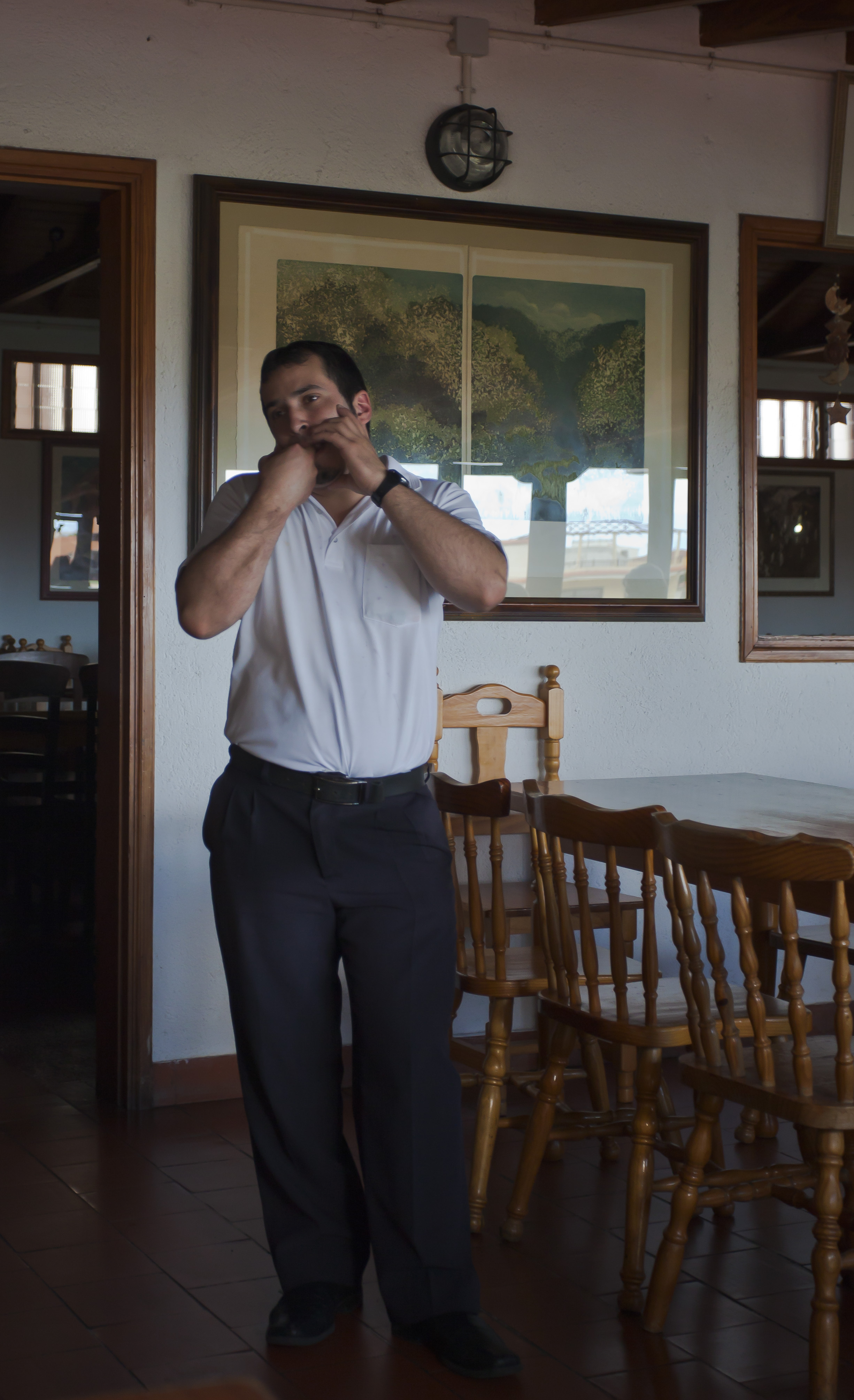
Silbo Gomero demonstration at a restaurant in La Gomera

Modern-day Canarian culture is Spanish, with some Guanche influences. Some of the Canarian traditional sports such as lucha canaria ("Canarian fight"), juego del palo ("stick game") or salto del pastor ("shepherd's jump"), among others, have their roots in Guanche culture. Additionally, other traditions include Canarian pottery, words of Guanche origin in the Canarian speech and the rural consumption of guarapo gomero and gofio. The inhabitants of La Gomera also retain an ancient way of communicating across deep ravines by means of a whistled speech called Silbo Gomero, which can be heard up to 3 km (2 miles) away. This indigenous whistled language was invented by the Guanches, and was then adopted by the Spanish settlers in the 16th century after the Guanches were culturally assimilated into the population. The language was also formerly spoken on El Hierro, Tenerife and Gran Canaria.

The holidays celebrated in the Canary Islands are of international, national and regional or insular character. The official day of the autonomous community is Canary Islands Day on 30 May. The anniversary of the first session of the Parliament of the Canary Islands, based in the city of Santa Cruz de Tenerife, held on 30 May 1983, is commemorated with this day. The most famous festival of the Canary Islands is the carnival. The carnival is celebrated in all the islands and all its municipalities, perhaps the two busiest being those of the two Canarian capitals; the Carnival of Santa Cruz de Tenerife (Tourist Festival of International Interest) and the Carnival of Las Palmas de Gran Canaria. It is celebrated on the streets between the months of February and March. But the rest of the islands of the archipelago have their carnivals with their own traditions among which stand out: The Festival of the Carneros of El Hierro, the Festival of the Diabletes of Teguise in Lanzarote, Los Indianos de La Palma, the Carnival of San Sebastián de La Gomera and the Carnival of Puerto del Rosario in Fuerteventura.

The strong influence of Latin America in Canarian culture is due to the constant emigration and return over the centuries of Canarians to that continent, chiefly to Puerto Rico, Cuba, the Dominican Republic, and Venezuela. To a lesser extent, they also went to the US states of Louisiana (mostly the southern portion) and Texas (mostly in and around San Antonio), and some areas in eastern Mexico including Nuevo León and Veracruz.

=== Canarian Spanish ===
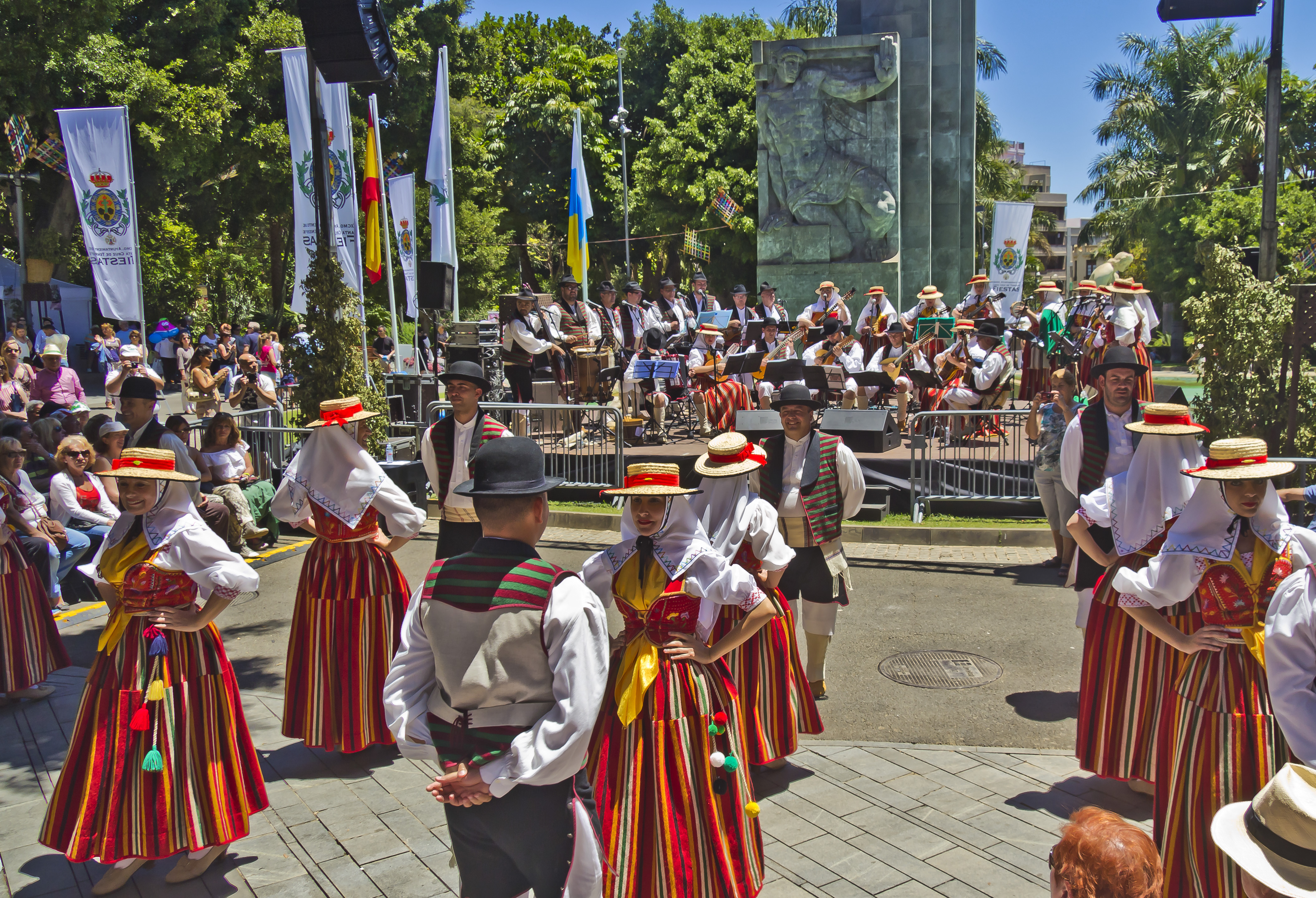
Folklore group in traditional clothing in Tenerife

The Spanish language variety that is typical and conventional in the Canary Islands is usually called the Canarian Spanish, Canarian dialect or Canarian speech, and is used by the approximately two million Spanish speakers who live in the Canary Islands. It is a dialect variety that falls within what has been called the "Atlantic variety", similar to those of Spanish-speaking America, and also to those of the south of the Iberian Peninsula, especially western Andalusia.

The dialect most similar to the Canarian dialect, given the historical link between both areas, is the Caribbean dialect, spoken in Cuba, Puerto Rico, Hispaniola (Dominican Republic), and the coast of the Caribbean Sea (Venezuela, northern Colombia, and Panama). In addition, lexically, the Canarian dialect is widely influenced by the Portuguese language, from which a certain part of its lexicon is derived.

=== Religion ===
==== Catholic Church ====
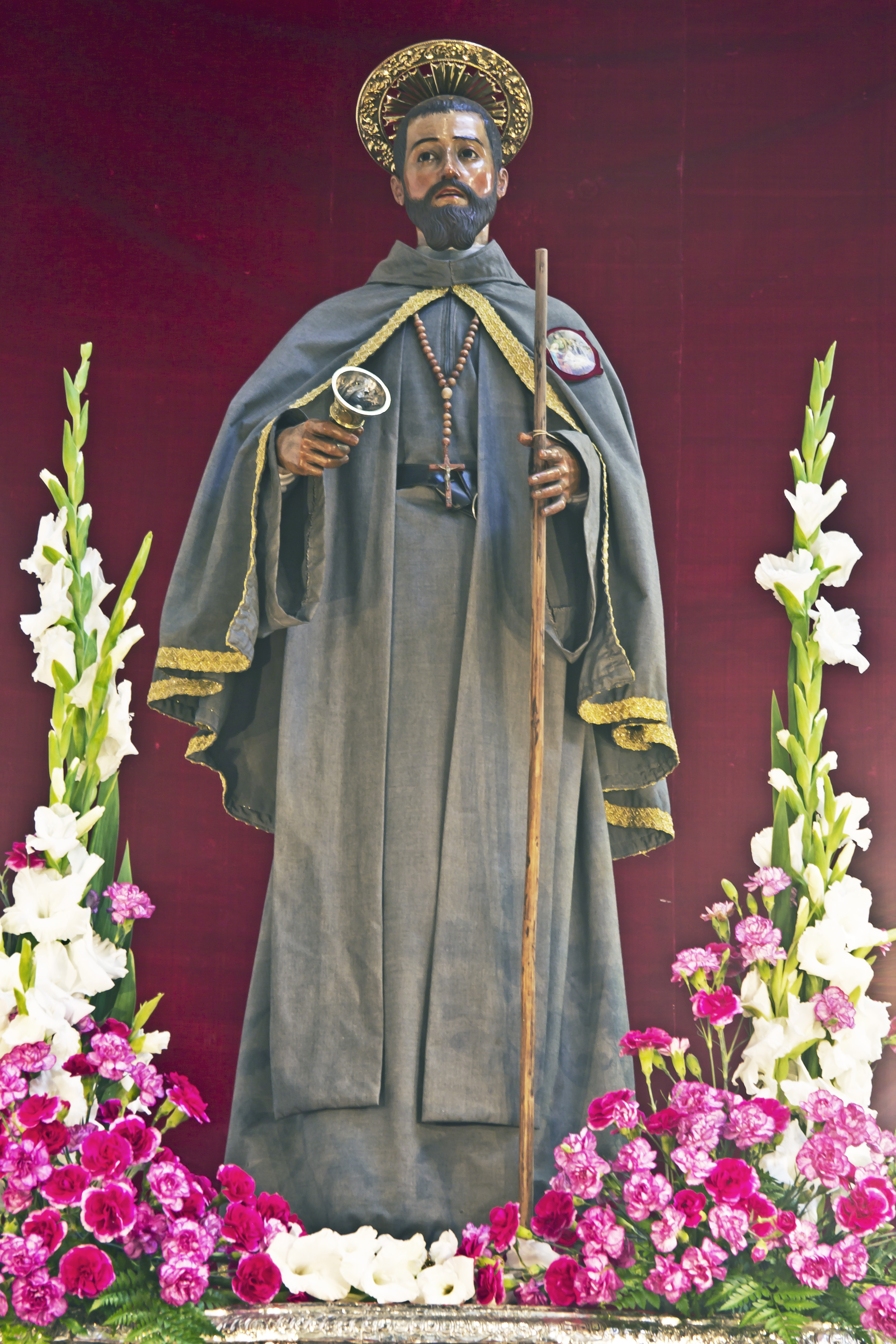
Peter of Saint Joseph de Betancur, the first Canarian catholic saint

The majority of native Canary Islanders are Catholic with various smaller foreign-born populations of other Christian beliefs such as Protestants from northern Europe.

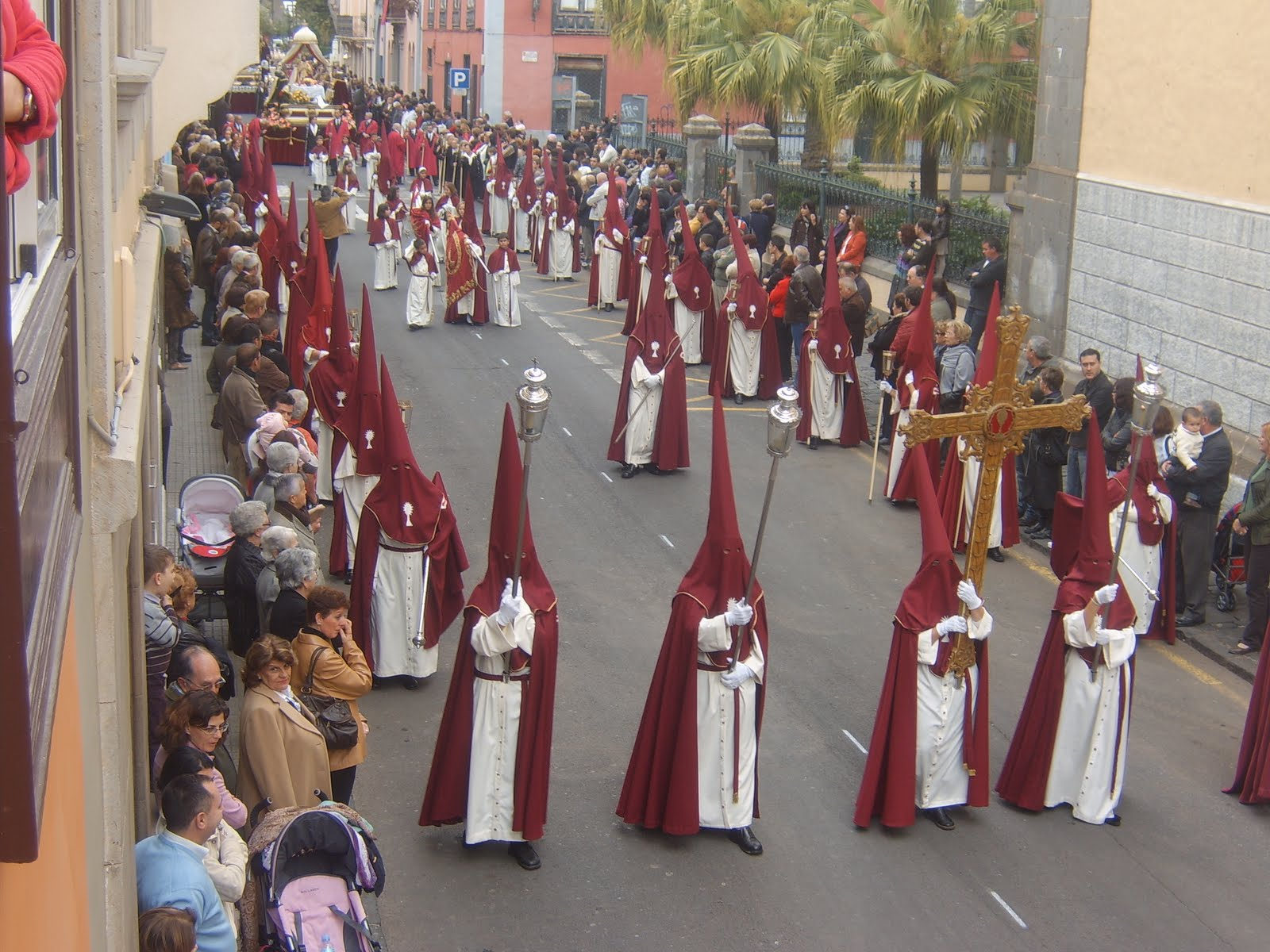
Procession of Holy Week in San Cristóbal de La Laguna

The appearance of the Virgin of Candelaria (Patron of Canary Islands) was credited with moving the Canary Islands toward Christianity. In this sense, it is also important to highlight the figure of Saint Peter of Saint Joseph de Betancur, a missionary in Guatemala in the 17th century, who is the first saint of Canarian origin. Another saint venerated by the Catholic Church with this ethnic origin is Saint Joseph of Anchieta, also a missionary, in this case in 16th century Brazil.

The Canary Islands are divided into two Catholic dioceses, each governed by a bishop:

- Diócesis Canariense: Includes the islands of the Eastern Province: Gran Canaria, Fuerteventura and Lanzarote. Its capital was San Marcial El Rubicón (1404) and Las Palmas de Gran Canaria (1483–present). There was a previous bishopric which was based in Telde, but it was later abolished.
- Diócesis Nivariense: Includes the islands of the western province: Tenerife, La Palma, La Gomera, and El Hierro. Its capital is San Cristóbal de La Laguna (1819–present).

==== Other religions ====
Around 5 percent of Canarians belong to a minority religion. Separate from the overwhelming Christian majority are a minority of Muslims who are usually foreign-born. At present, there are in the Canary Islands a figure of approximately 70,000 Muslims and 40 mosques and places of worship throughout the archipelago.

Among the followers of Islam, the Islamic Federation of the Canary Islands exists to represent the Islamic community in the Canary Islands as well as to provide practical support to members of the Islamic community. For its part, there is also the Evangelical Council of the Canary Islands in the archipelago.

Other religious faiths represented include Jehovah's Witnesses, The Church of Jesus Christ of Latter-day Saints as well as Hinduism. Minority religions are also present such as the Church of the Guanche People which is classified as a neo-pagan native religion. Also present are Buddhism, Judaism, Baháʼí, African religion, and Chinese religions.

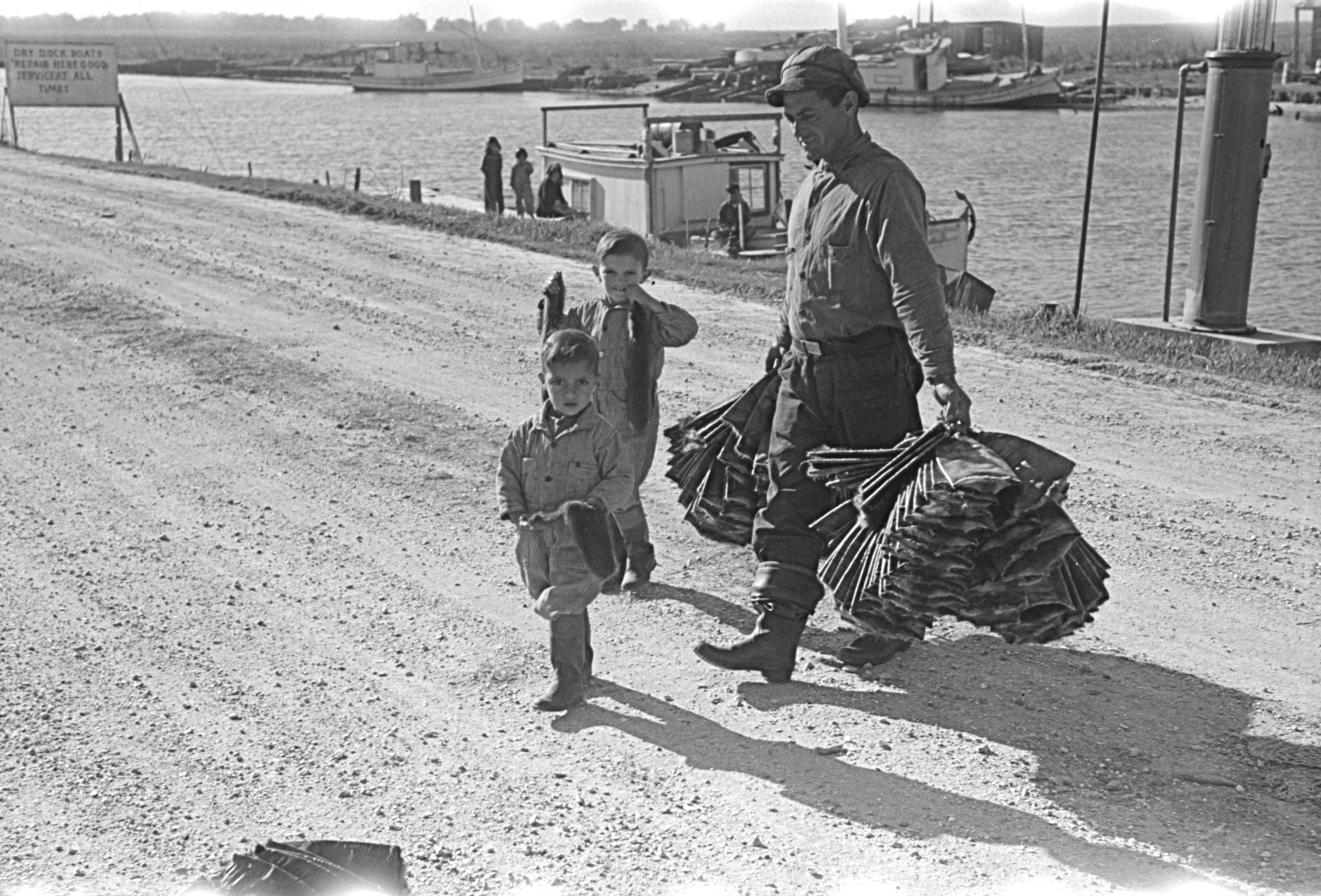
Isleño trapper and sons, Delacroix Island, 1941

==== Statistics ====
The distribution of beliefs in 2012 according to the CIS Barometer Autonomy was as follows:

- Catholic 84.9%
- Atheist/Agnostic/Unbeliever 12.3%
- Other religions 1.7%

Among the believers 38.7% attend religious services frequently.

== Canarian diaspora ==
Historically, the Canary Islands have served as a hub between Spain and the Americas; favoured by that circumstance, large groups of Canary islanders have emigrated and settled all over the New World as early as the 15th century, mainly in Cuba, Puerto Rico, Dominican Republic, Venezuela and Uruguay.

== Demographics ==
The Canarian population includes long-tenured and new waves of mainland Spanish immigrants, old settlers of Portuguese, Italian, Flemish, British, and French origin, as well as recent foreign-born arrivals. In 2019 the total population was 2,153,389, of which 72.1% were native Canary Islanders. A total of 80.6%, or 1,735,457, were born in Spain and 19.4%, or 417,932, were born outside the country. Of these, the majority are from the Americas, mainly from Venezuela (66,573) and Cuba (41,792) and Colombia (31,368). There are 38,768 people from Africa, the majority from Morocco (24,268).

Population history
Year	Population
1768	155,763
1787	168,928
1797	173,865
1842	241,266
1860	237,036
1887	301,983
1900	364,408
1920	488,483
1940	687,937
1960	966,177
1981	1,367,646
1990	1,589,403
2000	1,716,276
2010	2,118,519
2011	2,082,655
2019	2,152,590

Population of the Canary Islands 2019
Birthplace	Population	Percent
Canary Islands	1,553,517	72.1
Other regions (Spain)	176,302	8.2
Total, Spain	1,735,457	80.6
Foreign-born	417,932	19.4
Americas	201,257	9.3
Venezuela	66,573	-
Cuba	41,792	-
Colombia	31,361	-
Argentina	17.429	-
Uruguay	8,687	-
Rest of Europe	154,511	7.2
Italy	39,469	-
Germany	25,921	-
United Kingdom	25,339	-
Africa	38,768	1.8
Morocco	24,268	-
Asia	23,082	1.1
China	9,848	-
Oceania	314	0.0
Total	2,153,389	100.0%

=== Canarian identity ===
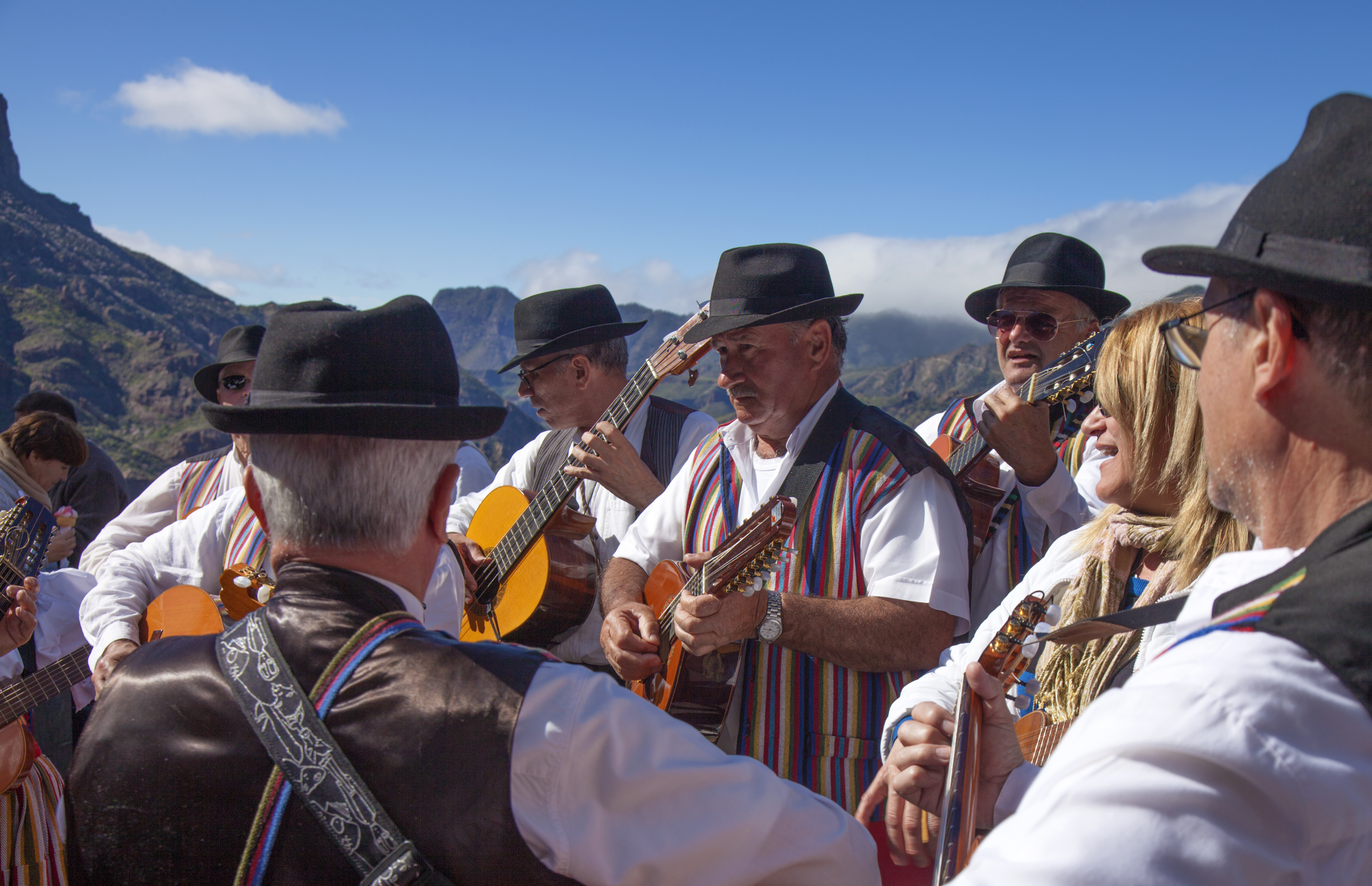
Canarian musicians in Tejeda

According to a 2012 study by the Centro de Investigaciones Sociológicas, when asked about national identity, the majority of respondents from the Canary Islands (49.3%) consider themselves Spanish and Canarian in equal measures, followed by 37.1% who consider themselves more Canarian than Spanish. Only 6.1% of the respondents consider themselves only Canarian.

National Sentiment in the Canary Islands
Only Spanish	3.5%
More Spanish than Canarian	2.0%
Equally Spanish and Canarian	49.3%
More Canarian than Spanish	37.1%
Only Canarian	6.1%
Did not answer	2.0%

== Notable Canarians ==
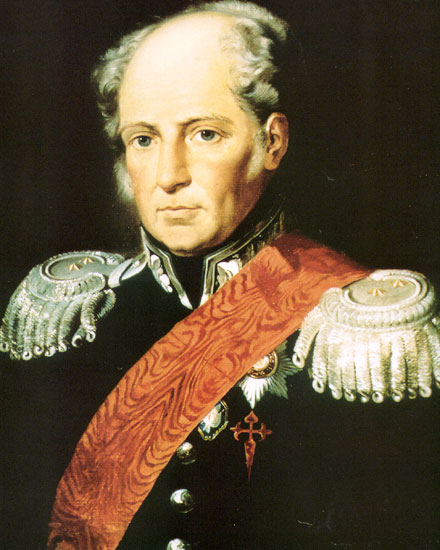
Engineer and General Augustin de Betancourt

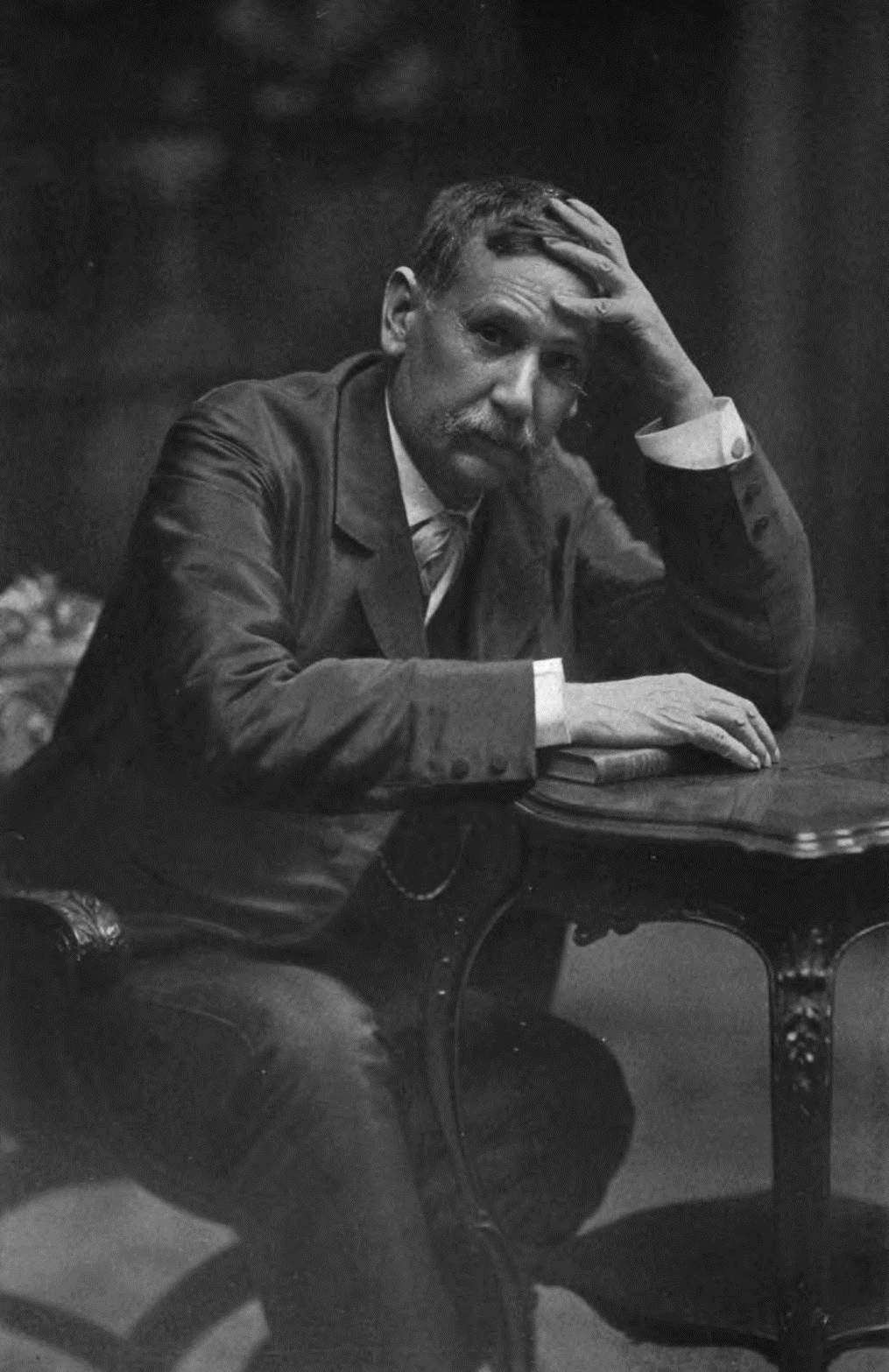
Realist novelist Benito Pérez Galdós

- Antonio Afonso Moreno, footballer
- Agoney, singer
- Amaro Pargo, one of the most famous corsairs of the golden age of piracy
- José de Anchieta, Jesuit priest, saint and missionary in Brazil
- Rosana Arbelo, singer
- Rafael Arozarena, writer
- Francisco Bahamonde de Lugo, Governor of Puerto Rico and Cartagena de Indias
- Javier Bardem, actor
- Ángel Guimerá, writer
- Bencomo, pre-Hispanic king
- Cristóbal Bencomo y Rodríguez, priest and confessor to Ferdinand VII
- Beneharo, pre-Hispanic king
- Wenceslao Benítez Inglott, navy officer, scientist and engineer
- Antonio Betancort, footballer
- Agustín de Betancourt y Molina, engineer, Russian General
- Peter of Saint Joseph Betancur, saint and missionary in Guatemala
- Manolo Blahnik, fashion designer
- José Comas Quesada, painter
- Antonio Cubillo, nationalist and revolutionary leader
- Óscar Domínguez, painter
- Doramas, pre-Hispanic warrior
- José Doreste, sailor, yacht racer and Olympic champion
- Luis Doreste, sailor, yacht racer and world champion and Olympic champion
- Nicolás Estévanez, politician
- Juan Carlos Fresnadillo, filmmaker
- Pedro García Cabrera, poet
- Antonio González y González, scientist and chemist
- Fernando Guanarteme, pre-Hispanic king
- Ana Guerra, singer
- Pedro Guerra, music composer and singer
- Emeterio Gutiérrez Albelo, poet
- Nancy Fabiola Herrera, mezzo-soprano opera singer
- K-Narias, reggaeton pop duo
- Alfredo Kraus, opera singer
- Fernando León y Castillo, politician
- Juan Fernando López Aguilar, politician and jurist, former Minister of Justice
- Maninidra, pre-Hispanic warrior
- César Manrique, artist
- Mary of Jesus de León y Delgado, Dominican lay Sister and mystic
- Cristo Marrero Henríquez, footballer
- Manolo Millares, painter
- Francisco de Miranda, Venezuelan general, politician and precursor of South America independence
- Manuel Mora Morales, writer and filmmaker
- Juan Negrín, politician
- Leopoldo O'Donnell, General and statesman
- Frances Ondiviela, telenovela actress, former Miss Spain and model
- María Orán, soprano
- Pedri, FC Barcelona footballer
- Benito Pérez Galdós, writer
- Domingo Pérez Minik, writer
- Narciso Rodriguez, American fashion designer born to Cuban parents with Canarian origins
- Sergio Rodríguez, NBA basketball player
- Pedro, professional footballer
- Aythami Ruano, judoka
- Jerónimo Saavedra, politician, mayor of Las Palmas and two times president of Canaries
- Victoria Sanchez, actress in American and Canadian movies and TV series
- Alfonso Silva, footballer
- David Silva, footballer
- Carla Suárez Navarro, tennis player
- Tanausu, pre-Hispanic King of Aceró
- Tinguaro, pre-Hispanic warrior General
- Goya Toledo, actress and model
- Juan Carlos Valerón, football player
- Alberto Vázquez-Figueroa, writer
- José Vélez, singer
- Juan Verde Suárez, politician
- José Viera y Clavijo, historian
- Eduardo Westerdahl, painter, art critic and writer, member of the Surrealist movement

== See also ==
- Berberism
- Canarian dialect
- Guanche language
- Isleños
- Kingdom of the Canary Islands
- Nationalities in Spain
- White Cubans
- White Dominicans (Dominican Republic)
- White Puerto Ricans

== Bibliography ==
- Penny, Ralph J. (2000). Variation and change in Spanish. Cambridge: Cambridge University Press. ISBN 978-0-521-78045-2.
- Pérez-Mallaína, Pablo (1997). "Auge y decadencia del puerto de Sevilla como cabecera de las rutas indianas". Caravelle. Cahiers du monde hispanique et luso-brésilien. 69 (1): 15–39. doi:10.3406/carav.1997.2753.
