= Minich =

Minich is a surname. Notable people with the surname include:

- Angelo Minich (1817–1893), Italian pathologist and professor of surgery at the University of Padua
  - Ponte Minich, a bridge in Venice
- Sergej Minich (born 1987), German politician
- T. J. Minich, American musician

== See also ==
- Minch (disambiguation)
- Minick (disambiguation)
- Minnich
- Minnick
- Minik (disambiguation)
