= Minnick =

Minnick is an Irish surname that could be an Anglicization of the Gaelic Ó Muineóg, or could be derived from manach meaning "monk".

Notable people with the surname include:

- Adam J. Minnick (born 1978), American cinematographer
- Ann Minnick (living), American nursing scholar
- Danny Minnick (born 1973), American painter and skateboarder
- Don Minnick (1931–2016), American baseball player
- Fred Minnick (born 1978), American writer
- John Harrison Minnick (1877–1966), American educator
- Joseph J. Minnick (1933–2015), American politician
- Miles Minnick (born 1993), American rapper
- Phil Minnick (born 1942), American gridiron football player
- Sarah Minnick (living), American chef
- Walt Minnick (born 1942), American politician

== See also ==
- Joel Minnick Longenecker (1847–1906), American farmer, soldier, lawyer, State's Attorney, Judge, gubernatorial candidate, and Department Commander of the Illinois Grand Army of the Republic
- Minnich
- Minick (disambiguation)
- Minich
- Minik (disambiguation)
