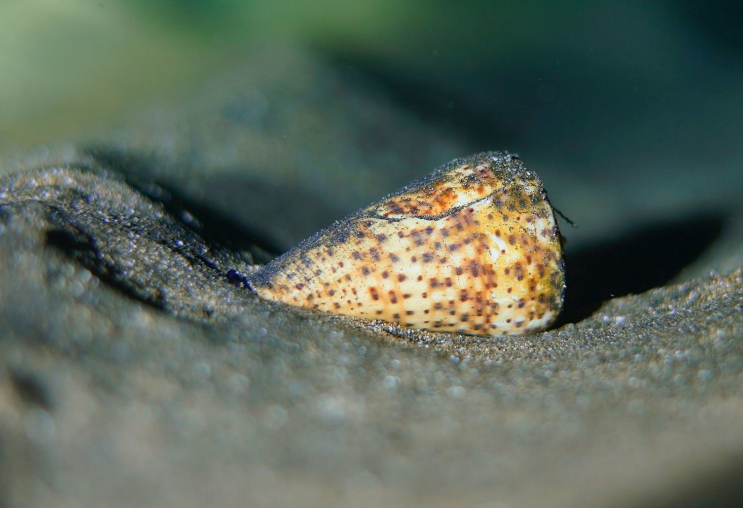
- Shell of Conus canariensis

Scientific classification
- Kingdom: Animalia
- Phylum: Mollusca
- Class: Gastropoda
- Subclass: Caenogastropoda
- Order: Neogastropoda
- Family: Conidae
- Genus: Conus
- Species: C. canariensis

Binomial name
- Conus canariensis (M. Tenorio, Abalde, Pardos-Blas & Zardoya, 2020)

Synonyms
- Kalloconus canariensis M. Tenorio, Abalde, Pardos-Blas & Zardoya, 2020

= Conus canariensis =

Species of mollusc

Conus canariensis, common name the butterfly cone, is a species of sea snail, a marine gastropod mollusk in the family Conidae, the cone snails and their allies.

Like all species within the genus Conus, these snails are protected by local Canarian regulations & laws, they predatory, poisonous and venomous & capable of stinging humans, therefore live ones should be handled carefully or not at all.

== Description ==
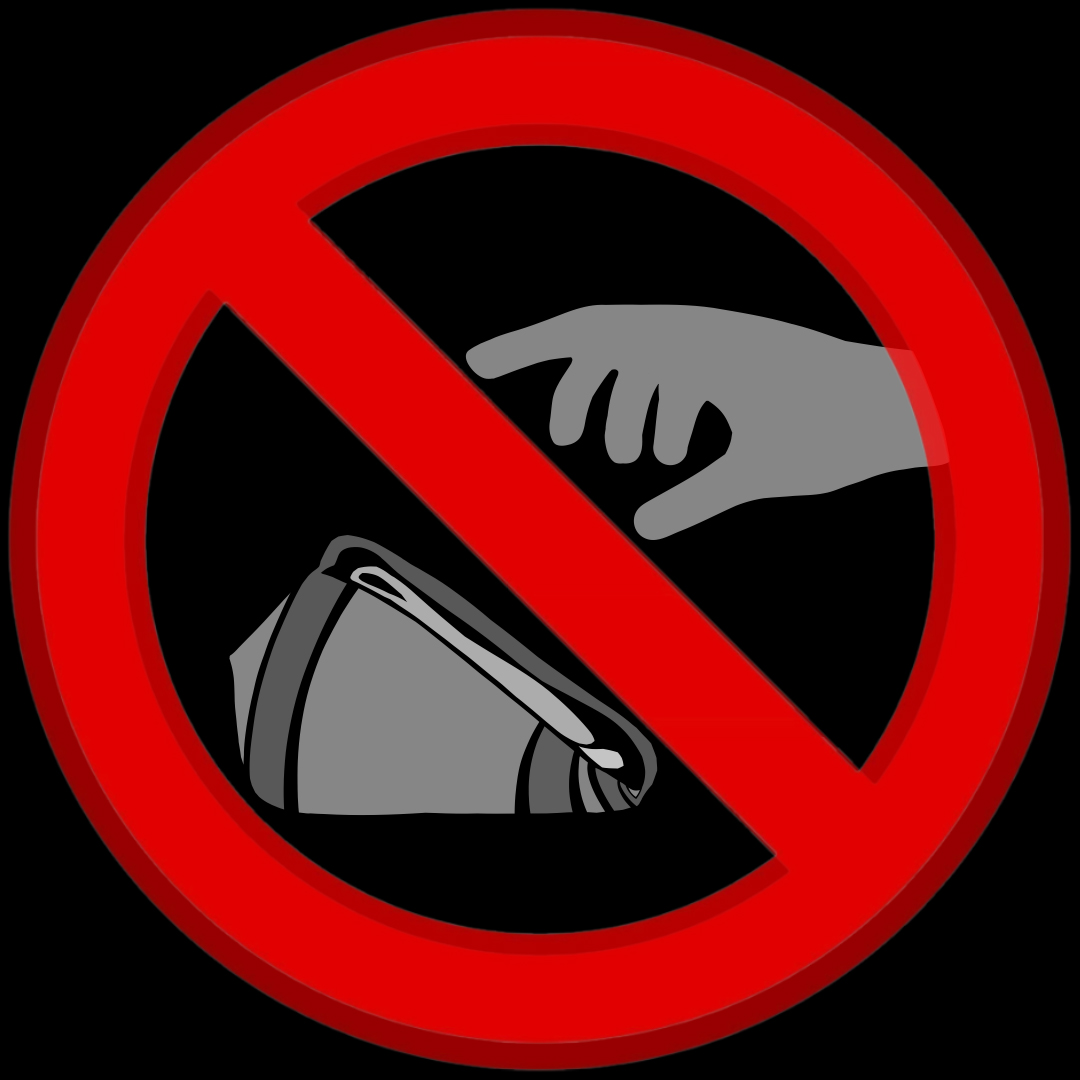
Collecting live specimens is prohibited in the Canary Islands.

The size of the shell varies between 15 mm and 270 mm.

== Distribution ==
This species occurs in the Atlantic Ocean off the Canary Islands.
