= Minnich =

Minnich is a surname. Notable people with the surname include:

- L. Arthur Minnich (1918–1990), American civil servant
- Manfred Minnich (1923–1985), German trumpet player and composer
- Minnie Minnich (1889–1941), American politician
- Nelson Minnich (born 1942), American historian and author

== See also ==
- Minnick
- Minich
- Minick (disambiguation)
- Minik (disambiguation)
