= Domingo Pérez =

Domingo Perez may refer to:

== Places ==
- Domingo Pérez, Granada, a municipality of Granada, Spain
- Domingo Pérez, Toledo, a municipality of Toledo province, Spain

== People ==
- Domingo González Pérez (1842–1927), Costa Rican politician
- Domingo Pérez Minik (1903–1989), Spanish writer
- Domingo Pérez (footballer) (1936–2024), Uruguayan soccer player
