= Minik =

Minik may refer to:

- Minik (given name), the given name
- Minik Wallace (ca. 1890 – 1918), an Inuk brought to the United States of America from Greenland along with five other Inuit in 1897 by explorer Robert Peary
- Domingo Pérez Minik (1903–1989), Spanish writer

== See also ==
- Minick (disambiguation)
- Minnick
- Minich
- Minnich
