= Minch (disambiguation) =

Minch may refer to:

== Places ==
- The Minch, sea channel separating the Outer Hebrides from the mainland of Scotland
- Minch-duvant-Vèrtan, local dialect name for Meix-devant-Virton, Belgium

== People ==
- Bloomfield H. Minch (1864–1929), President of the New Jersey Senate
- Matthew Minch (1857–1921), Irish nationalist politician
- Oscar F. Minch (1868–1953), member of the Wisconsin State Assembly
- Sergej Minich (born 1987), German politician
- Sydney Minch (1893–1970), Irish politician

== See also ==
- Minich (disambiguation)
