= Quierschied =

- Municipality
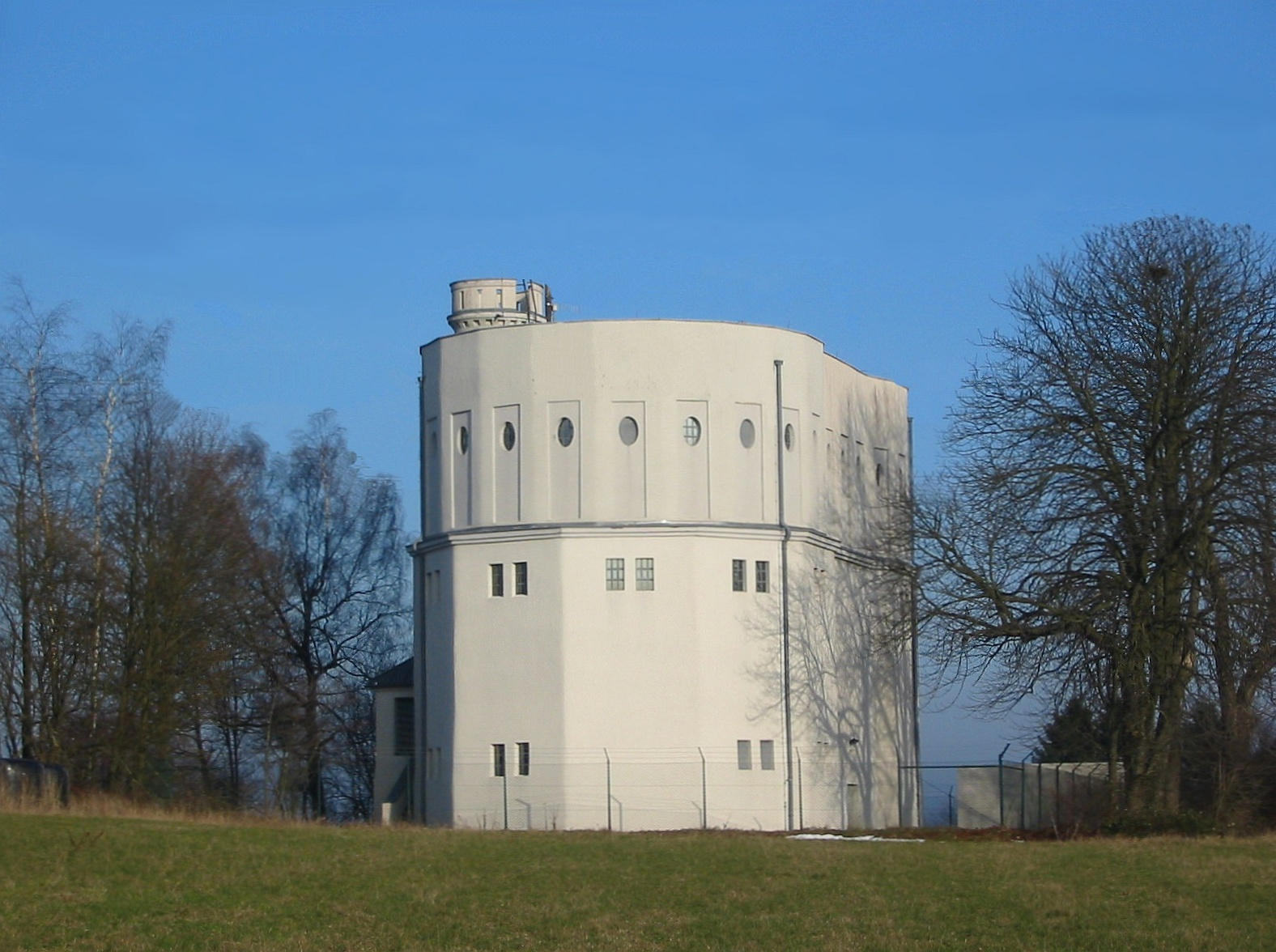
- Water tower in Göttelborn

- Coat of arms

- Location of Quierschied within Saarbrücken district
- Interactive map of Quierschied
- Location within Germany Location within Saarland
- Coordinates: 49°19′N 7°2′E
- Country: Germany
- State: Saarland
- District: Saarbrücken
- Subdivisions: 3

Government
  - Mayor (2015–25): Lutz Maurer (Ind.)

Area
  - Total: 20.21 km^{2} (7.80 sq mi)
- Elevation: 213–444 m (699–1,457 ft)

Population (2025-12-31)
  - Total: 12,757
  - Density: 631.2/km^{2} (1,635/sq mi)
- Time zone: UTC+01:00 (CET)
  - Summer (DST): UTC+02:00 (CEST)
- Postal codes: 66287
- Dialling codes: 06825, 06897
- Vehicle registration: SB
- Website: www.quierschied.de

Quierschied (German pronunciation: [ˈkviːɐ̯ʃiːt]) is a municipality in the district of Saarbrücken, in Saarland, Germany. It is situated approximately 11 km northeast of the city of Saarbrücken.

== Notable people ==
- Armin Hary (born 22 March 1937), German athlete who won a gold medal in the men's 100 meter dash at the 1960 Summer Olympics
- Manfred Minnich (1923–1985), German trumpet player
- Bruno Simma (born 29 March 1941), German jurist who served as a judge on the International Court of Justice from 2003 until 2012
