= Minick (disambiguation) =

Minick is a 1924 Broadway play written by Edna Ferber and George Kaufman.

Minick may also refer to:

- John W. Minick (1908–1944), United States Army soldier and a recipient of the Medal of Honor
- Johnny Minick (born 1955), American gospel singer and songwriter
- Pam Minick (born 1955), rodeo performer, film and television actress
- Pat Minick (1937 or 1938–2017), American drag racer
- Paul Minick (1899–1978), American football player
- Roger Minick (born 1944), American photographer
- "Old Man Minick", a 1921 short story by Edna Ferber

== See also ==
- Minnick
- Minich
- Minnich
- Minik (disambiguation)
