= Actors Studio =

Drama organization in New York City

Coordinates: 40.760068°N 73.992654°W

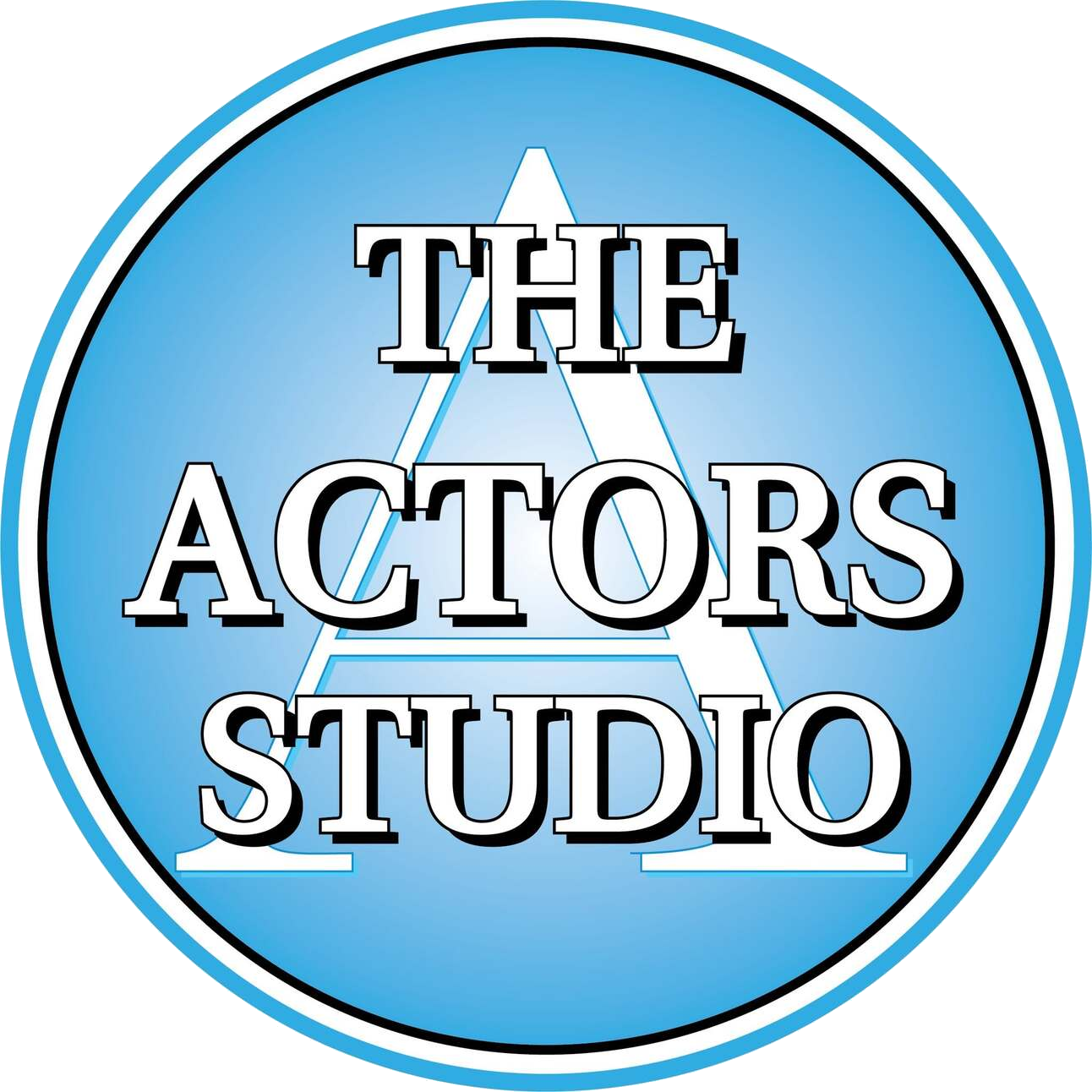

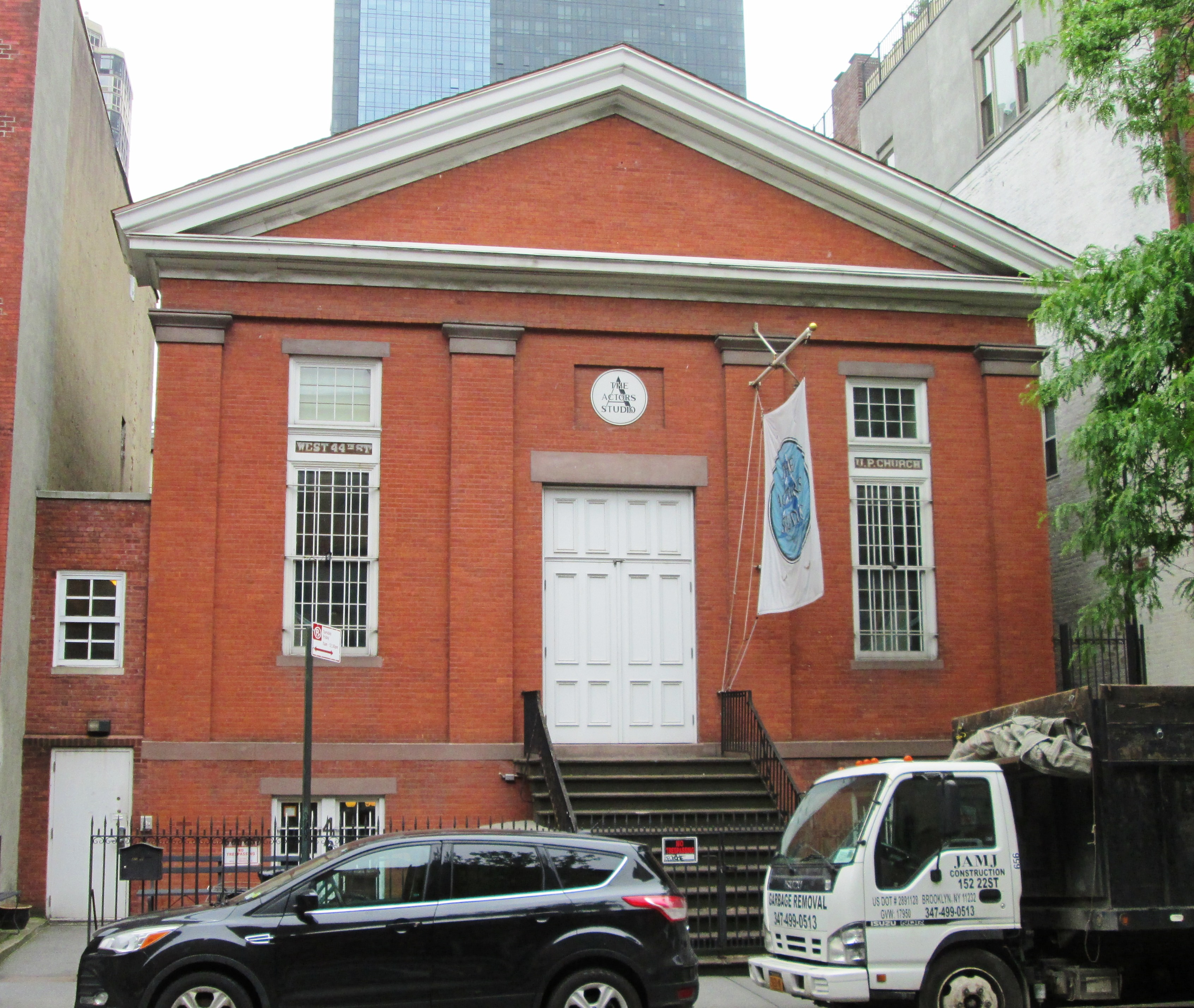
- Facade in 2018
- Formation: October 5, 1947; 79 years ago
- Type: Drama school
- Purpose: Organization for professional actors, theatre directors and playwrights
- Headquarters: 432 West 44th Street; Manhattan, New York City
- Region served: United States
- Key people: Al Pacino, Alec Baldwin, Ellen Burstyn (co-presidents); Martha Gehman, Javier Molina, Katherine Cortez, Rene Rivera (co-artistic directors); Estelle Parsons. Frances Fisher, William Hoffman (associate artistic directors)
- Website: www.theactorsstudio.org

New York City Landmark
- Official name: Actors Studio (Former Seventh Associate Presbyterian Church)
- Designated: February 19, 1991
- Reference no.: 1814

The Actors Studio is an American membership organization for professional actors, theatre directors and playwrights located on West 44th Street in Hell's Kitchen in New York City. It is located in the former Seventh Associate Presbyterian Church, a Greek Revival-style church building constructed in the late 1850s and designated as a New York City Landmark since 1991.

The studio is best known for its work refining and teaching method acting. It was founded in 1947 by Elia Kazan, Cheryl Crawford, and Robert Lewis, and later directed by Lee Strasberg, all former members of the Group Theatre, an early pioneer of the acting techniques of Konstantin Stanislavsky that would become known as method acting.

Notable actors and playwrights who have shared their work at the studio include Marilyn Monroe, Marlon Brando (who joined the studio in its first year), Lorraine Hansberry and James Baldwin.

While at the Studio, actors work together to develop their skills in a private environment where they can take risks as performers without the pressure of commercial roles.

As of September 2026, the studio's co-presidents are Ellen Burstyn, Alec Baldwin and Al Pacino. In New York, the co-artistic directors are Martha Gehman and Javier Molina, and the associate artistic director is Estelle Parsons. In Los Angeles, the co-artistic directors are Katherine Cortez and Rene Rivera, and the associate artistic directors are Frances Fisher and William Hoffman.

== History ==
After an initial meeting held on October 5, 1947, at the Labor Stage, located at 106 W. 39th Street (formerly the Princess Theatre), in which goals and ground rules of the new organization were discussed, the studio officially opened for business the following day.

Elia Kazan, Cheryl Crawford, and Robert Lewis, who founded the studio together, had all been members of the Group Theatre, an early adopter of method acting in the 1930s. Based on acting techniques first taught by Konstantin Stanislavsky at the Moscow Art Theatre, Method acting or the “Method” was further refined at the Actors Studio, including by Lee Strasberg, who had closely studied Stanislavski's theories at the Group Theater and who became director of the studio from 1952 until his death on February 17, 1982.

Around 700 actors auditioned in the studio's first year, with 50 actors selected to become its first group of members, including Marlon Brando. Once actors pass the studio's audition process they become life-members who can attend sessions where members present work to each other. Some non-members are also invited to observe sessions, and on rare occasions non-members such as Marilyn Monroe have been invited to present.

The studio has also provided opportunities for playwrights including Lorraine Hansberry, James Baldwin, Edward Albee and Tennessee Williams to develop new works.

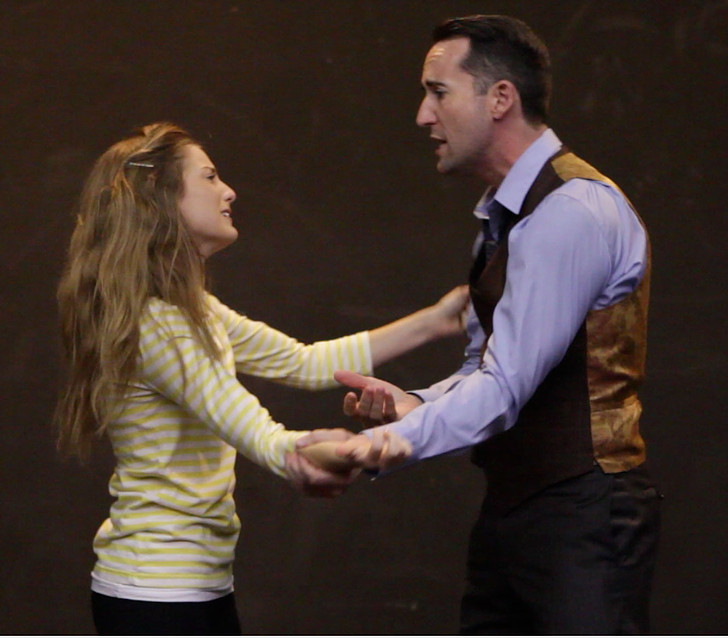
Caitlin Conner and Daniel Keith at the Actors Studio in 2021

== Location ==
Before settling in its current location in 1955, the Studio moved regularly over an eight-year period. It first opened in October 1947 at the Union Methodist Episcopal Church, located at 229 West 48th Street, previously home to the Actors Kitchen and Lounge (maintained to assist actors and others unable to afford meals), and long a source of rental rehearsal space for local theatrical producers.

In January 1948, it was a dance studio on East 59th Street. In April of that year, a move to the CBS Building at 1697 Broadway, near 53rd Street, established some semblance of stability; the Studio would not move again until the summer of 1952. From that point, the old Theatre Guild rehearsal rooms on the top floor of the ANTA Theatre became home, as they would remain until October 1954, when theatre renovations reduced the Studio to renting space twice a week. This it did at the Malin Studios at 1545 Broadway, Room 610. This arrangement continued throughout the 1954–1955 theatrical season, even as the Studio was acquiring and renovating its current venue. In 1955, it moved to its current location at 432 West 44th Street, a Greek Revival structure which was built for the Seventh Associate Presbyterian Church, in 1858 or 1859. It was one of the last churches to be built in that style in New York City.

== Graduate drama school ==
From September 1994 through May 2005, the Studio collaborated with The New School in the education of master's-level theatre students at the Actors Studio Drama School (ASDS). After ending its contract with The New School, the Actors Studio established The Actors Studio Drama School at Pace University in 2006.

== Lifetime members ==
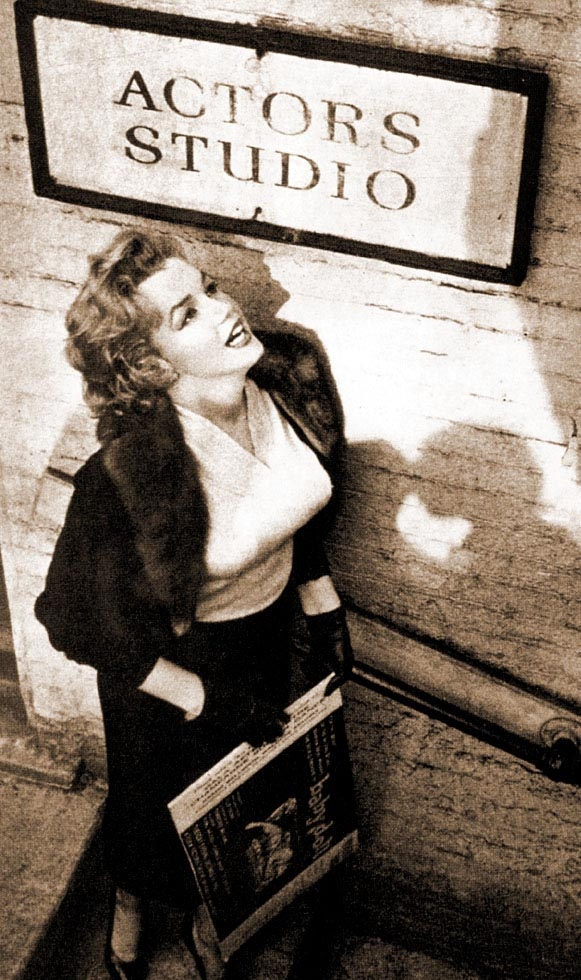
Marilyn Monroe at the Actors Studio in 1955

Some of the more well-known Lifetime Members of the Actors Studio are (as of July 24, 2023):

- Lou Antonio
- Michael Aronov
- Beatrice Arthur
- Alec Baldwin
- James Baldwin
- Martin Balsam
- Anne Bancroft
- Susan Batson
- Michael Bennett
- Marlon Brando
- Roscoe Lee Browne
- Ellen Burstyn
- Ellen Chenoweth
- Jill Clayburgh
- Montgomery Clift
- Miriam Colon
- Michael Cristofer
- Harold Clurman
- Bradley Cooper
- James Dean
- Robert De Niro
- Sandy Dennis
- Betsy Drake
- Robert Duvall
- Sally Field
- Jane Fonda
- Anthony Franciosa
- Ben Gazzara
- Carlin Glynn
- Lee Grant
- William Greaves
- Stephen Adly Guirgis
- Lorraine Hansberry
- Julie Harris
- Steven Hill
- Pat Hingle
- Dustin Hoffman
- Celeste Holm
- Frank John Hughes
- Kim Hunter
- William Inge
- Salome Jens
- Elia Kazan
- Elizabeth Kemp
- Harvey Keitel
- Lyle Kessler
- Shirley Knight
- Martin Landau
- Stephen Lang
- Cloris Leachman
- Melissa Leo
- Robert Lewis
- James Lipton
- Norman Mailer
- Joanna Miles
- Karl Malden
- Nancy Malone
- Peter Masterson
- Walter Matthau
- Steve McQueen
- Danny Minnick
- Marilyn Monroe
- Paul Newman
- Jack Nicholson
- Clifford Odets
- Al Pacino
- Geraldine Page
- Estelle Parsons
- George Peppard
- Nehemiah Persoff
- Lenka Peterson
- Sidney Poitier
- Sydney Pollack
- José Quintero
- Jerome Robbins
- Teresa Ruiz
- Mark Rydell
- Mark Rylance
- Eva Marie Saint
- Madeleine Sherwood
- Lois Smith
- Maureen Stapleton
- Rod Steiger
- David J. Stewart
- John Strasberg
- Lee Strasberg
- Michael Strong
- Eli Wallach
- Lesley Ann Warren
- Gene Wilder
- Shelley Winters
- Tennessee Williams
- Joanne Woodward

== See also ==
- Inside the Actors Studio
