= Manuel Mora Morales =

Canarian writer, filmmaker and editor

- Born: 10 May, 1952. La Gomera, Canary Islands
- Education: University of La Laguna
- Occupations: film writer, editor

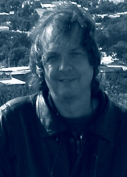
Morales in 2005

Manuel Mora Morales (born 10 May 1952 on La Gomera, Canary Islands) is a Canarian writer, filmmaker and editor. He completed his studies at the University of La Laguna on the island of Tenerife. He is the president of the Asociación de Editores de Canarias (lit. Canarian Editors Association).

== Selected works ==
He wrote several works including:

- Mitos y leyendas de las Islas Canarias (Myths and Legends of the Canary Islands).
- Todo sobre el libro (All about the Book), essay.
- Iballa, roman.
- El libro de Barbuzano (Barbuzano's Book), Biography.
- La conversación (The Chat), fiction.
- El libro de los guachinches (The secret Routes of the Wine), ethnography.
- El libro del gofio, ethnography.
- Historia de Tenerife (History of Tenerife), History.
- Historia de Gran Canaria (History of Gran Canaria), History.*El corazón de La Gomera (The Heart of La Gomera), book.
- La leyenda del Garajonay (Garajonay's Legend), Children's Fantasy.
- La emigración canaria a Cuba (The Canarian Emigration to Cuba), film and essay.
- Los canarios del Misisipi (The Canary Islander in Louisiana), film.
- Con la mano en el agua (With the hand in water), film.
- La emigración canaria a Puerto Rico (The Canarian Emigration to Puerto Rico), film.
- La emigración canaria a Venezuela (The Canarian Emigration to Venezuela), film.
- La emigración canaria a Uruguay y Argentina (The Canarian Emigration to Uruguay and Argentina), film.
- La emigración canaria a Santo Domingo (The Canarian Emigration to Santo Domingo), film.
- Tenerife paso a paso (Tenerife step by step), book.
- Gran Canaria paso a paso (Gran Canaria step by step), book.
- Playas (Beaches), film.
- El extraño caso del correíllo La Palma (The misthery of the steamboat La Palma), film.
- El patrimonio marítimo de Canarias (Coasts of the Canary Islands), documentary film.
- El Hierro, el corazón y la memoria (El Hierro, the Heart and the Memory), film.
