= Ponte Minich =

Coordinates: 45°26′18.22″N 12°20′29.81″E

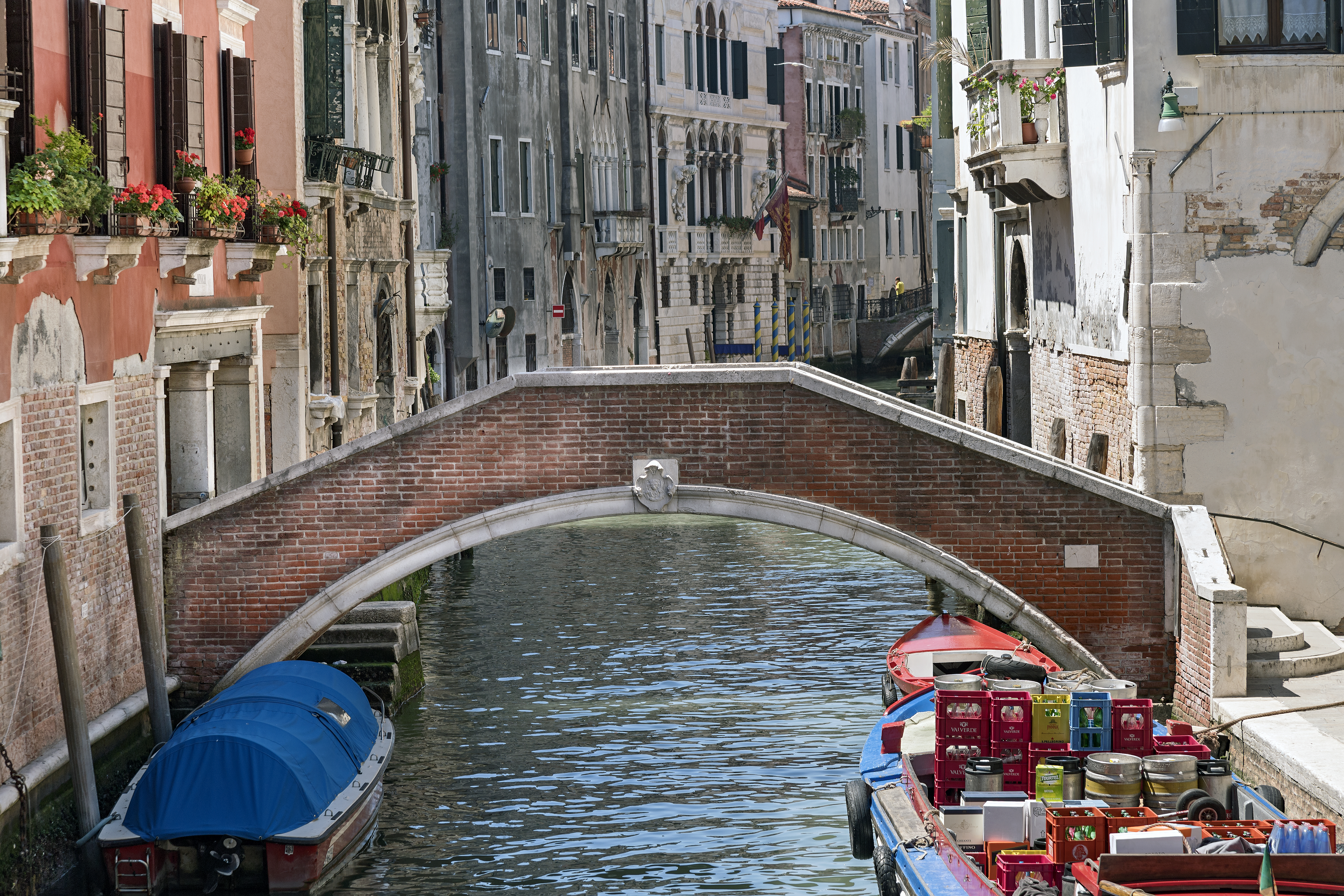
Ponte Minich

The Ponte Minich is a bridge which lies in the Sestiere Castello in Venice and connects the Calle Trevisan with the Calle Bressana. It is named after the surgeon Angelo Minich, who in his will of 25 September 1893 bequeathed the city of Venice thirty thousand lire for the comfort and education of the city, and to ensure the accuracy of the Venetian electrical clocks. The clocks still exist today; they have a white face with Roman numerals and housings made of cast iron.

The Minich bridge appears in numerous films including Mission: Impossible – Dead Reckoning Part One.
