= María Orán =

Spanish singer (1943–2018)

María Orán Cury (1943–2018) was a Spanish soprano who sang in leading music festivals in Europe, Mexico, Hong Kong, Australia and Israel. She performed with orchestras including the Wiener Symphoniker, the Hague Philharmonic and the Yomiuri Nippon Symphony Orchestra. In addition to her singing, she is remembered for teaching at the Escuela Superior de Canto de Madrid, the Freiburg Conservatory and the Conservatorio Superior de Música in her native Tenerife.

== Biography ==
Born in Santa Cruz de Tenerife on 1 May 1943, Orán studied music at the Canary Islands Conservatory and at the Madrid Royal Conservatory where she studied piano under José Cubiles and voice under Lola Rodríguez Aragón.

After making her début in 1963 with the Spanish National Orchestra, singing a selection from Wagner's Die Walküre, Orán participated in music festivals throughout Spain as well as those in Portugal, Mexico, Italy, Belgium, Germany, Poland, Hong Kong, Britain, France, the Netherlands, Japan and Australia. She performed with orchestras including the Wiener Symphoniker, the Suisse Romande, the London Philharmonic, the Hague Philharmonic and the Yomiuri Nippon Symphony Orchestra. In addition to her singing, she is remembered for teaching for over 20 years, spending seven years at the Escuela Superior de Canto de Madrid, a further 13 as a professor at the Freiburg Conservatory, after which she taught at the Conservatorio Superior de Música in her native Tenerife. She gave her final concert in January 2009 in Tenerife.

Her awards included the Premio Larios for musical interpretation (1993), the Island of Tenerife's Gold Medal (1994), and the Officer's Cross of the Order of Isabella the Catholic (1995).

After a long illness, María Orán died in Tenerife on 9 March 2018.
