= Danny Minnick =

American painter and skateboarder (born 1973)

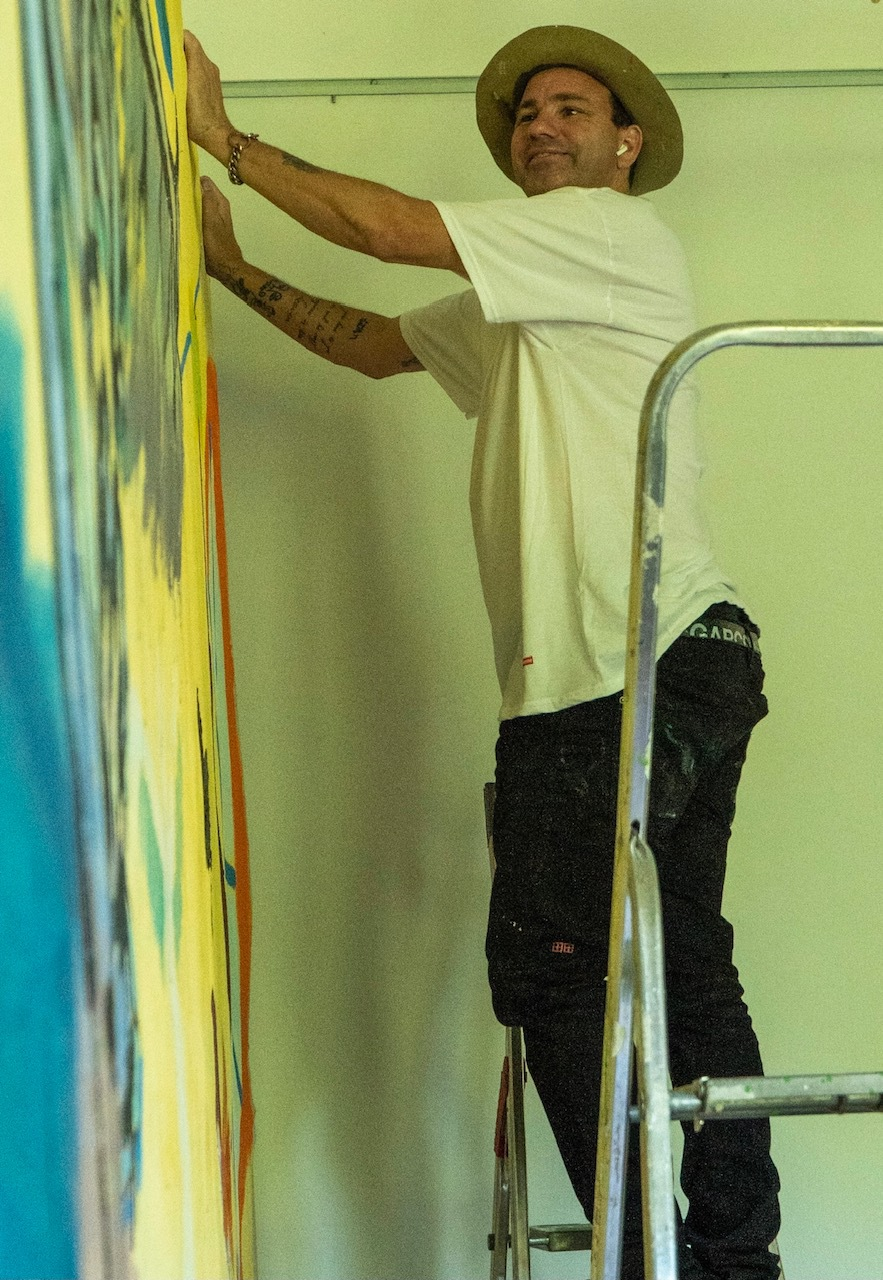
- Born: January 23, 1973
- Known for: Painting, Skateboarding, Acting
- Style: Neo-expressionism; Graffiti; street art
- Movement: Neo-expressionism
- Website: dannyminnick.com

Signature
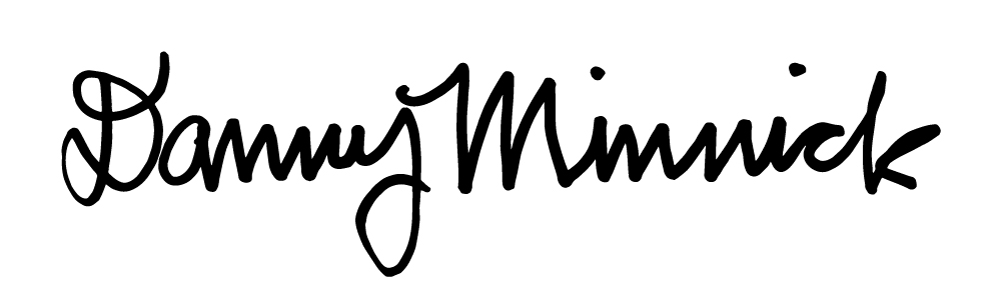

Danny Minnick (born January 23, 1973) is an American Neo Expressionist painter and professional skateboarder, skateboard cinematographer, actor and director. He has exhibited internationally and is a lifetime member of The Actors Studio.

== Early life ==
Minnick was born in Seattle, Washington, United States.

For Minnick, drawing is second nature and he could easily sketch out his favorite cartoon characters when he was only in 3rd grade.

At the same time, he started skateboarding.

== Professional skateboarding ==
Minnick became a professional skateboarder in his early teenage years. His career in skateboarding lasted for two decades. In 2010, he suffered from an Achilles tendon injury and pulled every ligament in his left ankle while working as an on-camera stunt double for three-time Olympic gold medalist Shaun White.

== Sponsorship ==
His first sponsors were Fallout Records and Skateboards, Venture Trucks, Vans, Spitfire Wheels and H-Street.

== Painting career ==
In 2011, Chad Muska, one of Minnick’s closest friends who is an artist and fellow professional skateboarder, taught Minnick how to stretch and build his own canvases and renewed his desire to paint.

Minnick began experimenting with painting, and his interest quickly transformed into a career when he received an opportunity for his first gallery exhibition, titled “17 Pieces.".

Minnick is known for his neo expressionist and vibrant painting style. Interview Magazine noted that distinctive features which include De Kooning’s bold brushstrokes, Pollock’s signature drips, Keith Haring’s cartoon imagery and Basquiat’s daring use of color, all had an impact on the development of Minnick’s style.

Minnick seeks to convey both hope and pleasure in his work. He attributes his success to “karma, fate, and a lot of hard work”.

Minnick prefers to work on large-scale canvases that convey a formidable presence and visceral experience. His figure, an entity named "Character,” is a human skeleton with a plus symbol in the torso created with stylized linear brush strokes. It is a symbol, according to Minnick, of the “positive energy” that he wishes to spread worldwide.

He is also influenced by the musicians Jimi Hendrix and Bob Dylan, and the artist Banksy. Minnick is also inspired by Enrico Mazzanti.

His work can be seen on the walls of places like Miami's Wynwood and the Barbican Underground Station in London.

In 2017, Minnick responded to Banksy’s homage to Jean Michel Basquiat entitled ‘Portrait of Basquiat being welcomed by the Metropolitan Police’ on the occasion of the Basquiat exhibition at The Barbican Centre, London. Minnick painted his creation, Character, arriving by skateboard and leaping through the air to place a crown on the head of Banksy’s Basquiat figure. This painting has been permanently preserved by The Barbican Centre, whose formal proposal for permanent preservation was approved by the City of London.

Minnick’s collectors include Robert Downey Jr., LeBron James, Lionel Richie, Fred Durst, Ron Burkle, Luis Guzman, Michelle Lamy, Jessica Alba, Nick Cassavetes, Michael Citrone, Gus Van Sant, Jamie Hince, Jason Momoa, KJ Apa, Mena Suvari, Darin Feinstein, and Rick Solomon.

According to Forbes, "A childlike sense of wonder and curiosity" is present in Minnick's work.

== Exhibitions ==
=== Solo exhibitions ===
- 17 Pieces - Rico Adair Gallery, Los Angeles 2011
- Paint to Connect the Dots - Gallerie Sparta, Los Angeles 2014
- Break the Walls - Boîte Noire Gallery, Los Angeles 2015
- Power To The Planet - De Re Gallery, Los Angeles 2017
- One Love - Maddox Gallery, London 2017
- Liquified Troubles - Geuer & Geuer Art, Dusseldorf 2018
- The 5th Dimension - Maxfield LA, Los Angeles 2019
- Liquified Troubles - Street Art Poetry - Kunstuerein ku, Ulm Germany 2019
- Liquified Troubles - Street Art Poetry - BEGE Galerien, Ulm, Germany 2019
- Liquified Troubles - Street Art Poetry - Kolvenburg Castle - Germany 2020
- My Own Private Paradise - Kulturstiftung Schloss Britz, Berlin 2022
- 18 Workz - Art Works Gallery, Singapore 2023
- VOCATION - Pellas Gallery, Boston 2025
- 20/26 - Gallery 33, Santa Monica 2026
- Spring Exhibition - Goldman Global Arts Gallery, Miami 2026

=== Group exhibitions ===
- Art Biennale - Shandong Museum, China 2020

== Acting and cinematography ==
As a director and cameraman, Minnick has created documentaries, many of which include his professional skating colleagues as an important topic. He went on to make "Genie of the Lamp," which had its premiere in Seattle at the King Kat Theater and "Collage," which had its premiere in Hollywood at the Egyptian Theater after a string of successful film runs which included "Brotherly Love," which he produced, directed and edited. "Balance in the World of Chaos," "Fulfill the Dream" and several projects for Thrasher, 411 and Transworld videos. Minnick has achieved success and longevity as an actor via intensive study and training. Minnick applied for the renowned The Actors Studio where he is a Lifetime Member after finishing extensive training with acting coach William Alderson, who studied and trained under the iconic Sanford Meisner.

In April 2006, American Cinematographer Magazine bestowed the title ” Skateboard Cinematographer” to Danny Minnick for the feature films, Larry Clark's “Wassup Rockers” and Chris Fishers “Dirty”.
