= José Comas Quesada =

Spanish painter

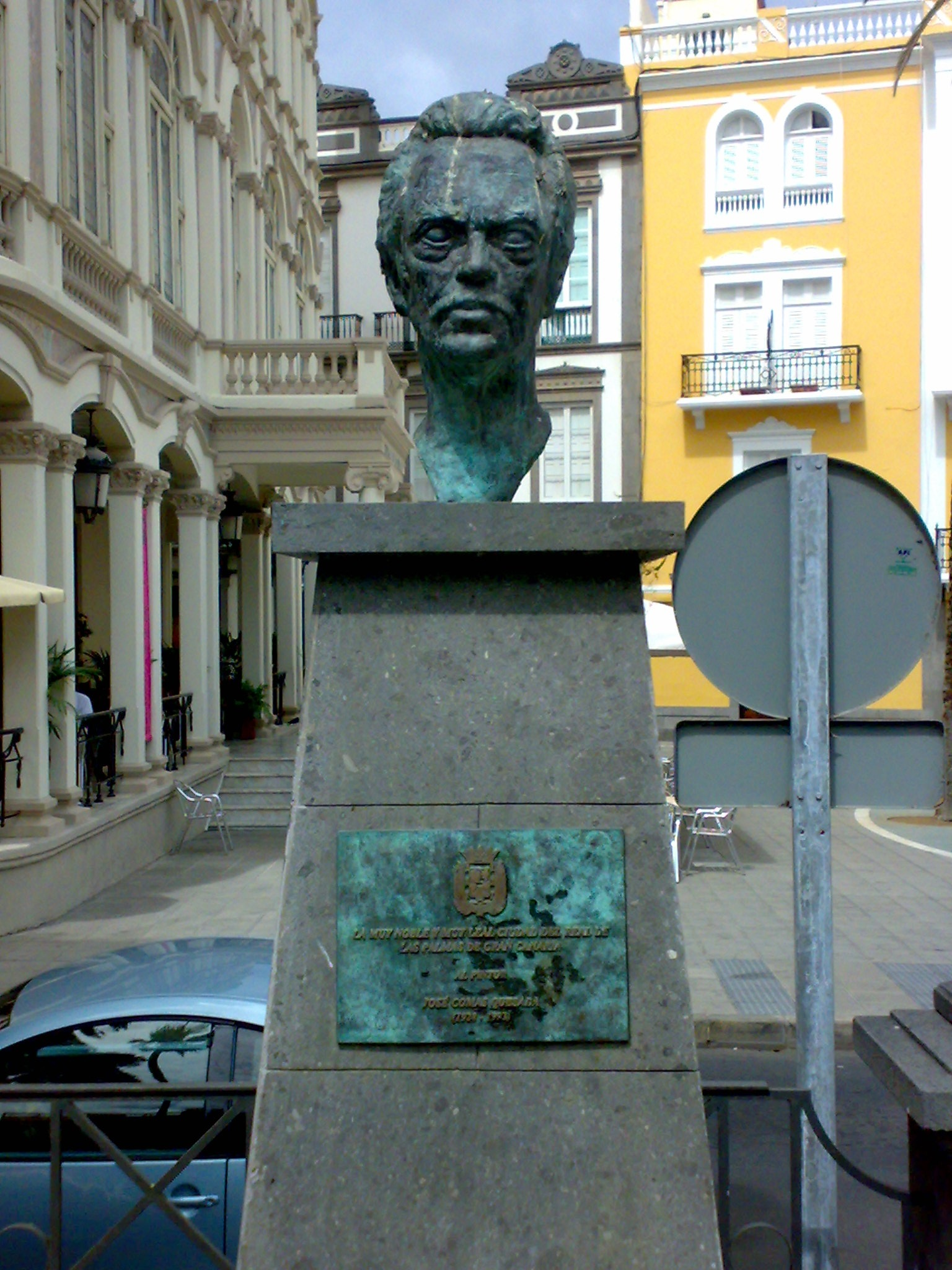
- Born: 3 February 1928; Las Palmas de Gran Canaria, Gran Canaria, Canary Islands
- Died: 14 January 1993 (aged 64); Las Palmas de Gran Canaria Canary Islands
- Known for: Painting, Watercolour, Drawing

José Comas Quesada (3 February 1928 – 14 January 1993) was a Canarian painter born in the Puerto de la Luz, Las Palmas de Gran Canaria. He is considered one of the greatest exponents of watercolour painting, both in the Canaries and Spain, of the last quarter of the 20th century.

== Artistic beginnings ==
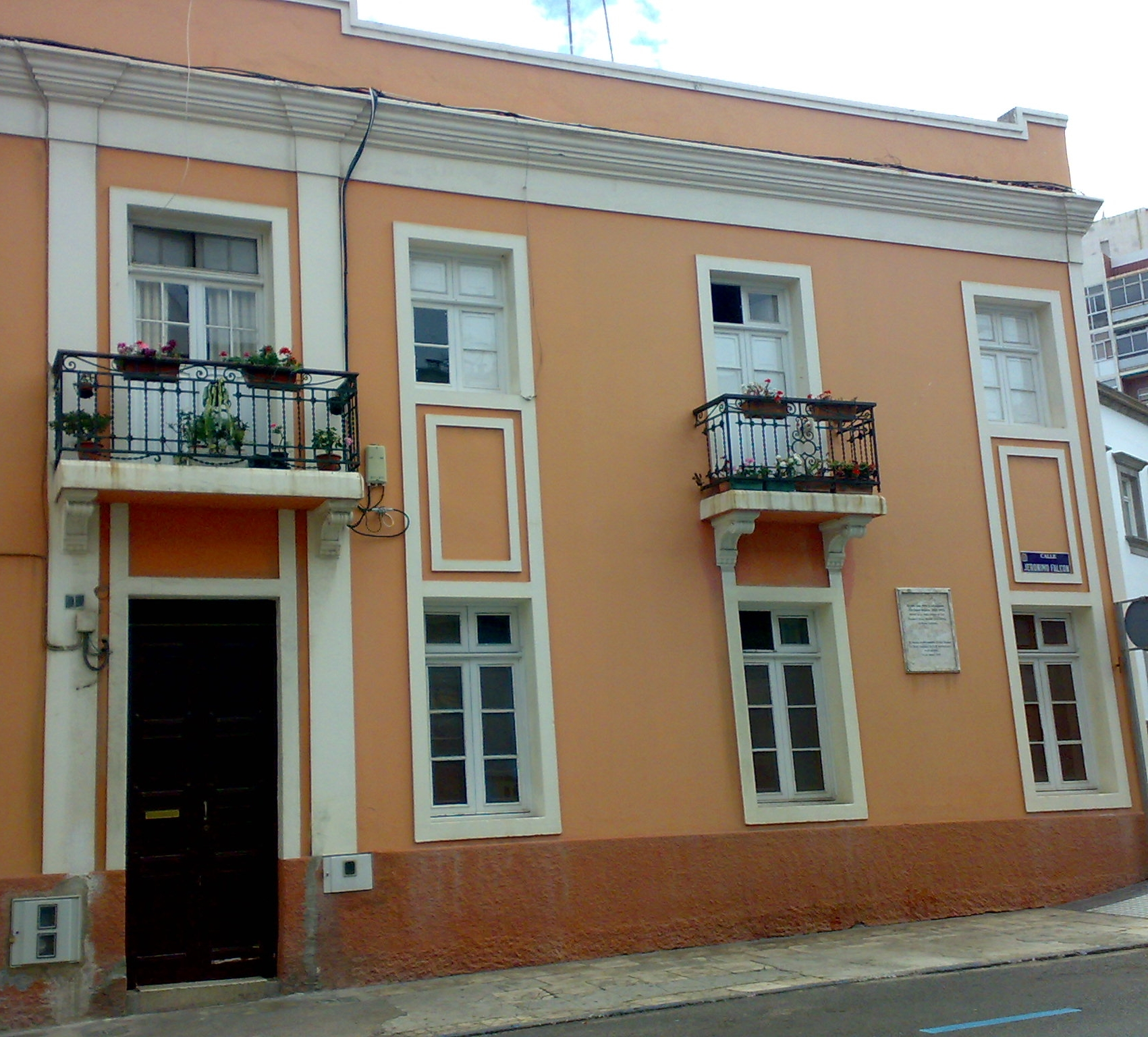
House where the painter lived.

Comas started in the art of painting at the early age of 15. His interest in it already excelled in the subject of drawing of the old high school, spending many hours to practice with pencil and charcoal. In those difficult times of the post-Civil Spanish War, his family did not consider painting a profession with future, as he explained in an interview:

"Entonces comencé peritaje mercantil, pero sin abandonar mi afición. Recuerdo que junto a varios amigos aprovechábamos los fines de semana para irnos con los caballetes en ristre a la zona de El Rincón o La Laja. La situación económica era tan mala que teníamos que hacernos nosotros mismos los caballetes preparando los lienzos con sacos de harina".

His interest in watercolour, pictorial technique which he would not leave and would become a vehicle of expression for the rest of his life, began when he was between 18 or 20 years, while he was looking at a watercolours by Francisco Bonnín Guerín in the "Gabinete Literario" of Gran Canaria's capital, saying about them:

"Aquellas acuarelas de Bonnín eran algo asombroso, aún recuerdo un bodegón, que daba el perfume de las cosas, la limpieza de tratamiento. (…) Recuerdo que iba al estudio a hacer mis pinitos con la acuarela, luego volver a la exposición… o sea que para mí Bonnín indirectamente fue un maestro".

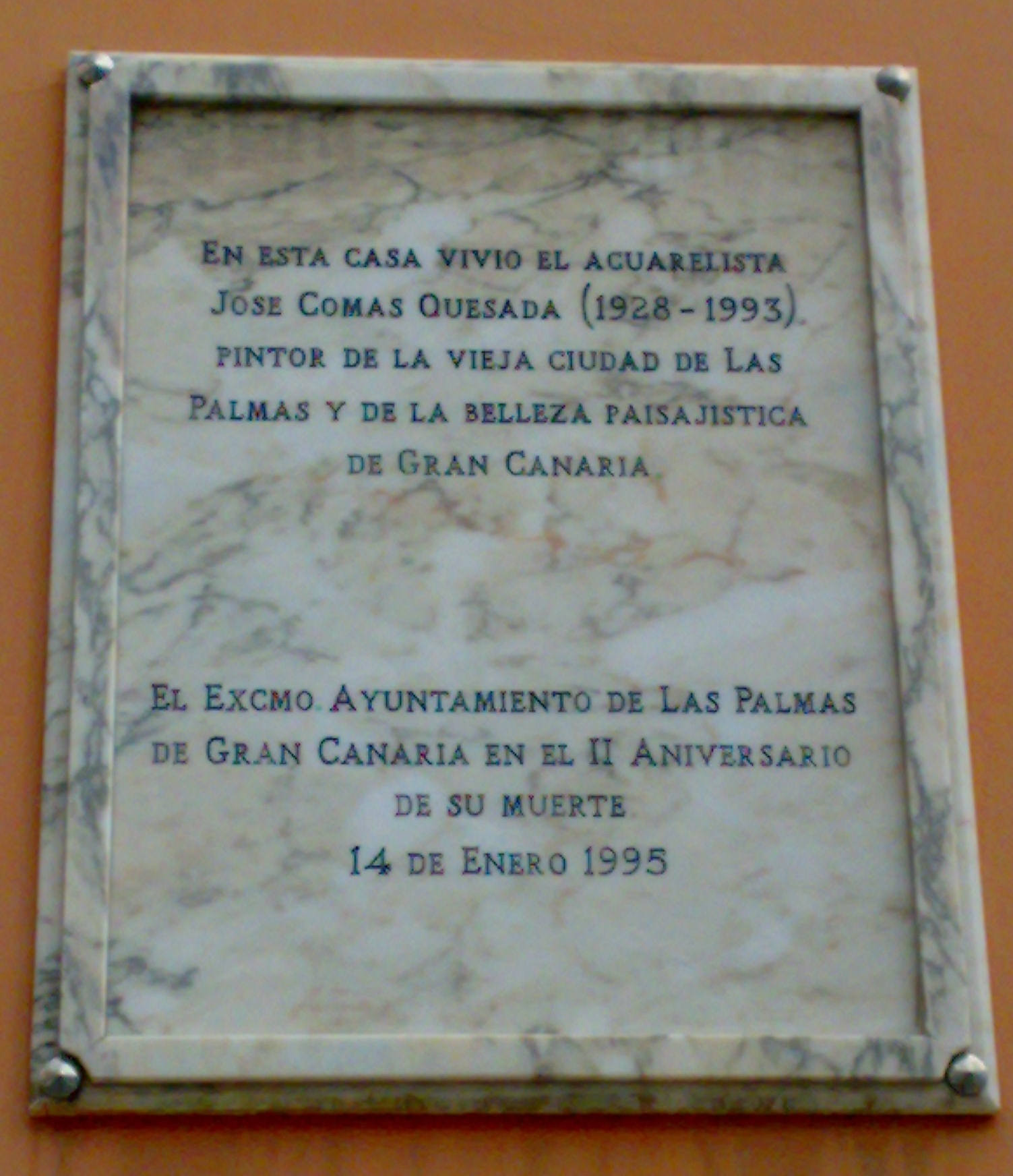
Commemorative plaque.

Watching at the paintings by Bonnín, José Comas learned the technique of watercolour indirectly, but about the style he felt more identified with that of Antonio González:

"Antonio González Suarez iba buscando lo que late, lo que se siente pero no se ve. Su paisaje de brumas y nieblas es también mi paisaje porque ese es mi sentimiento, las brumas, los días fríos.

Due to the economic situation of the 1940s he could not afford a teacher, although this was not an obstacle to learn by himself, taking his first steps in the techniques of pencil, wax, sanguine, oil and watercolour. He also practiced other artistic disciplines such as carving and sculpture modelling in clay, plaster or plaster cast, although his great hobby was always drawing.

During this first stage of his artistic career, he participated in several collective exhibitions, such as the Club PALA (1947) where he presented four small-format watercolours, as well as during the exposition of new painters on the occasion of the awards "Nicolas Massieu", in Las Palmas de Gran Canaria. He took part as well in the Biennial of Fine Arts of Las Palmas in 1950, 1952, 1958, 1960 and participated in the selection "Arti Grafiche Ricordi" (Milan, 1954).

After these first exhibitions he disappeared of the Canarian art scene for nearly twenty years because of family and work matters.

== Establishment as a watercolorist ==
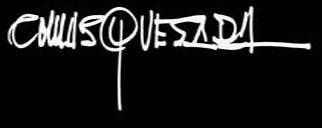
Painter's signature.

In 1974 he took up his true vocation, painting, and he became known in different art galleries of the moment. The unleashing that led to it was his work as representative of a company of moldings. At that time, the watercolourist felt like starting again and doubted on the artistic quality of these early pictures, hence he signed under the pseudonym of "Masca".

In 1975 he began exhibiting with the "Agrupación de Acuarelistas Canarios" (Canarian Watercolour Association), first in the art gallery Cairasco in Las Palmas de Gran Canaria and one year later at the Fine Arts Society in Santa Cruz de Tenerife. In 1976 he exhibited again in the above-mentioned Cairasco gallery, where he won the bronze medal of the Association for the watercolour entitled "Árboles y bruma" (Trees and mist).

== Commemorative watercolours: "The painter of the city" ==
Special mention deserve the collections created between 1977 and 1981, where he executed, among others, several successive series of watercolours whose leitmotiv was about the different spots of Vegueta and Triana neighborhoods and that coincided in time with the 500 anniversary of the founding of Las Palmas de Gran Canaria.

It was about evocative images of the old town, both contemporary to his time and retrospective of the late nineteenth and early twentieth centuries, in which were expressed the spirit of the historic town; intimate, impeccable and secluded places, deserted passages and alleys, churches, traditional Canarian balconies or kiosks witnesses of another era and time.

Some of the paintings reflected the city as it was in the late seventies, but the spaces which had been transformed or disappeared victims of progress, the artist turned to recreate them to his own memories and photographs from his personal archive. He knew how to capture with great sensitivity the environment and the atmosphere of yesteryear, leaving a documentary record for future generations, as no other painter of the time devoted to immortalize and portray the city to commemorate such an important event in the Canary Islands history.

Until the arrival of Comas Quesada, except for certain paintings by Nicolas Massieu, Felo Monzón, Jorge Oramas and a few more authors, Las Palmas was a city without painters who portray her. And if Massieu is regarded as the painter of Gran Canaria, Comas Quesada is the painter of its capital city, because until then no other artist had produced so many works on it.

This is the reason why he is known as "the painter of the city", he was a kind of historian, a "pictorial chronicler." For those pictures in particular, he sacrificed his usual technique by glazes and a certain tendency to abstraction, by an absolute fidelity in drawing and approaching to the local colour, moving us to bucolic and romantic scenes from the past, transmitting all the beauty and charm which every place irradiated and that only a master of watercolour as he was, knew how to grasp and understand. The first of the collections came out in June 1977, when the artist presented in a folder 6 watercolours published in limited and numbered series, in which were captured picturesque scenes from the founding neighborhoods of Vegueta and Triana.

A month later, on 4 July 1977, three years after his return to the art world and in his own words, without being totally convinced of the quality of his paintings, he carried out his first solo exhibition. With it, was inaugurated the art gallery "Madelca", then located at Santa Ana main square in the Canary Islands' capital. It was a collection of 20 watercolours which depicted different parts of the old town, going ahead to the commemoration of the V Centenary of the founding of Las Palmas de Gran Canaria which was marked the next year. That year he won the contest of the late Cairasco gallery, receiving the silver medal by the "Agrupación de Acuarelistas Canarios" (Canarian Watercolorist Association) for the work "Bruma" (Mist), as well as the award of "collection of work" by the Saving Bank of Gran Canaria.

In July 1978, he offered another solo exhibit at "Madelca" presenting again themes on the historic centre to mark the 500th Centenary of the constitution of his hometown, on this occasion the collection comprised 30 watercolours. In December he won the gold medal of the Canarian Watercolour Association Association, during the IV competition held at the Cairasco exposition gallery, for "Bruma" (Mist).

In 1979, another series of watercolours about the old quarter of Gran Canaria's capital entitled "Homenaje a la vieja Ciudad" (Homage to the old city). That same year he won the first prize for the painting called "Crepúsculo en el Sur" (Twilight in the South) at the First Biennial of Watercolour "Ciudad de Las Palmas".

Due to the successful reception of the 1977, 1978 and 1979 series on the historic areas of Vegueta and Triana, these cityscapes are depicted again in some watercolors and prints in the Art Gallery of Gran Canaria Savings Bank, in December 1981. While not forgetting that he also created different collections with other landscape thematic during those years.

From 1981 he decided to bring to a close this thematic (although Las Palmas would be his "muse" for the last time in 1991), stating:

"Mi amor y mi entusiasmo por la ciudad y por Vegueta está suficientemente demostrado. He llevado a Vegueta durante muchos años fijo en mi mente, lo he pintado desde todas sus esquinas y ya la gente cuando ve por ahí una acuarela de la ciudad sabe si es mía o de otros pintores".

During the 1980s and early 90s he continued to participate in various individual and collective exhibitions, in several cultural centers and galleries of Gran Canaria, Tenerife and Fuerteventura.

In 1985 he became a member of the newly founded "Asociación Canaria de Acuarelistas" (Canarian Association of Watercolorists), also taking part in their expositions.

== Last phase: 1982-1992 ==
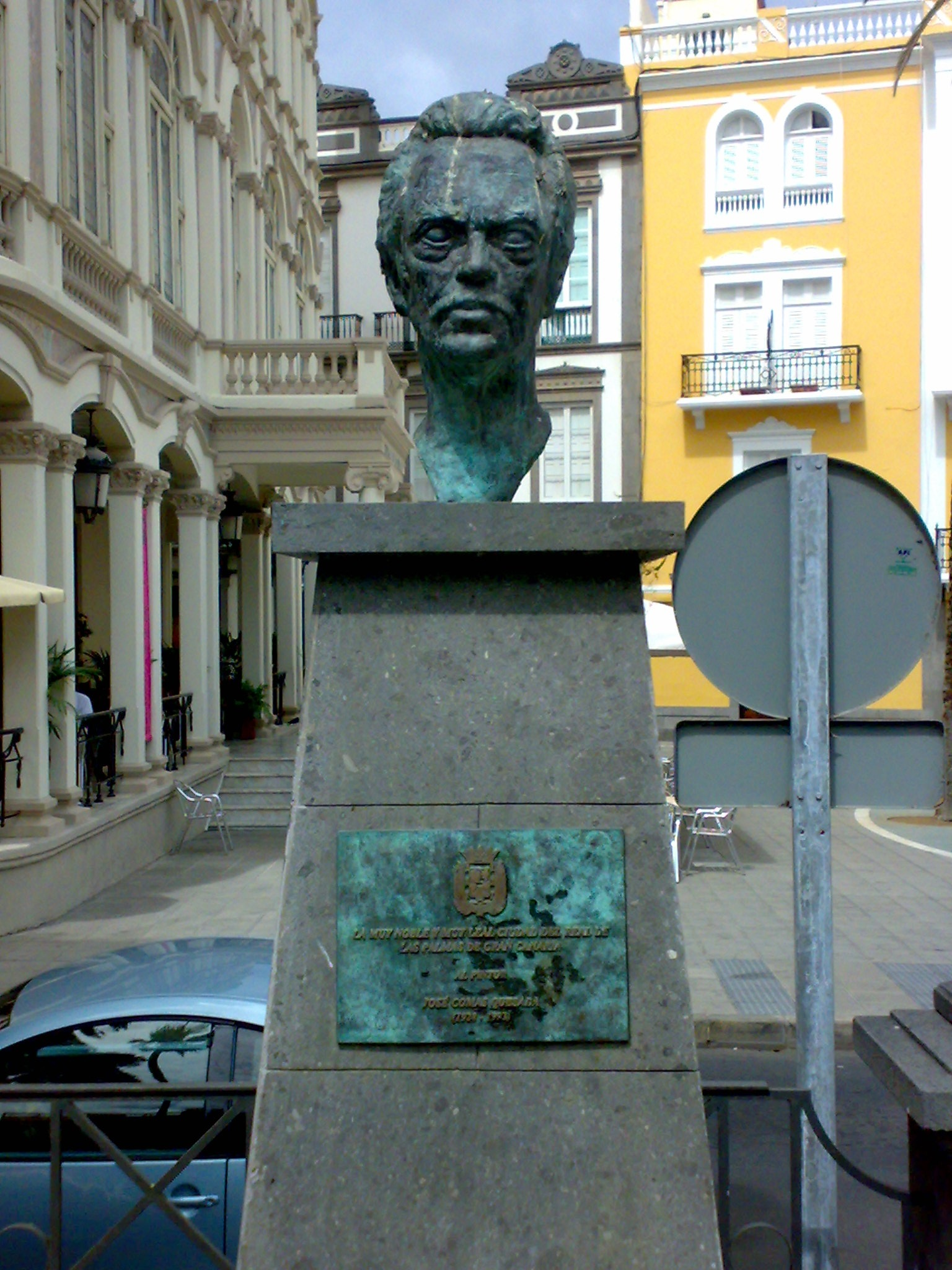
Comas Quesada memorial in his hometown.

In the last stage of his artistic career he broke with the illustrative and tried non-traditional compositions, he became more sober in colour and blend tonalities looking for a wider range of colours. This synthetic and suggestive line though not new, it is at this stage of creative maturity when it get a creative peak. As he stressed at the time:

"Me siento subyugado por los efectos neblinosos, por las brumas, las aguas encharcadas… atmósfera intemporal que produce efecto onírico. Es como si buscara en el paisaje que encanto hay detrás, en lo que no se ve, en ese misterioso más allá que no percibimos pero sí admiramos… sugiero una idea, elimino elementos que no me interesan, abstraigo de la realidad".

In September 1991, which would be the last exhibition held during his lifetime, presented a trilogy called: "La Vieja Ciudad" (The Old Town), "Rincones Isleños" (Island Spots) and "Espacios Abiertos" (Open Spaces). Regarding the first, the watercolorist recovered again the subject Las Palmas old quarter, but dealt with a renewed technique with an agile and vigorous brushwork, more decision in drawing and a greater chromaticism in his palette, highlighting he was a painter whose artistic expression was always in constant evolution and searching new ways of expression.

What characterizes and defines the pictorial production of Comas is a constant interest in both the traditional architecture and natural landscapes of the coasts, midlands and highlands of Gran Canaria, seascapes, houses with tile roof, patios and balconies, and so on. Likewise, he also painted many of the most representative places of the island of Tenerife, as well as some of Fuerteventura.

The style of the watercolorist is completely identifiable, from the colour to the atmosphere, -that extraordinary use, but without exceeding, of the sfumato- everything has an emphasis in the area of the card: line and perspective, differentiation of plans, wash fluency, etc. There is a constant preference to reproduce certain effects and atmospheric elements that give many of his paintings a distinctive feature; fog, skies of various coloured clouds, water reflections, puddles, rainy days, etc. Seascapes where the form becomes evanescent, treatments of blue, white and golden exquisites which remind of one of the great masters of watercolour of all times, of Turner.

He joined to the tenets of the so-called "experimental watercolour", name that opened two exhibitions in 1966 and 1971 respectively in La Laguna (Tenerife). This trend advocated for experimentation, surpassing the traditional molds that dominated the genre and offering a renewed vision in keeping with the style of the moment.

José Comas Quesada was a virtuoso of drawing, an impeccable master of the classic watercolour who knew how to reflect the light and the colour of the Canaries. According to his own words:

"He pintado con gusto y para mí es una satisfacción el dominio de la técnica. Pero no es pintar por pintar, hay que pintar con sentimiento, con el corazón, y hay que ser profesional".

== Gallery of works (1977) ==
Paintings belonging to the series of 20 watercolours, where are depicted different places of Vegueta and Triana districts in Las Palmas de Gran Canaria.
