= Ann Minnick =

American nursing scholar

Ann Minnick is an American nursing scholar focusing in safety and quality in hospitals and workforce and academic quality.

Minnick is currently the Julia Eleanor Chenault Professor at Vanderbilt University.
