= Manfred Minnich =

German trumpet player, composer, arranger and conductor (1923-1985)

- Minnich in c. 1970s-1980s

Background information
- Born: 12 December 1923; Fischbach, Quierschied, Saarland, Germany
- Died: 17 August 1985 (aged 61) Fischbach, Quierschied, Saarland, Germany
- Genre: Jazz
- Occupations: Composer; conductor; bandleader; arranger
- Instrument: Trumpet

Manfred Minnich (12 December 1923 – 17 August 1985) was a German trumpet player, composer, arranger and conductor. Born in Fischbach, a small town in the municipality of Quierschied in the German state of Saarland, he founded the SR Dance Orchestra and was its leading conductor until 1964. He then handed over leadership of the orchestra to Eberhard Pokorny, but continued working for the SR Dance Orchestra as an editor. He died on 17 August 1985 in his hometown of Fischbach. Minnich had many different pseudonyms such as: "Boris Schoska, George Potella, and George Winters".

== Early life ==
Manfred Minnich was born on 12 December 1923 in Fischbach, Quierschied, then a part of Nazi Germany, and his early life is not well documented. From when Minnich was young he had fostered a talent for music, mainly with the trumpet, which became his main instrument. As he got older he expanded in the industry by joining the composing scene, leading to the creation of the SR Dance Orchestra.

== Career ==
Minnich primarily played the trumpet; this was his main instrument throughout his career. In addition to playing the trumpet, he was also a conductor, music composer, and arranger. He contributed widely to the post-war music in Germany. Minnich was encompassed in many different groups: he was most notable as the founder of the SR Dance Orchestra, which he played and directed music in. He was a part of several more different orchestras, including Orchester David Summerfield, Orchester Manfred Minnich, Orchester Michael Coster, Tanzorchester Des Saarländischen Rundfunks, The George Winters Band, The George Winters Orchestra, and The Manfred Minnich String Orchestra. He led the orchestra until 1964, when he stepped down from the conducting role; Eberhard Pokorny succeeded him. He continued to still contribute as a music editor, keeping his ongoing influence in the music scene. Minnich was a niche composer and did not win any awards. His most well-known piece is "No More", being used in many pieces of media as well as in the video game Roblox. The children's cartoon SpongeBob SquarePants uses his song "Waltzing Flutes". Minnich died in Fischbach on 17 August 1985.

== Radio plays ==
As a composer

- 1955: Klaus L. Graeupner: The Ballad of Kunibert – Director: Peter Arthur Stiller (Short Radio Play – Radio Saarbrücken)
- 1956: Walter Kolbenhoff: At the End of the Street – Director: Peter Arthur Stiller (Radio Play – SR)
- 1956: Lester Powell: Lady in the Fog (8 episodes) – Director: Albert Carl Weiland (Original Radio Play, Crime Radio Play – SR)
- 1956: Hans Hömberg: Japanese Dream Play – Director: Peter Arthur Stiller (Original Radio Play – SR)
- 1957: Lester Powell: The Lady is Blonde (8 episodes) – Director: Albert Carl Weiland (Original Radio Play, Crime Radio Play – SR)
- 1959: Lester Powell: The Lady with the Gray Curls (8 episodes) – Director: Albert Carl Weiland (Original Radio Play, Crime Radio Play – SR)
- 1960: Lester Powell: The Lady Films (8 episodes) – Director: Albert Carl Weiland (Original Radio Play, Crime Radio Play – SR)
- 1961: Lester Powell: The Lady Writes (8 episodes) – Director: Albert Carl Weiland (Original Radio Play, Crime Radio Play – SR)
- 1962: Hans Hömberg: The Horse of the Cheerful Lark – Adaptation and Direction: Jörg Franz (Original Radio Play – SR)
- 1962: Wolfgang Altendorf: The Kraptaken-Tuft – Director: Jörg Franz (Original Radio Play – SR)
- 1962: Rainer Puchert: Manoeuvre – Director: Miklos Konkoly (Radio Play – SR)
- 1964: Lester Powell: The Many-Loved Lady (6 episodes) – Director: Albert Carl Weiland (Original Radio Play, Crime Radio Play – SR)
- 1971: Lester Powell: The Lady is Reckless (5 episodes) – Director: Albert Carl Weiland (Original Radio Play, Crime Radio Play – SR)

Source: ARD-Hörspieldatenbank

== Discography ==
- 1970: Gerhard Narholz Orchestra, Manfred Minnich Orchestra – Dance Express, Tip Record Production
- 1970: The Manfred Minnich String Orchestra, Studio One
- 1973: Music for Dancing, Karussell
- 1973: Manfred Minnich Orchestra/Herbert Küster Orchestra – Midnight Party, Karussell
- 2021: Vintage Pearls: Retro Things with Strings – Manfred Minnich
- The Manfred Minnich Orchestra/The Gerhard Narholz Orchestra, Studio One
- Manfred Minnich Orchestra/Ernst Bogenhaus, Europhon
- Manfred Minnich Orchestra, Rick Lane Orchestra – Dance Party, Tyrolis
- The Manfred Minnich String Orchestra, Studio One
