= Angelo Minich =

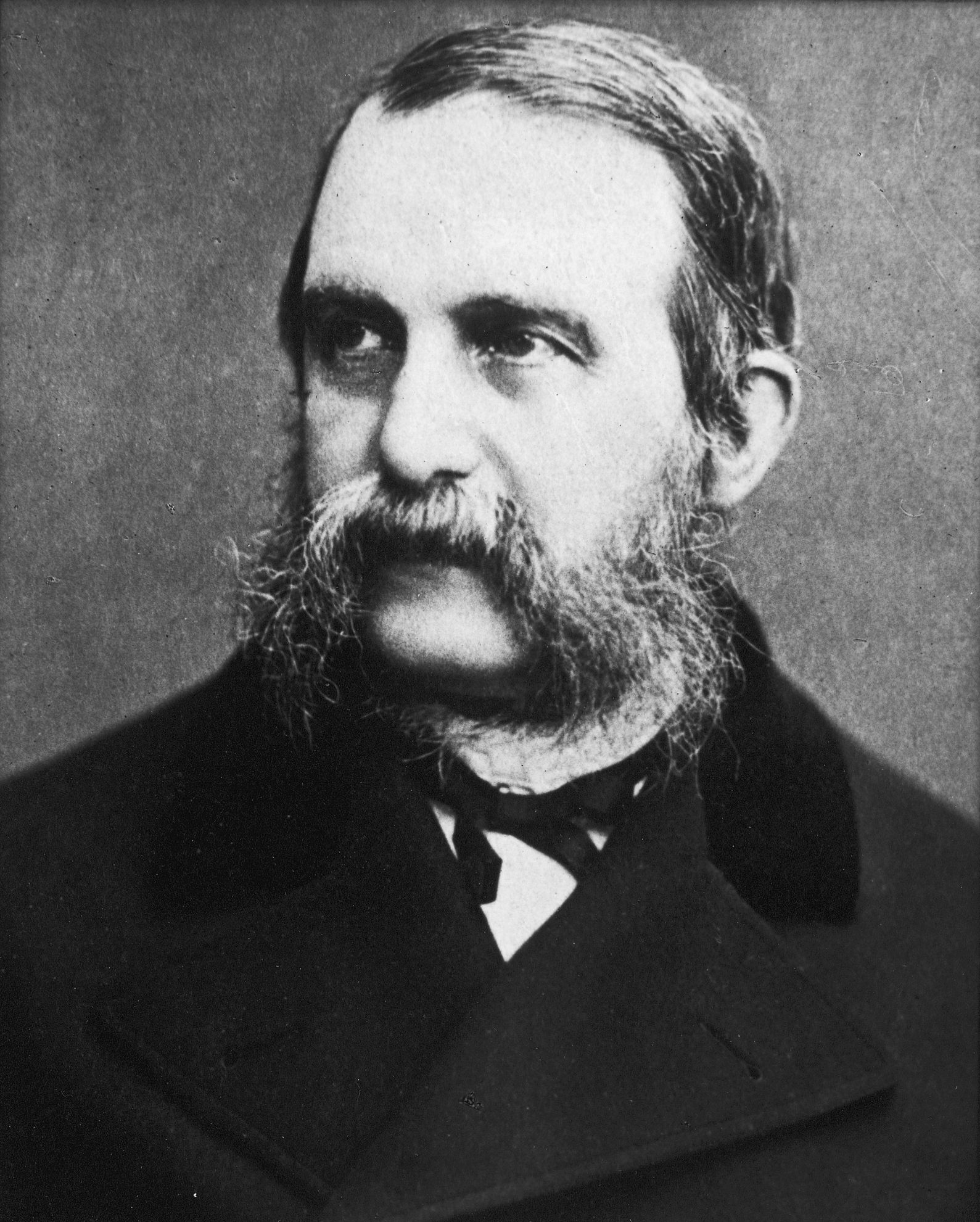
Angelo Minich, circa 1800.

Angelo Minich (1817–1893), a pathologist, was professor of surgery at the University of Padua. Born in Venice on 30 September 1817, he studied medicine at Padua and at Pavia, where he graduated in February 1840; he took a further degree in surgery in Padua a few months later. He then specialised in Vienna and worked in Germany, Belgium and England, becoming convinced that the basis of medicine was pathological anatomy.

At the end of 1843 he became subsidiary surgeon at the Civil Hospital of Venice, and the following year was appointed surgeon in the city's prisons; subsequently (1845–1847) he obtained a temporary post of theoretical surgery in Padua, after which he returned to France and to Belgium. When the 1848 uprising broke out, the Daniele Manin revolutionary government in Venice appointed him director of the hospital of Santa Chiara; on 27 August 1850 he became principal surgeon at the Civil Hospital, where he worked and taught until 1884. For a while he was a Town Councillor and worked on the Provincial Council; in 1889 he was appointed Senator. Eventually he was to become President of the Ateneo Veneto di Lettere Scienze ed Arti, He died in 1893, leaving money for the construction of the Ponte Minich bridge in Venice.

The casa Minich in Venice was acquired with his donation and named after his name in 1982. In 2019, it became the main location of the Veneto Institute for Cultural Heritage.
