= Domingo Pérez Minik =

Spanish writer

- Born: 24 May 1903
- Died: 24 August 1989 (aged 86)
- Awards: Gold Medal of Merit in the Fine Arts (1984)

Domingo Pérez Minik (Santa Cruz de Tenerife, 1903–1989), was a Spanish writer.

He was one of the personalities in Spanish critical literature of the 20th century. He initiated his literary activity on Tenerife's review Hespérides and confounded in 1932, in the direction of Eduardo Westerdahl, Gaceta de Arte, one of the periodical publications. He worked his critical literary and theatrical in all types of specialized publications. He received gold medals from Bellas Artes, del Cabildo de Tenerife, Premio Nacional de Teatro (National Theatre Awards) and Premio Canarias de Literatura. His books and archives were donated to the Biblioteca Pública del Estado de Santa Cruz de Tenerife and consists of 5,600 books, 1,183 maps, 167 titles and reviews, 300 photographs and documents.

Among the honors he has received are:

- Gold Medal of Fine Arts
- National Theater Award
- Canary Prize for Literature

== Literature ==
His famous works include:

- Antología de la Poesía Canaria (Canarian Poetry Anthology) (1952)
- Debates sobre el teatro español contemporáneo (1953)
- Novelistas españoles de los siglos XIX y XX (Spanish Novelists in the 19th and the 20th century) (1957)
- Teatro europeo contemporáneo (Contemporaneous European Theatre) (1961)
- Introducción a la novela inglesa actual (1968)
- Entrada y salida de viajeros (1969)
- La novela extranjera en España (1973)
- Facción surrealista de Tenerife (1975)
- Isla y literatura (Island and Literature) (1988)
