= Sergej Minich =

German politician (18 March 1987)

Member of the Bundestag
- Incumbent
- Assumed office 25 March 2025

Personal details
- Born: 18 March 1987 (age 39) Tokmok, Kirghiz Soviet Socialist Republic
- Party: Alternative for Germany

Sergej Minich (born 18 March 1987) is a German politician who was elected as a member of the Bundestag in 2025. He is the leader of the Alternative for Germany in Bremen.
