= Eduardo Westerdahl =

Spanish painter (1902–1983)

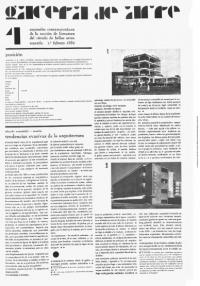
Número 1 de Gaceta de Arte

Eduardo Westerdahl (Santa Cruz de Tenerife, Canary Islands, 1902-ibidem 1983) was a Spanish painter, art critic and writer, and a member of the Surrealist Movement.

== Biographical notes ==
Westerdahl was born of a Catalan mother and Swedish father. His formal education was in business management and he earned his living as a bank employee.

His private interest in philosophy and arts led him to establish the publication Iletras y Pajaritas de Papel, and he was editor-in-chief of the art revue Gaceta del arte (est. 1932) which was at the forefront of European art and culture magazines.

Although he made notable contributions to several important publications, his lasting achievement was the establishment of Contemporary Art Museum Eduardo Westerdahl in Puerto de la Cruz (Canary Islands), considered to be one of the most important museums for contemporary Spanish art.

== Works ==
- Poemas de sol lleno (1928), poetry
- Will Faber (1957), art criticism
- Óscar Domínguez (1968) y (1971), art criticism
