= Canarian Americans =

Americans of Canarian birth or descent

canario -ria, isleño -ña

Total population
- 3,065 (Canarian ancestry, 2000 US Census)

Regions with significant populations
- Louisiana (mainly St. Bernard Parish, Ascension Parish, and Assumption Parish); Also cities of Baton Rouge, New Orleans, San Antonio, and Miami

Languages
- English • Spanish (Canarian • Isleño • Mexican) • Louisiana French • Spanglish

Religion
- Roman Catholic

Related ethnic groups
- Canarians, Guanches, Louisiana Isleños, Louisiana Creoles, Puerto Rico Isleños, Spanish Americans, Californios, Tejanos, Nuevomexicanos, Berber Americans

Canarian Americans (Spanish: Canarios Estadounidenses) are Americans whose ancestors came from the Canary Islands, Spain. They can trace their ancestry to settlers and immigrants who have emigrated since the 16th century to the present-day United States. Most of them are descendants of settlers who immigrated to Spanish colonies in the South of the modern US during the 18th century. The Canarians were among the first settlers of the modern United States; (Note: The first Spaniards who emigrated to Florida did so in 1565 and 1569. Among those Spaniards there were some Canarians. Florida was the first Spanish colony in the modern United States which was populated by Spaniards.) the first Canarians migrated to modern Florida in 1569, and were followed by others coming to La Florida, Texas and Louisiana.

Canarian Americans today consist of several communities, formed by thousands of people. Those in San Antonio and in Louisiana are mostly of Canarian settler descent. Their ancestors arrived in what is now the United States in the 18th century, while the Canarian community in Miami is made up of recent immigrants and their children. These communities are culturally distinct within the American population, having preserved much of the culture of their ancestors to present times.

Most Canarian Americans now speak only English, although some Canarian communities that speak different dialects of the Spanish language are still extant in Louisiana. These include the Isleños of Saint Bernard Parish who have managed to preserve their culture as well as their dialect of Canarian Spanish, although none of the younger generation speak more than a few words; the Brulis, who live in scattered households in southern Louisiana and speak a dialect with French loan words; and the Adaeseños in the Natchatoches and Sabine parishes who speak a very similar dialect with loan words from the Nahuatl language of Mexico. The success of Canarian Americans of settler origin in preserving their culture has led some historians and anthropologists, such as Jose Manuel Balbuena Castellano, to consider the Isleño American community a national heritage of both the United States and the Canary Islands.

== History ==
Canarian immigration to North America started in the 16th century, when Spain had several colonies stretching around the Gulf of Mexico. The first Canarians arrived in the region as early as 1539, when the Spanish explorer Hernando de Soto recruited Canary Islanders to join his expeditions to explore the wilderness of La Florida. The Canarian scholar Javier González Antón says some Canary Islanders went to Florida with Pedro Menéndez, who founded St. Augustine, the first permanent European settlement in what is now the United States, in 1565.

The other Spanish colonies in the large area (from present-day Virginia to Texas) then called La Florida remained lightly populated due to the scant attention paid to them by the Spanish government after it realized that these colonies lacked gold and silver mines and other sources of wealth. During the late 17th and much of the 18th century (1684–1764), the so-called Tributo de Sangre (Blood Tribute) was in effect; this was a Spanish law stipulating that for every thousand tons of cargo shipped from Spanish America to Spain, 50 Canarian families would be sent to America to populate regions having low populations of Peninsulares, or Spanish-born Spaniards. The Spanish crown sent several groups of Canarian settlers to its North American colonies, but the number of Canarian families immigrating to America usually exceeded the number of families called for by the regulations.

Between 1731 and 1783, many Canarian families immigrated to the southern colonies, establishing their own communities there. In 1731, 16 Canarian families were sent to San Antonio, Texas, most of them coming directly from the Canary Islands (some came from Havana). After arriving at Veracruz, they were forced to cross overland on foot to Texas, led by the Canarian Juan Leal Goraz, who eventually would become the first mayor of San Antonio. This community had confrontations with the resident Catholic monks of the area over property rights and the diversion of water from the rivers.

Between 1718 and 1734, Florida was governed by Lt. General Antonio de Benavides, a native of Tenerife in the Canary Islands, while Carlos Benites Franquis de Lugo and Simón de Herrera, both natives of Tenerife, governed Texas in 1736–1737 and in 1811 respectively.

In 1740, La Real Compañía de Comercio de La Habana (The Royal Society of Commerce of Havana), a monopolistic corporation formed to encourage commercial traffic between Cuba and Florida, was required by Spanish statutes to provide two vessels bringing 50 Canarian families annually to Florida. Between 1757 and 1759, 121 Canarian families were sent to Florida, (although most of the settlers immigrated to Cuba when the province was ceded to Great Britain after the Seven Years' War), followed by another 863 Canarian families in the years after the loss of the province, according to authors Carlos Canales Torres and Fernando Martinez Láinez. Florida was returned to Spain in 1783. When Florida was ceded to the United States in 1819, however, most of the new settlers also immigrated to Cuba, as happened in 1763, when Florida was ceded to Great Britain.

After the elimination of the Tributo de Sangre law, between 1778 and 1783 over 4,000 Canarians were sent to Louisiana, although half of them remained in Venezuela and Cuba where their ships had stopped over during the passage; some 2,100 Canarians settled in those places. In Louisiana, the settlers eventually consolidated into three communities: St. Bernard Parish, Valenzuela (where the Canarians intermarried with Cajuns and their descendants speak French), and Barataria (abandoned shortly after a hurricane struck, its settlers relocated elsewhere in Louisiana and Florida). In 1779, other Canarians were established in Galveston, Texas along with Mexican soldiers in the garrison, but after prolonged droughts interrupted by sudden floods, were resettled near Baton Rouge in 1800, where they founded Galveztown.

Other places in the southern United States had Canarian settlers during the Spanish period. A few communities were founded by Canary Island colonists in Southern California and there are records of Canary Islanders colonists and their descendants living in New Mexico in the 19th century.

Since they arrived in America in the 16th century, Isleños have played their part in some historic events: they participated in the American Revolutionary War (in 1782 – 83), fought in the War of 1812 (in 1814), defended the Alamo (in 1836), and after the incorporation of Louisiana and Texas into the United States, they fought in the American Civil War (1861–1865), both World Wars and the Vietnam War. Remarkably, in the 1950s, the local government forced all students of the Saint Bernard Parish school system in Louisiana to speak only English, while Hispanics in the parish were not even allowed to speak Spanish in public; eventually there were no Spanish language-speakers left in the local Isleño community.

Beginning early in the 20th century, a different sort of Canarian immigration to America has taken place, primarily to Florida, of migrants not officially sanctioned or subsidized, but coming by their own means. Many Canarians live in the United States temporarily as migrant workers.

== Communities ==
Several Canarian American communities remain in the southern United States: there are Isleño communities in Saint Bernard Parish, Brulis in scattered households in southern Louisiana, and the Adaeseños in the Natchatoches and Sabine parishes, as well as a Canarian community in San Antonio, Texas. The city of Miami, Florida has a Canarian community of recent immigrants. There are also Canarians living in Boston, Massachusetts, New York, New Jersey, Washington D.C., and California. Currently, according to data of the Padrón de Españoles Residentes en el Extranjero (PERE; Register of Spaniards Resident Abroad), released on March 20, 2014, by the National Statistics Institute (INE), in 2013, there were 5,127 Canarians living in the United States.

Canarian culture in San Antonio and Louisiana has been preserved up to the present day, although not in Florida. (Note: Although the Canarians promoted agriculture in the province of Florida, most Canarian settlers there immigrated to Cuba when the province was ceded to Great Britain in 1763. Some of them returned when Florida was recovered by Spain in 1783. When Florida was ceded to the United States in 1819, most of the Canarian population of colonial origin immigrated to Cuba, just as they had done when Florida had been ceded to Great Britain. However, after 1819, a new Canarian immigration to Florida began when it was ceded to the United States.)

=== Isleños in Louisiana ===
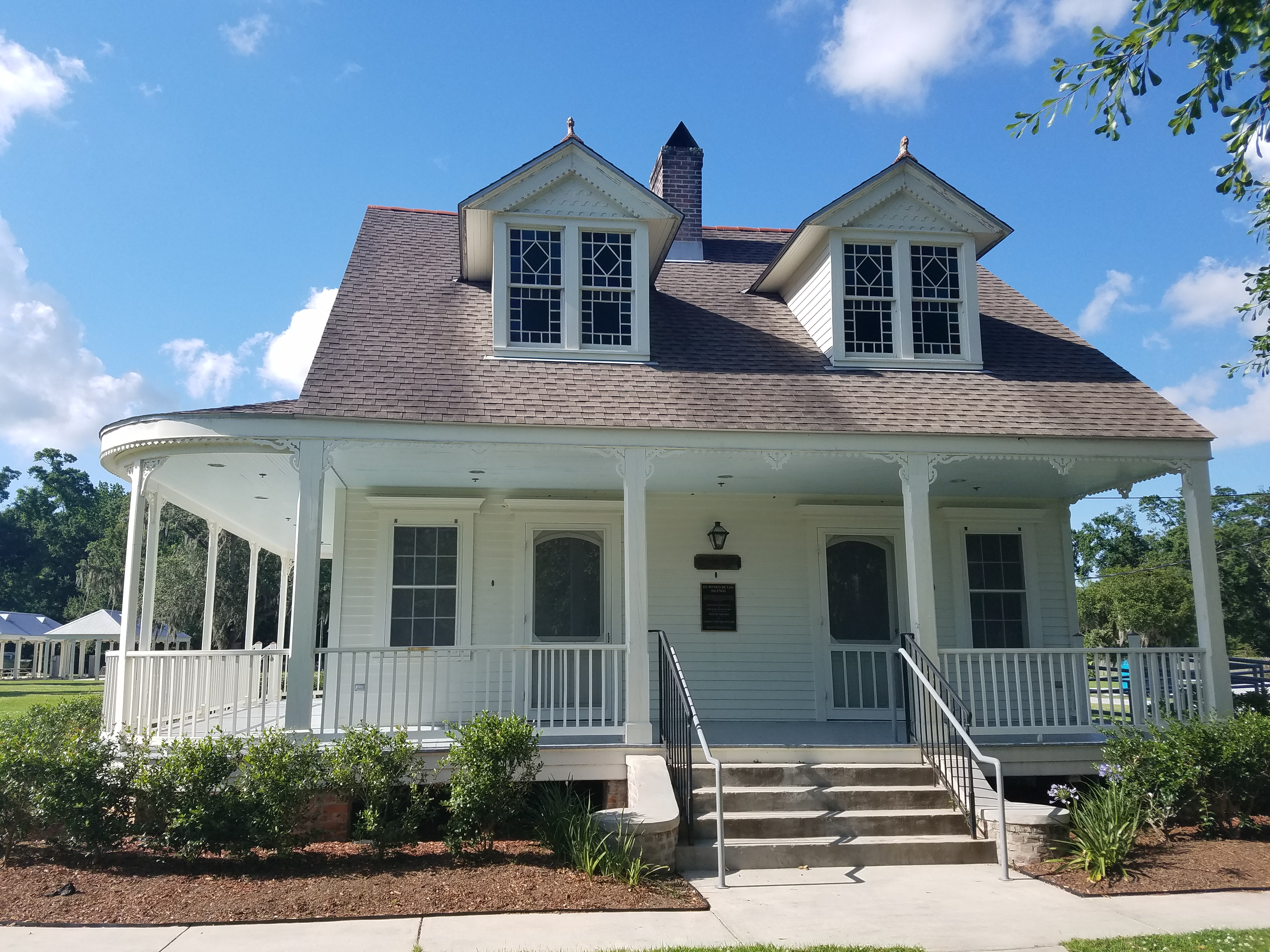
El Museo de los Isleños (Isleño Museum) in Saint Bernard

Its members are descendants of colonists from the Canary Islands who settled in Spanish Louisiana between 1778 and 1783 and intermarried with other communities such as Frenchman, Acadians, Creoles, Filipinos, and other groups, mainly through the 19th and early 20th centuries. In Louisiana, the Isleños originally settled in four communities which included Galveztown, Valenzuela, Barataria, and San Bernardo. Of those settlements, Valenzuela and San Bernardo were the most successful as the other two were plagued with both disease and flooding. The large migration of Acadian refugees to Bayou Lafourche led to the rapid gallicization of the Valenzuela community, sometimes referred to as the Brulis/Brules or brule dwellers, while the community of San Bernardo (Saint Bernard) was able to preserve much of its unique culture and language into the 21st century. This being said, the transmission of Spanish and other customs has completely halted in St. Bernard with those having competency in Spanish being octogenarians.

Regardless, these communities have garnered attention from notable academics such as Samuel G. Armistead and Manuel Alvar. In recent years, heritage groups have been formed for the Isleños and their descendants to help preserve their ways of life. The success of the Isleños in Louisiana and Texas in preserving their culture has led some historians and anthropologists, such as José Manuel Balbuena Castellano, to consider the Isleño community as part of the national heritage of the United States and the Canary Islands. Today two heritage associates exist for the communities: Los Isleños Heritage and Cultural Society of St. Bernard as well as the Canary Islanders Heritage Society of Louisiana.

=== Canary Islanders and the founding of San Antonio, Texas ===
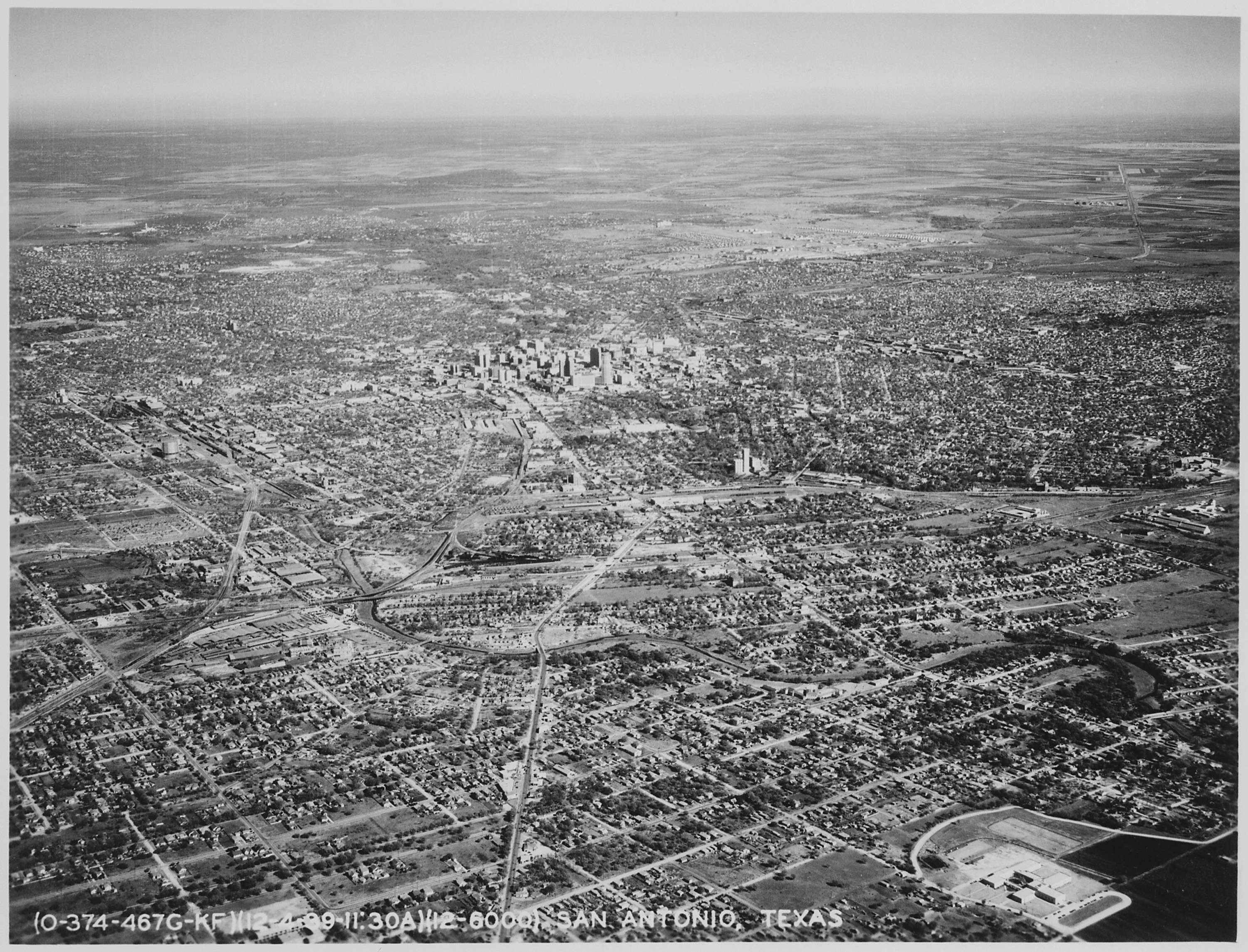
Aerial view of the city, San Antonio, December 4, 1939

On February 14, 1719, the governor of Texas, José de Azlor, made a proposal to King Philip V of Spain that 400 families be transported from the Canary Islands, Galicia, and Havana to populate the province of Texas. His plan was approved, and notice was given to the Canary Islanders (Isleños) to provide 200 families for the venture; the Council of the Indies suggested that 400 families should be sent from the Canaries to Texas by way of Havana and Veracruz.

Before the arrival of the Canarian settlers in 1730, the San Pedro channel was built for the exclusive use of the Canary Island colonists. It was called the acequia madre, the "mother ditch" that crossed the city. Its waters irrigated agricultural fields around San Antonio from that time until 1906. The last channel to supply water to the citizens was dug in 1777 for the new settlers of Los Adaes, and its remains can still be seen. American historical research indicates that Canarian irrigation practices in the San Antonio colonial period can only be understood in the context of traditional irrigation practices developed over thousands of years by the settlers' ancestors in the Canary Islands.

By June 1730, twenty-five families had reached Cuba and ten families had been sent on to Veracruz before orders from Spain arrived to stop the movement. Most of these Canarians were from Lanzarote, Tenerife, Gran Canaria and La Palma. Under the leadership of Juan Leal Goraz, the group marched overland to the Presidio San Antonio de Bexar.

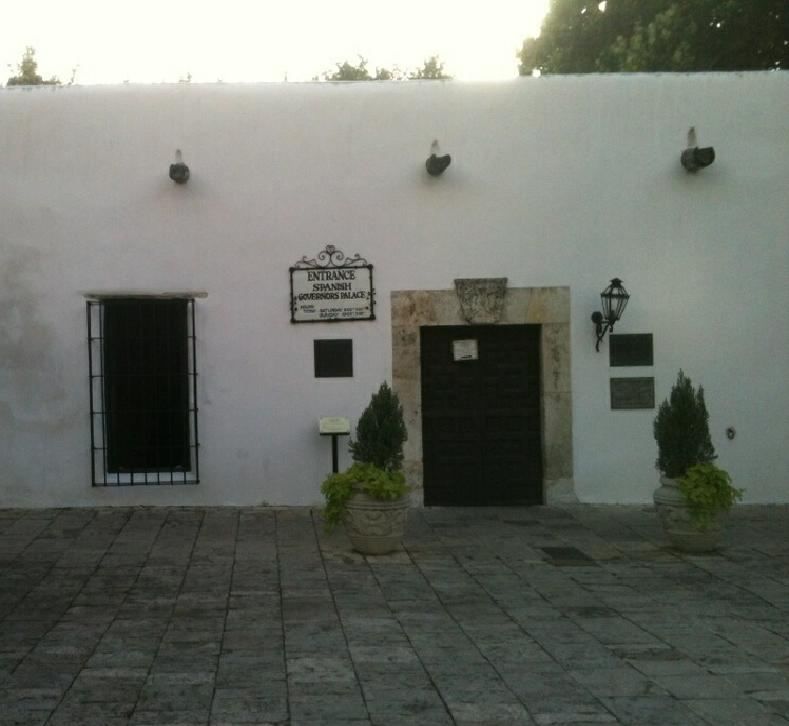
Presidio San Antonio de Bexar, San Antonio (Texas)

The party had increased by marriages on the way to fifteen families, a total of fifty-six persons. They joined a military community that had been in existence since 1718. At eleven o'clock in the morning on March 9, 1731, sixteen Spanish families (56 people), often referred to as the "Canary Islanders" or "Isleños", arrived at the Presidio of San Antonio de Bexar in the Province of Texas. These settlers formed the nucleus of the village of San Fernando de Béxar, and established the first regularly organized civil government in Texas.

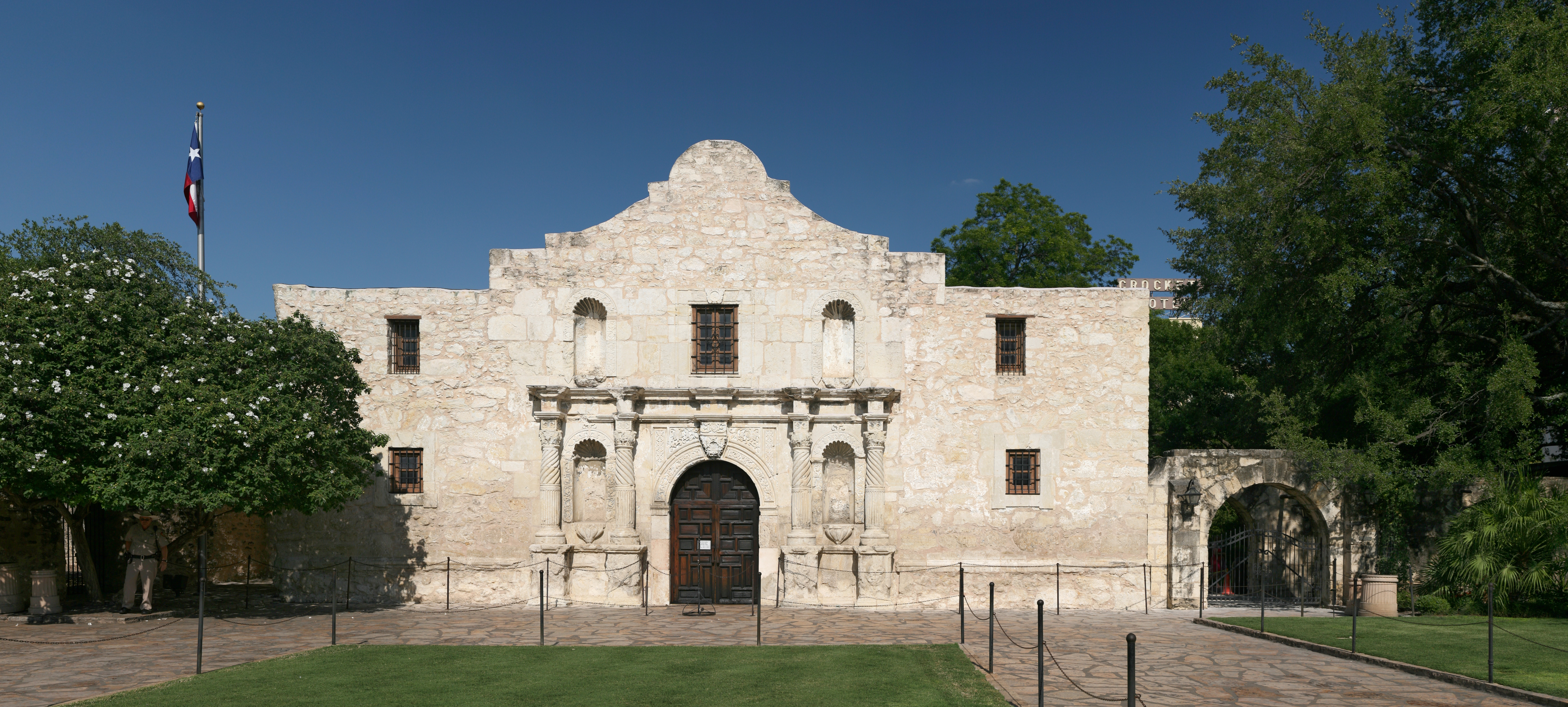
Misión de San Antonio de Valero, San Antonio (Texas). The Alamo Mission was founded to serve the spiritual needs of the Canarian settlers.

Juan de Acuña, Viceroy of New Spain, bestowed titles of nobility on each Canary Island family. After arriving in San Antonio, the Isleños had problems with the Texas government and the local bourgeoisie. The Franciscan friars were opposed to their founding a town so near their area of influence. The Canarians competed with them in raising crops and livestock, and their success threatened the order's own production, which had increased dramatically with the labor of Native American converts to Catholicism. The missionaries demanded that the settlers be distributed evenly among all the missions in the territory. Juan Leal, mayor of the city, refused the friars' request and decided in favor of the Canarians.

The Isleños had no access to water from the San Antonio River for irrigating the land they farmed, as it was reserved for use by the missions. The stream of San Pedro had been used by the Canarians of San Antonio since their arrival, but in 1732 the Cabildo wrote to the Viceroy stating that the volume of water was not enough to irrigate their fields and their crops were dying. In response, the Viceroy suggested in his order that the waters of San Antonio be divided proportionately between the missions and the settlers. An official inspection found that the water flow was plentiful enough to supply the missions and the villa. The tension between the missions and the settlers continued for some time, and later focused on land grant issues as well as irrigation.

Fourteen years after the founding of San Antonio, the non-Isleño settlers complained that the stranglehold the Canarians had on local politics was tightening to the point of depriving them of water for their homes. In 1736, the first canal was dug to distribute the waters of the San Antonio River for irrigation. Antonio Rodríguez Medero and Governor Carlos Benites Franquis de Lugo had a part in passing legislation enabling development of an irrigation system for the settlers. The Isleños irrigated their farms using the age-old techniques of their homeland.

Their irrigation problems were resolved for a while with the construction of the Acequia de San Pedro, completed in 1741, but as their water supplies decreased, Alvarez Travieso, in his position as Alguacil Mayor, was compelled to initiate several lawsuits from 1756 to 1771, until the Isleños were allowed full access to land ownership and water rights. The Canarians had to compete not only with the missions, but also with new Spanish and Mexican settlers arriving in San Antonio in the second half of the 18th century, who felt marginalized because appointments to positions in the Cabildo, which had been created by the Canarians, were monopolized by them.

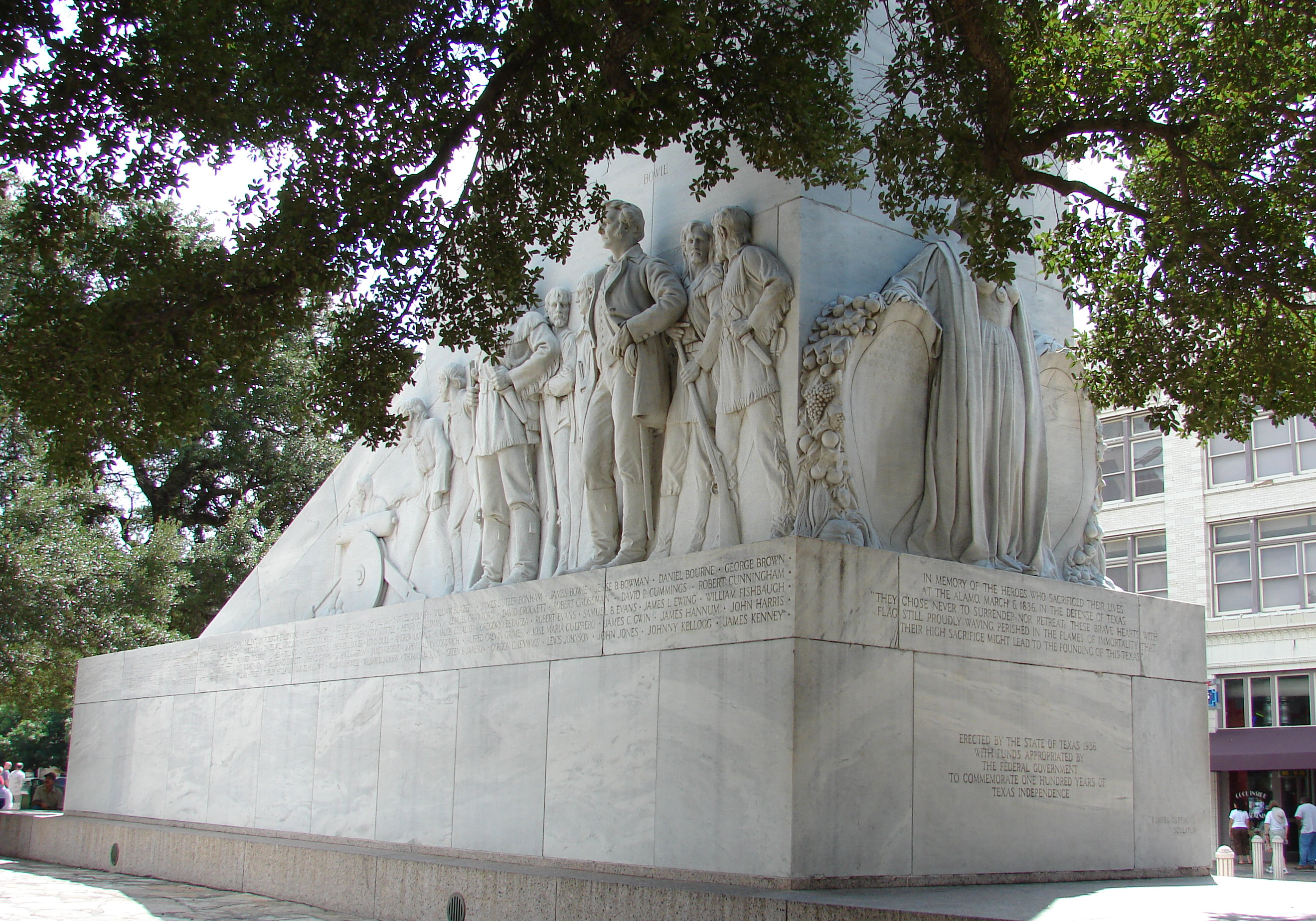
Memorial to the Alamo defenders

San Antonio grew to become the largest Spanish settlement in Texas, and for most of its history it was the capital of the Spanish and later the Mexican province of Tejas. From San Antonio, the Camino Real (today Nacogdoches Road) in San Antonio ran to the Mexico–United States border near the small frontier town of Nacogdoches. In the Battle of the Alamo fought from February 23 to March 6, 1836, the outnumbered Texan forces were ultimately defeated, and all of the Alamo's defenders were killed. There were Canary Islanders and Canarian descendants among these men, who were seen as martyrs for the cause of Texas freedom. "Remember the Alamo" became a rallying cry for the Texans' struggles to defeat Santa Anna's army.

There were a few descendants of Canary Islanders in San Antonio who joined the Mexican army to oppose Texas' independence from Mexico, such as the soldier and landowner Juan Moya. Other Isleños supported the annexation of Texas to the United States, and the territory decided to join the union in 1845. The last persons in the San Antonio Isleño community to speak Spanish as their daily language died in the 1950s, though the culture is being kept alive (San Antonio Isleños who speak Spanish are now all descendants of intermarriages between Isleños and Mexican settlers who arrived during the Mexican Revolution).

Some 5,000 Isleños (the majority of them descendants of the original Canarian settlers) live in San Antonio, Texas. Several of the old families of San Antonio trace their descent from the Canary Island colonists. María Rosa Padrón was the first Canary Islander baby born in San Antonio. Currently, there are several Isleño associations in San Antonio, including the Canary Islands Descendants Association and the Fundación Norteamericana Amigos de las Islas Canarias (American Foundation of Friends of the Canary Islands), presided over by the Canarian cardiovascular medical specialist Alfonso Chiscano, whose aim is to strengthen the historical ties between Canarians and San Antonio.

The Oficina Comercial Canaria (Canarian Commercial Office) of San Antonio is maintained by PROEXCA, a public company attached to the Canarian Ministry of Economy, Industry, Trade and Knowledge, that works to promote commercial cooperation between Canarian Spanish businessmen and the state of Texas. The Oficina de Canarias in San Antonio is an initiative of Canarian universities, university foundations and the previously mentioned Friends of the Canary Islands.

=== Canarians in Florida and other places in the United States ===
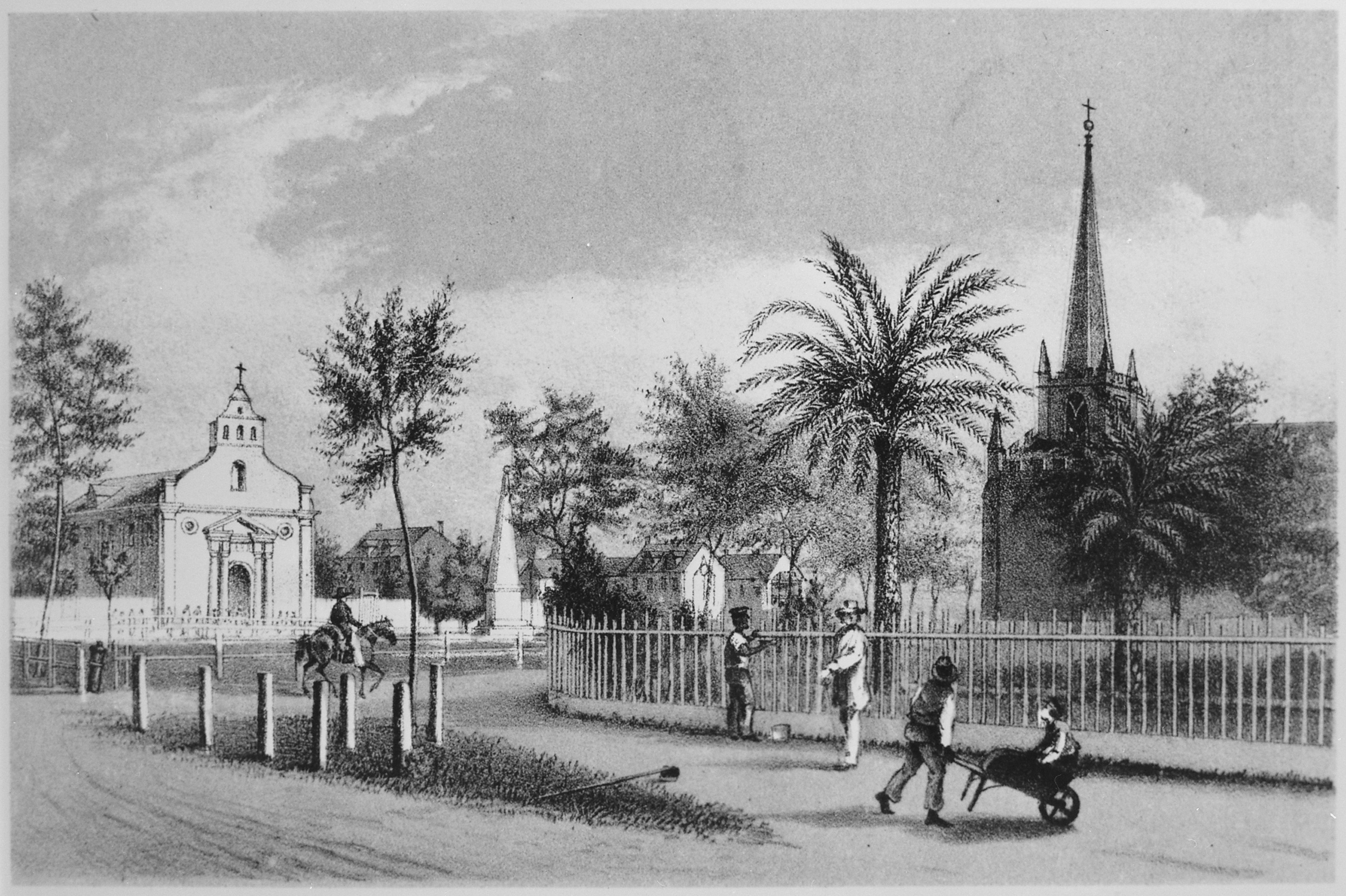
St. Augustine in 1858

In 1539, Hernando de Soto, funded in part by the Count of La Gomera, recruited sailors in the Canary Islands to man expeditions for the exploration of Spanish Florida. In 1565, the newly appointed Adelantado of Florida, Pedro Menendez de Aviles, organized two separate armadas, totaling more than twenty ships, which sailed from Asturias and Cádiz to the Canary Islands before continuing on to attack the French at Fort Caroline. According to Venezuelan writer Manuel María Marrero, in 1569 a group of 70 Canarian farmer families embarked from the port of Santa Cruz de Tenerife in the boats Nuestra Señora de la Soledad and Santiago with this destination. Nevertheless, colonial Florida remained sparsely populated, with most of the population living at the port of Saint Augustine, which was protected by a military fortress.

Lieutenant General Antonio de Benavides, a native of Tenerife, was appointed governor of La Florida in 1718 and governed there until 1734. On several occasions he repelled the English who were trying to conquer Florida by land and sea, and suppressed pirate raids. He also managed to secure a peace treaty with the neighboring Native American tribal groups who had been inimical to the Spanish colony, and maintained friendly relations with them as long as he was governing the colony. Benavides defended the rights of the indigenous peoples, allowing no distinction between classes or persons, and consequently was respected by Native Americans and Spaniards in the presidio alike. Benavides was one of three Canarian governors of a province now in the United States (the others were Carlos Benites Franquis de Lugo and Simón de Herrera, both in Texas).

In 1740, due to the depopulation of much of Florida, La Real Compañía de Comercio de La Habana (The Royal Society of Commerce of Havana), a monopolistic corporation that tried to encourage commercial traffic between Cuba and Florida, was required by Spanish statutes to annually provide two vessels bringing 50 Canarian families to Florida to counter aggressive moves southward by English colonists to the north. For a decade Canarian families were sent to Florida at a rate of about fifty families per year. These were peasant families to which were provided seeds for one or two crops, animals, land and franchises for the export of agricultural products to ports north and south in Spanish America. Thus immigration was encouraged to the reportedly fertile lands.

Between 1757 and 1759, 121 families were sent to Florida (42 in 1757, 43 families several months after, and another 36 the following year). In 1763, after its defeat by Great Britain in the Seven Years' War, Spain was forced to cede Florida, causing most of its Spanish inhabitants to immigrate to Cuba, although a small Canarian community would be permanently established in the region, where they were considered innovators in agriculture.

According to the Spanish journalists Fernando Martínez Laínez and Carlos Canales Torres (who examined the Spanish history of the United States in his book Banderas lejanas: La exploración, conquista y defensa por España del territorio de los actuales Estados Unidos), after the cession of Florida to Great Britain, many more Canarian families immigrated to Florida. In the 47 years of Canarian immigration to Florida, of the 2,350 who wanted the Spanish Crown retained there, only 984 families migrated, most of them heading to Venezuela and the Spanish Antilles. In 1783, Spain recovered Florida and some of the Canarian settlers from Saint Bernard also immigrated to West Florida.

During those years, Vicente Sebastián Pintado, the Canarian cartographer, engineer, soldier and Surveyor General of West Florida, drew the "Pintado plan", a street map of Pensacola drawn in 1812, which included the position and size of the solares on which to build the church and other public buildings. He left a huge corpus of work consisting of maps and plans of streets, letters and documents vital to the complicated sale of land in Florida and Louisiana. In 1974 the Library of Congress in Washington, DC obtained the donation of the Pintado Collection work, a collection of about 1,500 documents stored in the Division of Manuscripts.

Florida was ceded to the United States in 1819, again causing the immigration of almost the entire Spanish population to Cuba, although once again, a few Spaniards remained in Florida. There is a recent immigrant community of Canarian people and their descendants living in Miami, within the greater Hispanic community. Many of these Canarians live there only temporarily for employment. The vice president of the council of Tenerife, José Manuel Bermúdez, estimated that more than 200,000 people from the Canary Islands live in Florida. Currently, Florida has a Canarian association, the Hogar canario de Florida (Canarian Home of Florida), located in Coral Way, Miami.

Some communities in Southern California were also founded by Canary Islanders. Numbers of Canary Island colonists and their descendants were recorded in New Mexico during the Spanish era of that state.

== Culture ==
The Isleño communities in Louisiana have kept alive their Spanish musical folklore and Canarian romance ballads, décima, and lyric songs of their ancestors. They also preserve in their oral traditions a wide variety of songs, nursery rhymes, riddles, proverbs, and folk tales, and still use common Isleño names for numerous animals, including birds, fish, and reptiles, as well as insects and trees. Some Isleños still practice traditional Canarian folk medicine, prayer healing, and witchcraft rituals.

=== Language ===
The Canarian dialect is gradually disappearing in Texas and Louisiana. By 1984, researchers of Isleño communities in the southern United States had recorded 82 hours of native speakers sharing information about them: (57 hours by Isleños, 10 hours by Brulis, 10 hours by speakers in Texas and 5 hours by Adaeseños from Los Adaes). In the case of the Brulis, Adaeseños and speakers in Texas, the material is mostly linguistic. On the other hand, interviews with the Isleños bear witness to a rich diversity of language samples, folk and popular literature. These communities have a wide variety of songs, nursery rhymes, riddles, proverbs, folk tales, folk medicine, prayer healing, witchcraft traditions and many Isleño names for birds, fish, reptiles, insects and trees. San Antonio Isleños now speak a Mexican dialect of Spanish as they are mostly the descendants of intermarriages between Isleños and Mexican settlers who arrived during the Mexican Revolution.

The Spanish Tradition in Louisiana, a scholarly book written by Samuel G. Armistead, with musical transcriptions and information gathered from this recorded material, was published to ensure their preservation over time. This Isleño material relates not only to the Canary Islands, but also to several other regions of Spain, as immigrants from these places have been coming to Louisiana since the 19th century and mixing with the Isleño communities.

Isleños travel to the Canary Islands every year to remember their roots and keep in touch with the land of their ancestors. In 1980, the Saint Bernard Isleño community built the Isleños Museum to preserve the local Canarian culture. It was badly damaged by Hurricane Katrina and demolished, but has since been completely restored and reopened.

== Notable people ==
- Carlos Baena, animator
- Manuel Cabeza, lynching victim
- Juanita Castro, activist
- Ted Cruz, politician
- Héctor Elizondo, actor
- Camille Guaty, actress
- Jeanette, singer
- Pepe Hern, supporting actor
- Tom Hernández, actor
- Maria Montez, actress
- Alberto Rivera, religious activist
- Génesis Rodríguez, actress
- Narciso Rodriguez, fashion designer
- Juan Verde, social entrepreneur

=== Isleños in Texas ===
- José María Jesús Carbajal
- Juan Curbelo
- Gaspar Flores de Abrego
- Ignacio Lorenzo de Armas
- Simón de Arocha
- Juan Leal
- Antonio Rodríguez Medero
- Juan Moya
- Salvador Rodríguez
- Vicente Álvarez Travieso

=== Isleños in Louisiana ===
- Page Cortez
- Albert Estopinal
- Joe Falcon
- Joachim O. Fernández
- Joseph Gonzales
- Louis H. Marrero
- Alcide Nunez
- Samuel B. Nunez Jr.
- Irvan Perez
- Leander Perez
- Matthew Randazzo V
- Junior Rodriguez
- Paul Sanchez

== See also ==
- Isleños
- Isleños Fiesta
- Criollo people
- Canarian people
- Canarian Spanish (dialect)
- Hispanics
- Spanish Americans
- Spanish language in the United States
- History of San Antonio
- Berber Americans
- Guanches
- Guanche language
