= Tejanos =

Texas descendants of Hispanic settlers

- Flag of Texas

Total population
- 9,530,419 (people of Mexican origin; 2020 Census)

Regions with significant populations
- Texas (especially El Paso, San Antonio, and South Texas), Louisiana (Los Adaes)

Languages
- Texan Spanish, Sabine River Spanish, Texan English, Spanglish

Religion
- Predominantly Roman Catholic

Related ethnic groups
- Mexican Americans, Texas Germans, Louisiana Creoles, Adaeseños, Floridanos, Californios, Nuevo Mexicanos, Isleños, Cajuns, Texan Natives

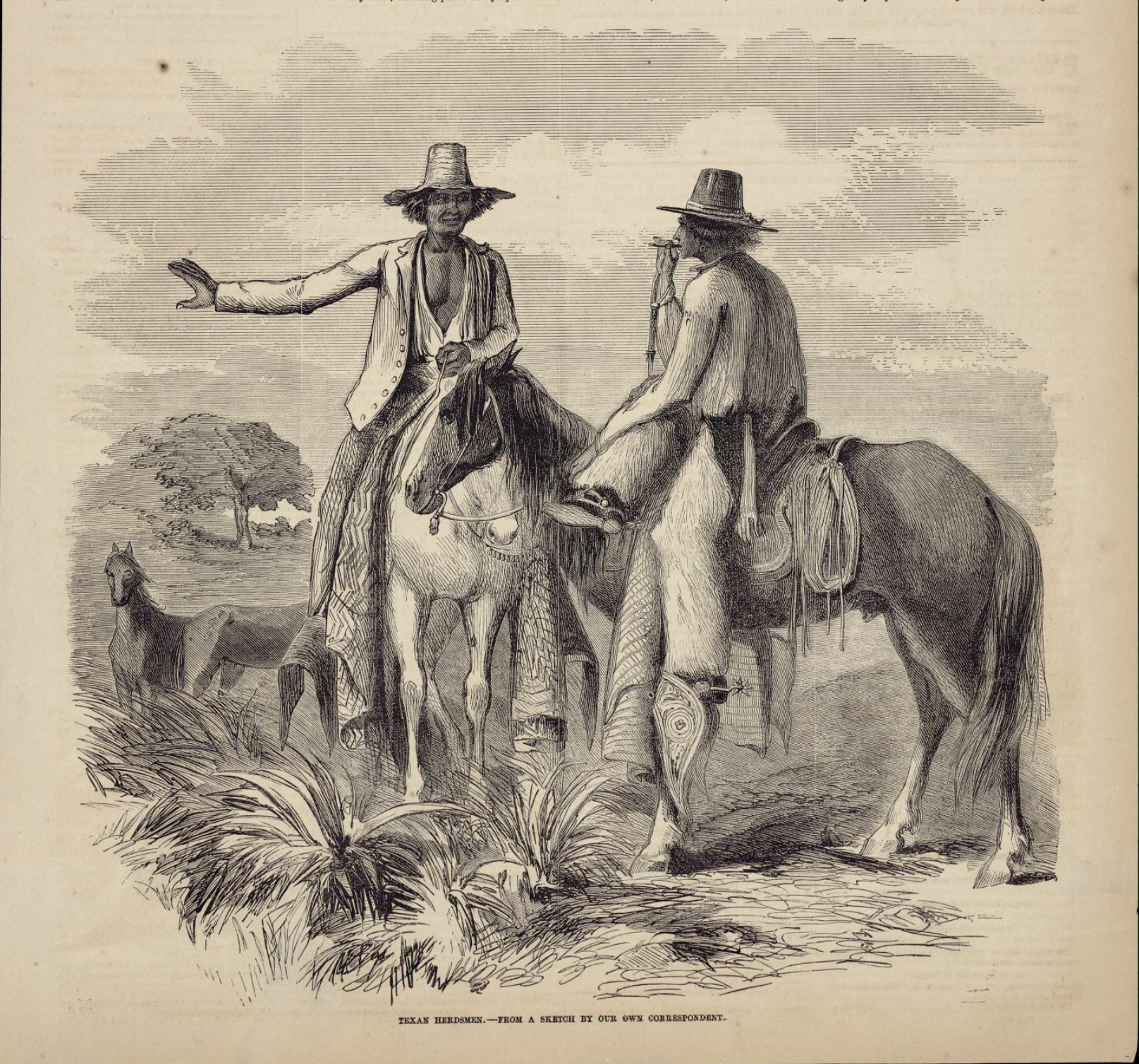
Tejanos (1859)

Tejanos (/teɪˈhɑːnoʊz/ tay-HAH-nohz, Spanish: [teˈxanos]; English: Texans) are descendants of mostly Native Americans and Spanish settlers, but also Texas Creoles and Mestizos who settled in Texas before its admission as an American state. The term is also sometimes applied to Texans of Mexican descent.

== Etymology ==
The word Tejano, with a J instead of X, comes from the Spanish interpretation of the original Caddo indigenous word Tayshas, which means "friend" or "ally". Texas Mestizo refers to a person born in the New World that has one Spanish-born parent and one Indigenous Mexican parent.

=== Texas Creoles ===
In colonial Texas, the term "Creole" (criollo) distinguished Old World Africans and Europeans from their descendants born in the New world, Creoles, who were the citizens of New Spain's Tejas province.

Texas Creole culture revolved around ranchos (Tejano ranches), attended mostly by vaqueros (cowboys) of African, Spaniard, or Mestizo descent who established a number of settlements in southeastern Texas and western Louisiana (e.g. Los Adaes).

Black Texas Creoles have been present in Texas since the 17th century and served as soldiers in Spanish garrisons of eastern Texas. Generations of Black Texas Creoles, also known as "Black Tejanos," played a role in later phases of Texas history during Mexican Texas, the Republic of Texas, and American Texas.

== History ==
=== Spanish government and Mexican Texas ===
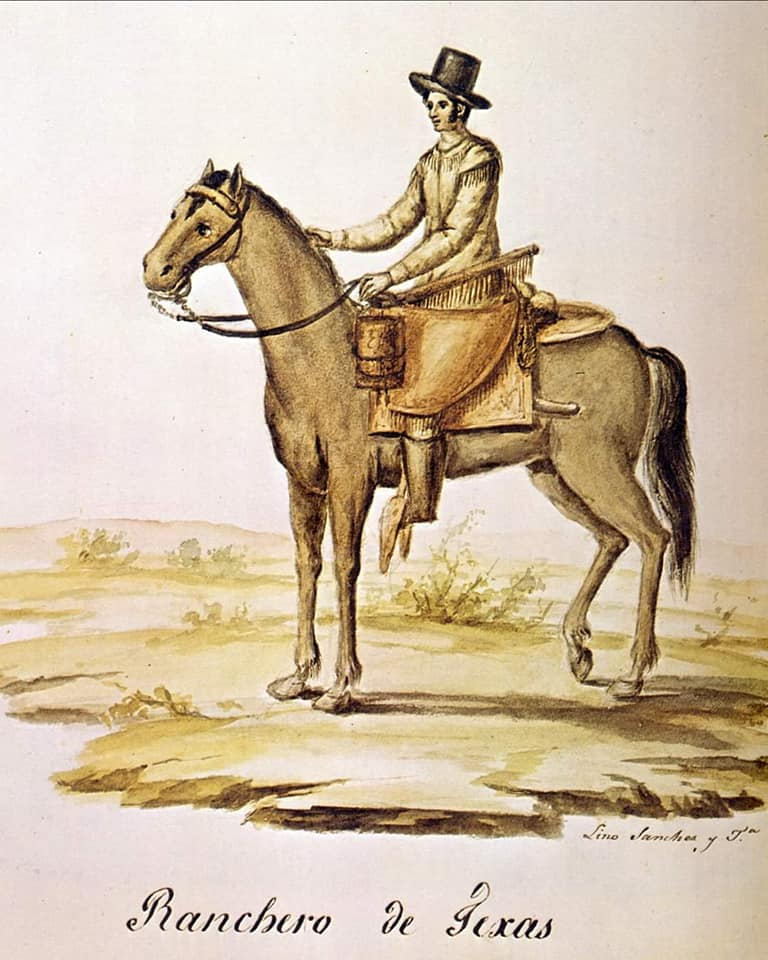
Ranchero de Texas (1828). Tejano vaqueros were very different from the Mexican vaqueros of central Mexico, both in their costumes and customs. Tejanos were very humble in their dress; their saddles, while being Mexican in origin, were rough and heavy and lacked the finesse of the central Mexico saddles. This changed once Mexican traditions were adopted by the Tejanos.

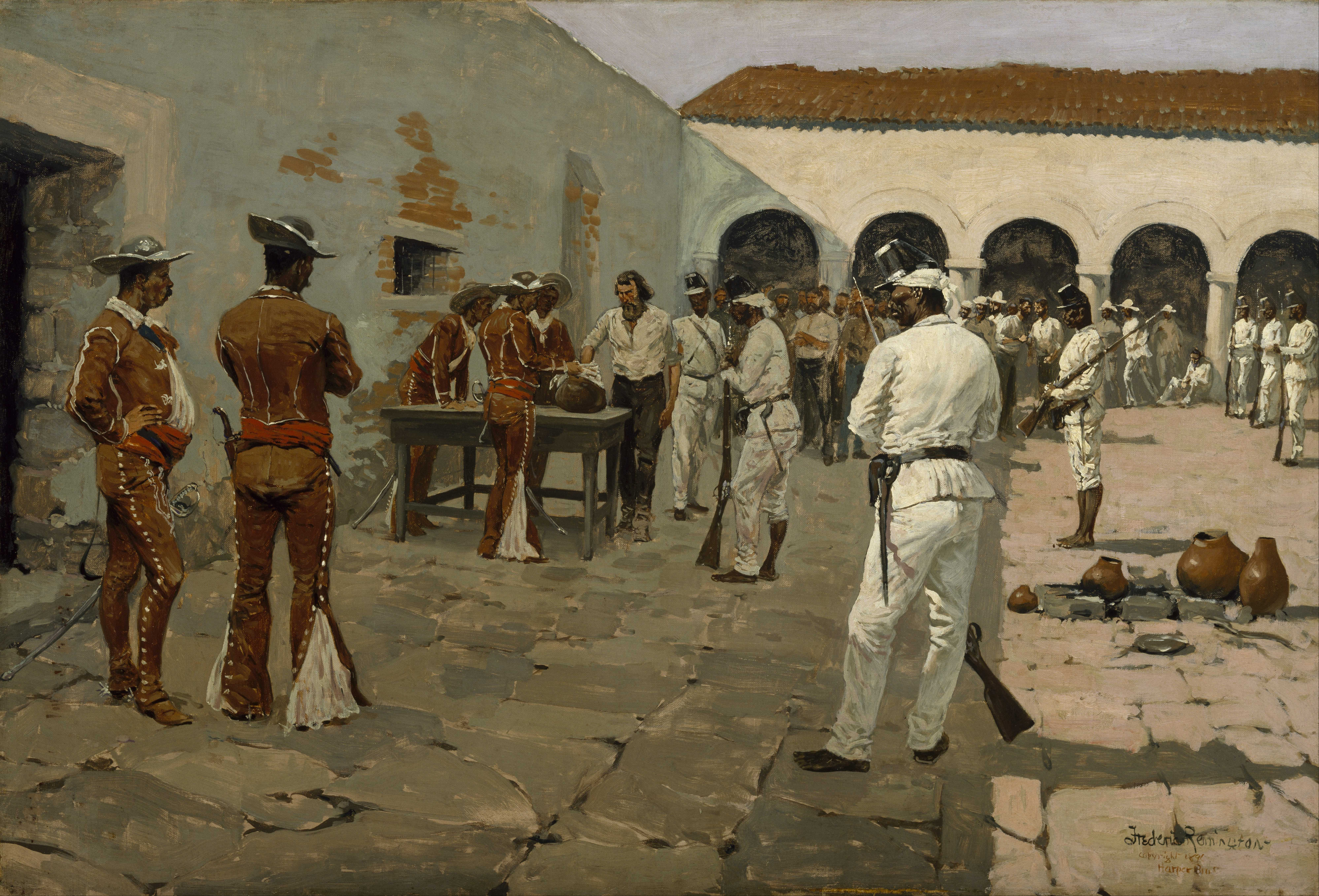
Spanish Creoles from Texas

As early as 1519, Alonso Álvarez de Pineda claimed the area that is now Texas for Spain. The Spanish monarchy paid little attention to the province until 1685. That year, the Crown learned of a French colony in the region and worried that it might threaten Spanish colonial mines and shipping routes. King Charles II sent ten expeditions to find the French colony, but they were unsuccessful. Between 1690 and 1693, expeditions were made to the Texas region and acquired better knowledge of it for the provincial government and the settlers, who came later.

Tejano settlements developed in three distinct regions: the northern Nacogdoches region, the Bexar–Goliad region along the San Antonio River, and the frontier between the Nueces River and the Rio Grande, an area used largely for ranching. Those populations shared certain characteristics, yet they were independent of one another. The main unifying factor was their shared responsibility for defending the northern frontier of New Spain. Some of the first settlers were Isleños from the Canary Islands. Their families were among the first to reside at the Presidio San Antonio de Bexar in 1731, which is modern-day San Antonio, Texas.

Ranching was a major activity in the Bexar-Goliad area, which consisted of a belt of ranches that extended along the San Antonio River between Bexar (San Antonio area) and Goliad. The Nacogdoches settlement was located farther north and east. Tejanos from Nacogdoches traded with the French and Anglo residents of Louisiana and were culturally influenced by them. The third settlement was located north of the Rio Grande, toward the Nueces River. Its ranchers were citizens of Spanish origin from Tamaulipas, in what is now northern Mexico, and they identified with Spanish Criollo culture.

On September 16, 1810, Miguel Hidalgo y Costilla, a Catholic priest, launched the Mexican War of Independence with the issuing of his Grito de Dolores, or “Cry of Delores.” He marched across Mexico and gathered an army of nearly 90,000 poor farmers and civilians. The troops ran up into an army of 6,000 well-trained and armed Spanish troops; most of Hidalgo's troops fled or were killed at the Battle of Calderón Bridge.

Bernardo Gutiérrez de Lara, a supporter in independence from Spain, organized a revolutionary army with José Menchaca, who was from the Villa de San Fernando de Bejar. After Hidalgo's defeat and execution, Gutiérrez traveled to Washington, DC, to request help from the United States. He requested an audience with President James Madison but was refused. He met with Secretary of State James Monroe, who was busy planning the invasion of Canada in the War of 1812. On December 10, 1810, Gutiérrez addressed the US House of Representatives. There was no official help by the US government to the revolution. However, Gutiérrez returned with financial help, weapons, and almost 700 US Army veterans.

Gutiérrez's army would defeat the Spanish Army and the first independent Republic of Texas, "the Green Republic" was born with the Declaration of Independence. Spain had reinforced its armies in the colonies, and a well-equipped army led by General Juaquin de Arredondo known as the "El Carnicero," invaded the Green Republic of Tejas. During the time of the Republic, the Spaniard José Álvarez de Toledo y Dubois had been undermining Gutiérrez de Lara's government. Toledo was successful, and Gutiérrez was ousted. Toledo then led the Republican Army of the North (the Green Army) into a trap against the Spanish Army, and no prisoners were taken by the Spanish at the Battle of Medina. The Spanish Army marched into San Antonio, rounded up everyone it could find from Nacogdoches to El Espiritu de Santo (Goliad), and brought them to San Antonio. The Spanish killed four males a day for 270 days, eradicated the Tejano population, and left the women when they left in 1814. Toledo returned to Spain, a Spanish hero.

In January 1840, the northern Mexican states of Nuevo León, Coahuila, and Tamaulipas seceded from Mexico to establish the Republic of the Rio Grande, with its capital in what is now Laredo, Texas; however, they became part of Mexico again in November 1840.

=== Republic of Texas ===
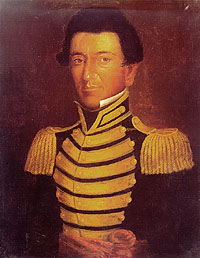
Juan Seguín, Tejano leader of the Texas Revolution and statesman in the Republic of Texas

By 1821, at the end of the Mexican War of Independence, about 4,000 Tejanos lived in Mexican Texas, alongside a lesser number of foreign settlers. In addition, several thousand New Mexicans lived in the areas of Paso del Norte (now El Paso, Texas) and Nuevo Santander, incorporating Laredo and the Rio Grande Valley.

During the 1820s, many settlers from the United States and other nations moved to Mexican Texas, mostly in the eastern area. The passage of the General Colonization Law, encouraged immigration by granting the immigrants citizenship if they declared loyalty to Mexico. By 1830, the 30,000 recent settlers in Texas, who were primarily English speakers from the United States, outnumbered the Tejanos six to one.

The Texians and Tejano alike rebelled against attempts by the government to centralize authority in Mexico City and other measures implemented by President Antonio López de Santa Anna. Tensions between the central Mexican government and the settlers eventually resulted in the Texas Revolution.

=== 20th century ===
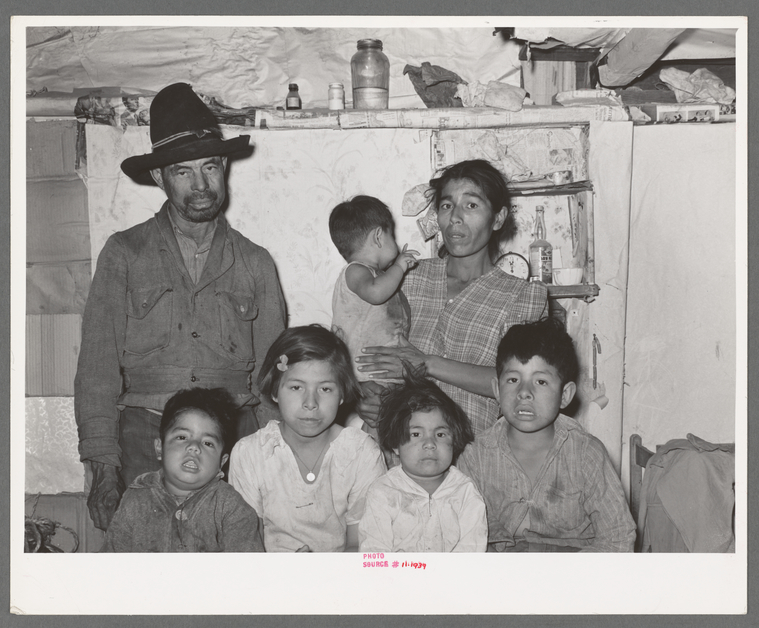
Tejano family in San Antonio, 1939.

In 1915, insurgents in South Texas wrote a manifesto that was circulated in the town of San Diego and all across the region. The manifesto "Plan de San Diego" called on Mexicans, American Indians, Blacks, Germans, and Japanese to liberate south Texas and kill their racist white American oppressors. Numerous cross-border raids, murders, and sabotage took place. Some Tejanos strongly repudiated the plan. According to Benjamin H. Johnson, middle-class Mexicans who were born in the United States and desired affirming their loyalty to the country founded the League of United Latin American Citizens (LULAC). It was headed by professionals, business leaders, and progressives and became the main Tejano organization promoting civic pride and civil rights.

Other sources attribute the founding of the organization in 1929 largely to Tejano veterans of World War I, who wanted to improve civil rights for Mexican-American citizens of the United States. They were socially discriminated against in Texas. Only American citizens were admitted as members to LULAC, and there was an emphasis on people becoming educated and assimilated to advance in society.

In 1963, Tejanos in Crystal City organized politically and won elections; their candidates dominated the city government and the school board. Their activism signaled the emergence of modern Tejano politics. In 1969–70, a different Tejano coalition, the La Raza Unida Party, came to office in Crystal City. The new leader was José Ángel Gutiérrez, a radical nationalist who worked to form a Chicano nationalist movement across the Southwest in 1969 to 1979. He promoted cultural terminology (Chicano, Aztlan) designed to unite the militants; but his movement split into competing factions in the late 1970s.

== Demographics ==
Most Tejanos are concentrated in southern Texas, in historic areas of Spanish colonial settlement and closer to the border that developed. The city of San Antonio is the historic center of Tejano culture. During the Spanish colonial period of Texas, most colonial settlers of northern New Spain – including Texas, northern Mexico, and the American Southwest – were descendants of Spanish speaking Native Americans.

Although the number of Tejanos whose families have lived in Texas since before 1836 is unknown, it was estimated that 5,000 Tejano descendants of San Antonio's Canarian founders lived in the city in 2008. The community of Canarian descent still maintains the culture of their ancestors.

Tejanos may identify as being of Mexican, Chicano, Mexican American, Spanish, Hispano, American and/or Indigenous ancestry. In urban areas, as well as some rural communities, Tejanos tend to be well integrated into both the Hispanic and mainstream American cultures. Especially among younger generations, a number identify more with the mainstream and may understand little or no Spanish.

Most of the people whose ancestors colonized Texas and the northern Mexican states during the Spanish colonial period identified with the mostly Native American, Spaniards, Criollos, or Mestizos who were born in the colony. Many of the latter find their history and identity in the history of Spain, Mesoamerica and the history of the United States. Spain's colonial provinces (Spanish Texas and Spanish Louisiana) participated on the side of the rebels in the American Revolutionary War.

=== Ethnic and national origins ===
In the 2007 American Community Survey (ACS) data, Tejanos are defined as those Texans descended from colonists of the Spanish colonial period (before 1821), mostly descended from Indigenous Spanish Mexicans, and indigenous Mexicans.

Tejanos have a unique cultural identity that is a mixture of Indigenous, Spanish, and African influences. Tejanos have made great contributions to the cultural heritage of Texas in terms of music, food, language, and traditions. The term "Tejano" has been employed to describe various expressions of culture and as an emblem of the unique heritage of Texans of Mexican descent over time.

== Culture ==
=== Music ===
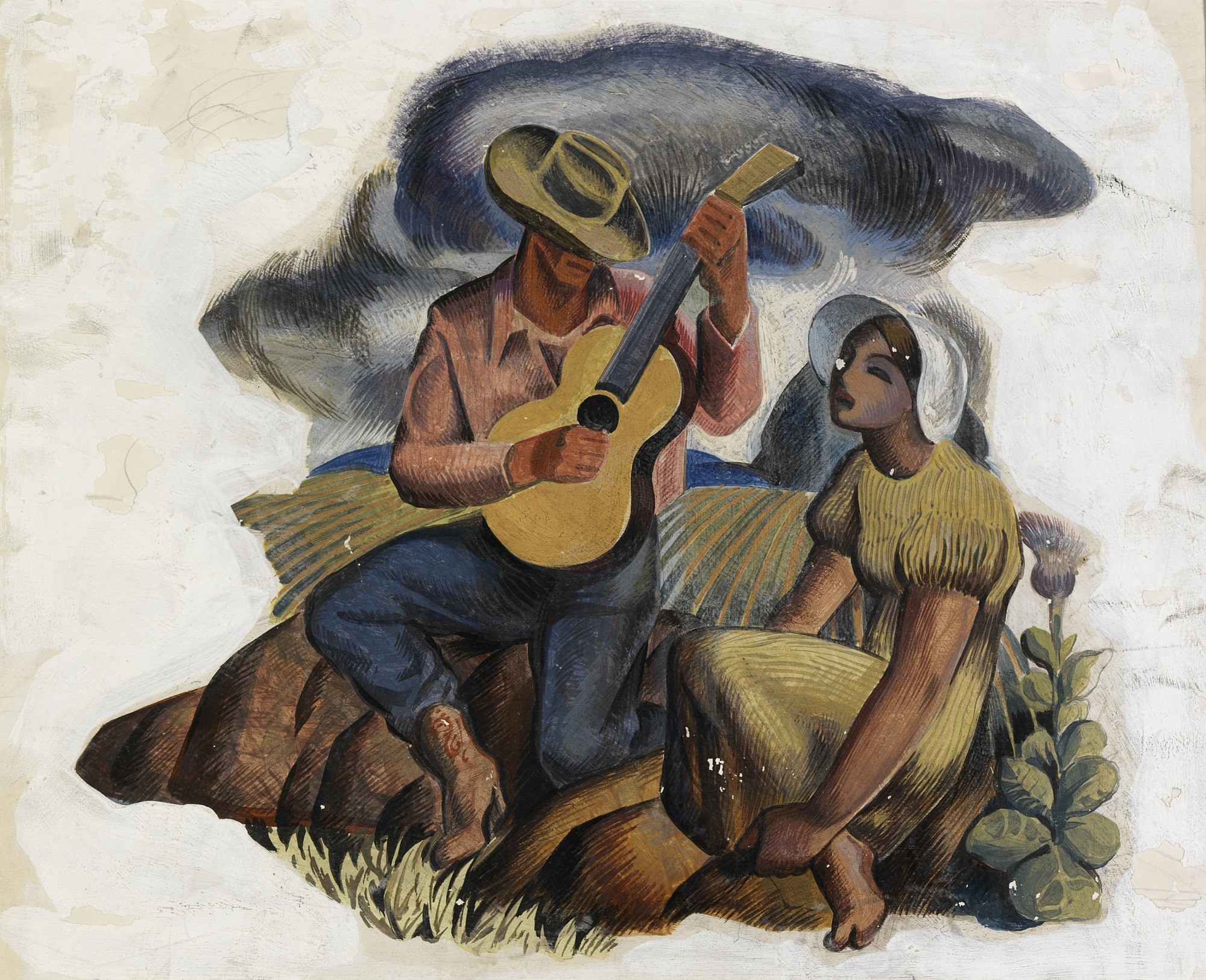
“Music of the Plains” (mural study, Kilgore, Texas, 1939) by Xavier Gonzalez.

Genuine Tejano music is descended from a mixture of German and Czechoslovak polka and oom papa sounds and Mexican Spanish strings, and is similar to the French folk music of Louisiana, known as "Cajun music", blended with the sounds of rock and roll, R&B, pop, and country, and with Mexican influences such as conjunto music. Narciso Martinez is the father of Conjunto Music, followed by the legendary Santiago Jimenez (Father of Flaco Jimenez).

Sunny and the Sunglows lead the rock and roll era in the 1950s along with Little Joe, and Rudy Guerra, who were originators of the rock and roll portion of genre. Today, Tejano music is a wide array of multicultural genres including rockteño and Tejano rap. The American cowboy culture and music was born from the meeting of the European-American Texians, Indigenous people, colonists mostly from the American South, Africans in the Americas, and the original Tejano pioneers and their vaquero, or "cowboy" culture.

=== Food ===
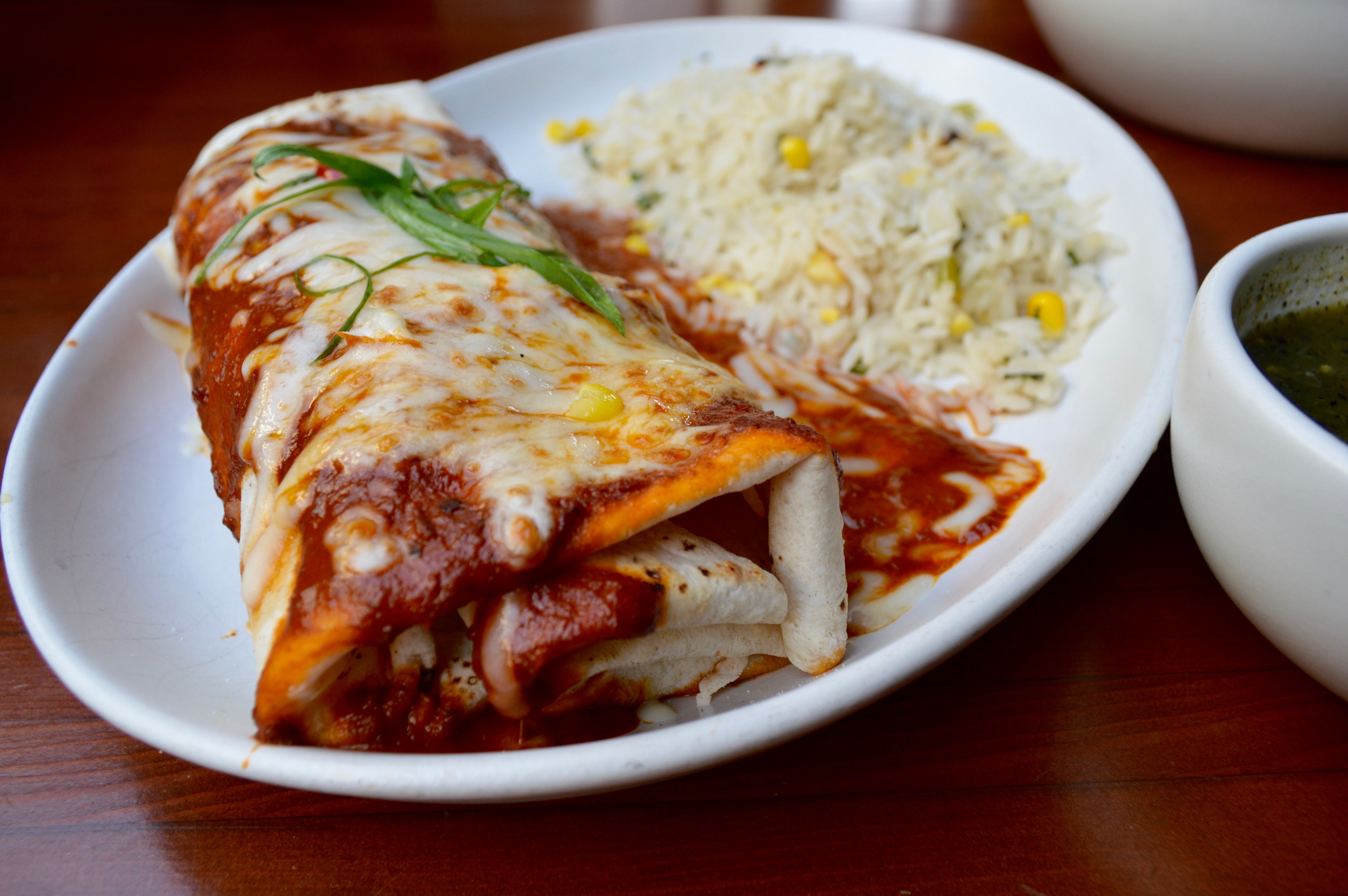
One of the most famous Tejano dishes, the burrito

The cuisine that would come to be known as "Tex-Mex" originated with the Tejanos. It developed from Spanish and North American indigenous commodities with influences from Mexican cuisine.

Tex-Mex cuisine is characterized by its widespread use of melted cheese, meat (particularly beef), peppers, beans, and spices, in addition to corn or flour tortillas. Chili con carne, burritos, carne asada, chalupa, chili con queso, enchiladas, and fajitas are all Tex-Mex specialties. A common feature of Tex-Mex is the combination plate, with several of the above on one large platter. Serving tortilla chips and a hot sauce or salsa as an appetizer is also a Tex-Mex development. Cabrito, barbacoa, carne seca, and other products of cattle culture have been common in the ranching cultures of South Texas and northern Mexico. In the 20th century, Tex-Mex took on Americanized elements such as yellow cheese, as goods from the rest of the United States became cheap and readily available. Tex-Mex has imported flavors from other spicy cuisines, such as the use of cumin. Cumin is often referred to by its Spanish name, comino.

A common Tex-Mex breakfast dish served is a "breakfast taco" and usually consists of a flour tortilla or corn tortilla served using a single fold. That is in contrast to the burrito-style method of completely encasing the ingredients. Some of the typical ingredients used are a combination of eggs, potatoes, cheese, peppers, bacon, sausage, and barbacoa. Breakfast tacos are traditionally served with an optional red or green salsa.

=== Religion ===
Tejanos, Mexican-American Texans, have always had their own special brand of Catholicism that addressed their cultural identity and survival. While they adhered to Catholicism's basic tenets, they practiced their faith in ways that went against institutional expectations. Tejanos were devoted to the Virgin Mary and the saints, and they diligently observed traditional holy days. Yet they also engaged in home altars (altarcitos) and selective sacramental observance, which were not necessarily in accord with official Church teaching. This was partially a response to the Church's historical neglect and discrimination against them. Despite such tensions, Tejanos' religious practice was deeply integrated in their social and cultural lives and was a means for them to assert identity and communal solidarity.

== Politics ==
Historically, the majority of the Tejano population in South Texas had voted for Democrats since the first half of the 20th century. The 2020 United States presidential election was considered a turning point in their political support, as part of a "red tide" for South Texas, where Republican candidate Donald Trump performed better in areas associated with Tejano population than during former elections. Zapata was the only county that turned majority Republican from Democratic in South Texas, while Starr County saw the strongest pro-Trump swing of any county in the U.S., a 55% increase compared to the 2016 election.

Tejanos are noted to be more supportive of the Republican Party than other Latino populations in Texas. Politically, Tejanos have been compared to Cuban Americans and Venezuelan Americans, who also disproportionately vote for Republican candidates among Latino voters. The New York Times attributed the relative success of Donald Trump among the Tejano community to concerns about regional economy, which is based on gas and oil. The Wall Street Journal described concerns about possible unemployment caused by COVID-19 lockdowns as another source of Republican Tejano support. Reporter Jack Herrera argues that Tejanos are culturally conservative and identify with Republican positions on gun rights, Christianity, and abortion. Tejanos are also more likely to be Evangelical Protestants than Roman Catholics, the latter denomination in which most Latinos across the US identify as being part of.

== Notable people ==
=== Tejanos of colonial origin or descent ===
- Gaspar Flores de Abrego
- Ignacio Lorenzo de Armas
- Simón de Arocha
- Rosa María Hinojosa de Ballí
- Santos Benavides
- José Tomás Canales
- José María Jesús Carbajal
- Henri Castro
- Josef Centeno
- Mariana W. de Coronel
- Juan Curbelo (Tejano settler)
- Juan José Elguézabal
- Blas María de la Garza Falcón
- Manuel N. Flores
- Salvador Flores
- Carlos de la Garza
- José Antonio de la Garza
- Rafael Gonzales
- Damacio Jiménez
- Juan Leal
- Eva Longoria
- Selena Quíntinilla-Pérez
- Antonio Rodríguez Medero
- Antonio Menchaca
- Juan Moya
- Ramón Músquiz
- Jose Antonio Navarro
- Antonio de Olivares
- Salvador Rodríguez (regidor)
- Francisco Antonio Ruiz
- José Francisco Ruiz
- Salvador Rodríguez
- Don Tomás Sánchez
- Juan Seguín
- Erasmo Seguín
- Vicente Álvarez Travieso
- José de Urrutia
- Jaci Velasquez
- Juan Martin de Veramendi
- Tomás Felipe de Winthuisen
- Antonio Gil Ybarbo
- Ignacio Zaragoza
- Lorenzo de Zavala
- Adina Emilia De Zavala

== See also ==
- Texians
- Hispanics
- History of Mexican-Americans in Texas
- Hispanic and Latino Americans in Texas
