= Tiziana Domínguez =

- Born: Tiziana Domínguez González; 16 November 1985 (age 40); Ourense, Galicia, Spain
- Education: Middlebury College
- Occupation: Fashion designer
- Spouse: Juan Verde (m. 2011; div. 2018)
- Parent: Adolfo Domínguez
- Relatives: Gala González (cousin)

Tiziana Domínguez González (born 16 November 1985) is a fashion designer and artist. As of 2011, she is the creative director of the company Adolfo Domínguez, as well as a painter and sculptor. She is the youngest of the three daughters of designer Adolfo Domínguez and Elena González. Tiziana is part of the third generation of the company, founded in 1973 from a tailor’s shop run by her grandfather.

== Training ==
Tiziana started her training abroad when she was seven years old. She studied in Great Britain, Austria and France, where she learned English, German and French. After finishing her A-levels in Great Britain, she studied a foundation course in Art & Design at Leeds College of Art. She later moved to Vermont, USA, where she earned a Bachelor of liberal arts BA with a major in economics in Middlebury College. In 2017, she earned a AAS fashion design degree at parsons.

== Design ==
From her post as Creative Director, Tiziana Dominguez designed the company’s collections, along with her father. She introduced ecological materials in all collections and backs sustainable fashion. In 2011, she presented her first 100% ecological line: ‘Green Me’, designer clothes made from organic and recycled fabrics.

== Painting and sculpture ==
In May 2011, she presented her first painting exhibition, "Ants, horses & other relatives". This was a figurative, expressionist collection, with a lot of colour, where she mixes oil paints with sand, coffee, sawdust, plants, insects and other materials. Her painting is inspired by animals and nature, and her canvases are often transferred to the prints in the collections presented at Cibeles Madrid Fashion Week and her sculptures inspire the designs of the company’s jewellery.

== Corporate ethics ==
In 2009, she founded the Corporate Social Responsibility Department (CSR) at Adolfo Dominguez S.A. Her achievements include the publication of the Animal Welfare Policy (2010). Through this document, the company rejects the use of exotic animal skins, as well as violent activities or animal abuse, such as plucking feathers from live birds or Mulesing. They only use leather for bags and accessories, provided that it has certification that it comes from animals bred for food.

== Personal life ==
Tiziana Domínguez was married to Juan Verde from 2011 to 2018. They have two children together.
