= Isleños (Puerto Rico) =

Descendants of settlers and immigrants from the Canary Islands

Isleños in Puerto Rico (English: Islanders) are the descendants of settlers and immigrants from the Canary Islands who settled in Puerto Rico. The term Isleño was used to differentiate them from the Peninsulare population of the island.

== History ==
The immigration of Canary Islanders to Puerto Rico mostly began in the late 17th century with the policy of tributo de sangre, which stated that five Canarian families would be sent to the Americas for every ton of cargo shipped from the colonies. Because of this policy, hundreds of Canarian families settled in Puerto Rico.

Many Canary Islanders also faced challenges at home such as poverty, leading many to get on ships set sail for the New World. Spanish authorities began offering free passage and land in the Americas, causing even more people to leave the islands. Terrible conditions on the ships caused people to get off at the first stop which was Puerto Rico.

=== Life in Puerto Rico ===
Canarians often settled in rural areas where they lived remotely, influencing the island's music, language and culture. These Isleños in interior and mountainous regions eventually formed what would become the Jíbaro culture. Places like Mayagüez, Añasco and Rincón were first settled by Isleños. Mayagüez was founded as Pueblo de Nuestra Señora de la Candelaria de Mayagüez (named after Our Lady of Candelaria in Tenerife)
