= Lisalla Montenegro =

Brazilian model (born 1988)

- Born: September 5, 1988 (age 38); Goiânia, Goiás, Brazil
- Spouse: C. J. Wilson (m. 2013)
- Children: 3
- Modeling information
- Height: 1.75 m (5 ft 9 in)
- Hair color: Light Brown
- Eye color: Brown
- Website: www.lisalla.com

Lisalla Montenegro (born 5 September 1988) is a Brazilian model who was born and raised in Goiás.

== Career ==
When Montenegro was 15, she competed in a beauty pageant, Miss Goias, in Goias, the Brazilian state where she was born. She was spotted by a talent scout and invited to come to New York.

In 2010, Montenegro signed with makeup brand Maybelline New York. She modeled lingerie lines for Wolford and Bloomingdales. She was chosen as a model for Victoria's Secret Pink. She has walked the runway and been photographed for advertising campaigns for brands including Hermès, Mario Sorrenti, Kenneth Willardt, Miles Aldridge, Michael Kors, Nina Ricci, and Armani.

Montenegro is a teetotaler.

== Personal life ==
Montenegro grew up in Goiânia, Brazil.

Montenegro met Los Angeles Angels pitcher C. J. Wilson and began dating in January 2012. They were married in December 2013. Her wedding gown was designed by Inbal Dror. The couple bought a five bedroom home in the Spyglass Hill neighborhood of Corona del Mar.

They have two daughters together. They had a son in 2021
