= Lynching of Manuel Cabeza =

Death in 1921 in Florida

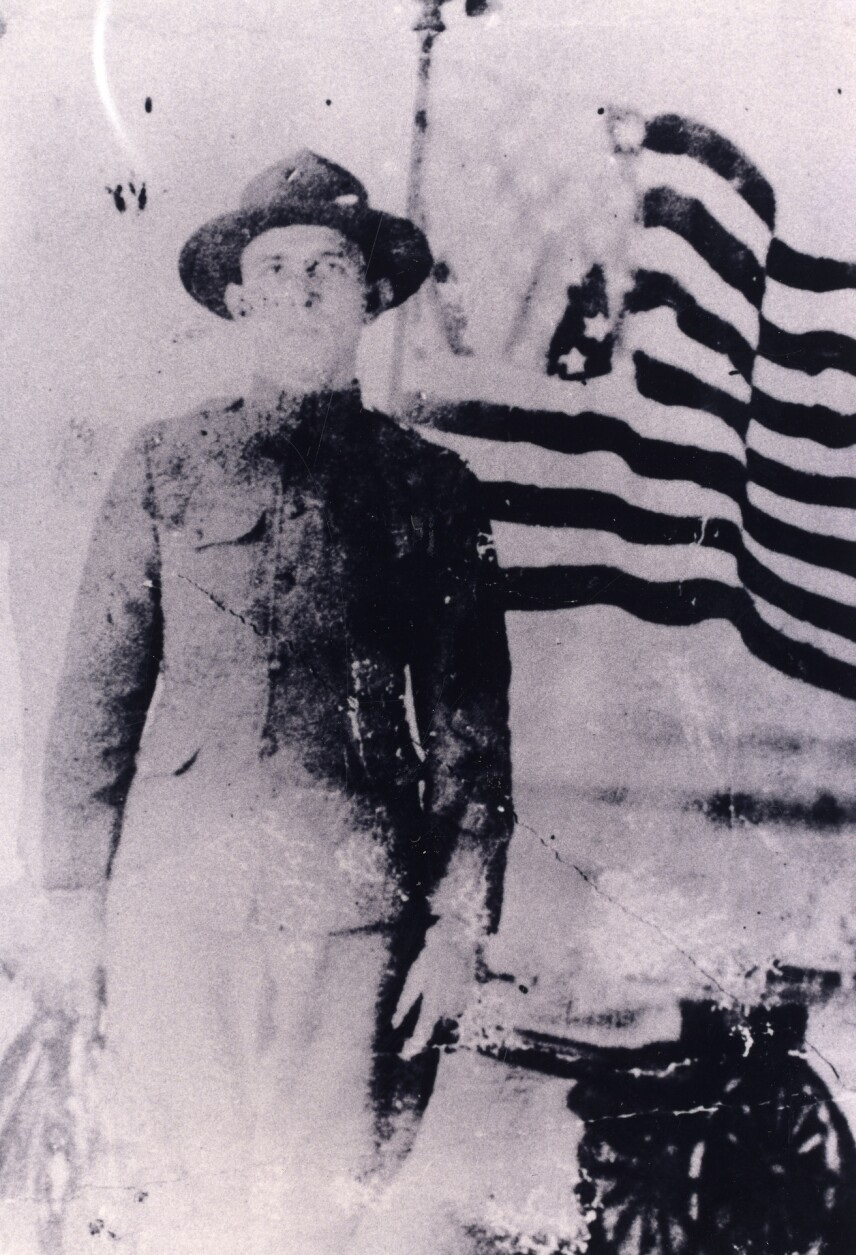
- Portrait of Manuel Cabeza in the US military
- Date: December 25, 1921
- Location: East Martello Tower, Key West, Monroe County, Florida
- Participants: A mob of 15 people
- Deaths: 1

The lynching of Manuel Cabeza (who is also referred to by his alias which is Manuel Head) occurred on December 25, 1921, when members of the Ku Klux Klan killed him. Two days earlier, they tarred and feathered him because he was living with a mixed race woman who was regarded as Black.

== Early life and military service ==
Manuel Cabeza's parents were born on the Spanish Canary Islands before they immigrated to Florida. In Key West, he was known as "Isleño," the Islander, and during World War I, he served as a private in Company B of the 105th Engineers. After he was ordered to report for military service during WWI, Cabeza trained at Camp Jackson, he was assigned the service number 1873913 and on the ship Talthybius, he departed for France as a private in Company B, 105th Engineers. His unit often came under fire while it was building railways and bridges. During fierce fighting, his unit was pushed back against a river, he was part of a group of volunteers that swam across the river with a rope so the other members of his unit could cross it. He left Europe on April 1, 1919, on the USS Martha Washington and he was honorably discharged later that same year.

== Lynching ==
During Prohibition, Cabeza illegally operated the Red Rooster, a bar, a coffee shop and a sporting club. It was located on Thomas Street near the waterfront. While he was operating the Red Rooster, he openly lived with a mixed race woman who was named Angela. This interracial relationship did not sit well in the Jim Crow South, and his dealing in liquor put him outside the law. On December 23, 1921, a group of hooded men loaded five cars, kidnapped Manuel Cabeza, beat him half to death, and tarred and feathered him. Cabeza recognized two of the kidnappers and hunted them down the next day.

Ex-soldier Cabeza was able to track down one of the kidnappers, William Decker, the manager of a cigar factory, and he was also able to shoot and kill him. After the public killing of Decker, he was arrested and detained at the local county jail in Jackson square.

For a while, Marines guarded the jail until Sheriff Roland Curry sent them home. On Christmas Day, December 25, 1921, not long after the Marines left the jail, a white mob of fifteen men burst into the jail and beat him with blackjacks. He was then dragged out of the jail, attached to a car and dragged through the streets of Key West to the East Martello Tower where he was hanged from a palm tree. The mob then riddled his body with bullets. A newspaper article published on December 26, 2021, reported that Manuel was forcibly removed from his cell at approximately 2:15 am. His body was reported discovered at 6:15 am.

== Aftermath ==
After his death, Angela, the mixed race woman who lived with him, allegedly used her voodoo religion to "curse" the Klansmen who killed him and during the next few years, they supposedly all died under mysterious circumstances. In 2019, the city of Key West gave him a memorial service and a military headstone. The service was attended by city officials and members of his family, including his 99-year-old niece.

Cabeza's lynching is referenced in Ernest Hemingway's To Have and Have Not. Also in Carl Hiaasen's Wrecker (Knopf, 2023).

== Bibliography ==
Notes

References

- Key West Weekly (March 28, 2019). "Dark History: Honoring Manuel Cabeza". Key West Weekly.
- Klingener, Nancy (March 25, 2019). "Key West Honors Manuel Cabeza Almost A Century After His Lynching". WLRN.
- Newton, Michael (April 14, 2016). A History of the Ku Klux Klan from 1866. McFarland. ISBN 9781476617190. - Total pages: 316
- McIver, Story Stuart (December 11, 1994). "Key West's Bloodiest Christmas". Sun-Sentinel.
- "Lynchers in Decker Slayer". Palatka Daily News. Palatka, Putnam, Florida: Vickers & Guerry. January 24, 1922. pp. 1–4. ISSN 0163-5050. OCLC 4402148.
