= Adolfo Domínguez =

Spanish fashion designer

- Born: Adolfo Domínguez Fernández; 14 May 1950 (age 76); A Pobra de Trives, Galicia, Spain
- Education: University of Santiago de Compostela
- Occupation: Fashion designer
- Labels: Adolfo Domínguez; Linea U; Golf
- Spouse: Elena González
- Children: 3; including Tiziana
- Awards: National Design Prize, 2014
- Website: www.adolfodominguez.es

Adolfo Domínguez Fernández (Spanish pronunciation: [aˈðolfo ðoˈmiŋɡeθ], born on 14 May 1950) is a Spanish fashion designer. In 2014, he won the National Designer Prize. Dominguez studied Philosophy and Arts, specialising in Art at Santiago University. As of 2023, the group operates 350 points of sale across 24 countries, with 53% of its network situated outside Spain. For the 2023–24 fiscal year, it reported a revenue of 114 million euros.

== Fashion business ==
He took over his father's fashion boutique in Ourense in the early 1970s. He spent the following years developing and trying out new designs, and he finally made the big jump with a presentation of his work in Madrid in 1981. He also became the first Spanish designer to open his own brand-name store in Madrid, which grew into a chain with outlets across Spain and abroad. The company went public in 1997. Adolfo Dominguez S.A. currently has a network of around 400 branches, 98 of which are outside Spain. Annual turnover around 182 million euros.

== Style ==
His perfume line is owned by Puig.
