= Isleños =

Inhabitants of the Canary Islands and their descendants who immigrated to the Americas

Isleños Islanders
Total population
- Canarian diaspora unknown

Regions with significant populations
- Venezuela: 42,671-600,000
- Cuba: 30,400-900,000
- United States: 37,008
- Argentina: 2,390
- Uruguay: 628
- Brazil: 620
- Dominican Republic: unknown
- Mexico: unknown (by ancestry), 1,600 (by birth)
- Peru: unknown
- Puerto Rico: unknown

Languages
- Spanish, English, French (in Louisiana)

Religion
- Roman Catholic

Related ethnic groups
- Canary Islanders, Guanches, Spanish, Portuguese

Isleños (Spanish: [isˈleɲos] meaning "Islanders" in English) are the descendants of Canarian settlers and immigrants to present-day Louisiana, Puerto Rico, Texas, Cuba, the Dominican Republic, Venezuela, and other parts of the Americas. In these places, the name isleño (Spanish for 'islander') was applied to the Canary Islanders to distinguish them from Spanish mainlanders known as "peninsulars" (Spanish: peninsulares). Formerly used for the general category of people, it now refers to the specific cultural identity of Canary Islanders or their descendants throughout Latin America and in Louisiana, where they are still called isleños. Another name for Canary Islander in English is "Canarian." In Spanish, an alternative is canario or isleño canario.

The term isleño is still used in Hispanic America, at least in those countries which had large Canarian populations, to distinguish a Canary Islander from a peninsular (continental Spaniard). By the early 19th century there were more people of Canarian extraction in the Americas than in the Canary Islands themselves, and the number of descendants of those first immigrants is exponentially larger than the number who originally migrated. The Americas were the destination of most Canarian immigrants, from their discovery by Europeans in the 15th century until the 20th century, when substantial numbers went to the Spanish colonies of Ifni, Western Sahara and Equatorial Guinea in Africa during the first half of the century. Beginning in the 1970s, they began to immigrate to other European countries, although immigration to the Americas did not end until the early 1980s.

The cultures of Cuba, the Dominican Republic, Puerto Rico, Venezuela, and Uruguay partially have all been influenced by Canarian culture, as have the dialects of Spanish spoken in all but Uruguay. Although almost all descendants of Canary Islanders who immigrated to the Americas from the 16th to the 20th century are incorporated socially and culturally within the larger populations, there remain a few communities that have preserved at least some of their ancestors' Canarian culture, as in Louisiana, San Antonio in Texas, Hatillo, Puerto Rico, and San Carlos de Tenerife (now a neighborhood of Santo Domingo) in the Dominican Republic

== General history ==
Isleño settlements in Louisiana

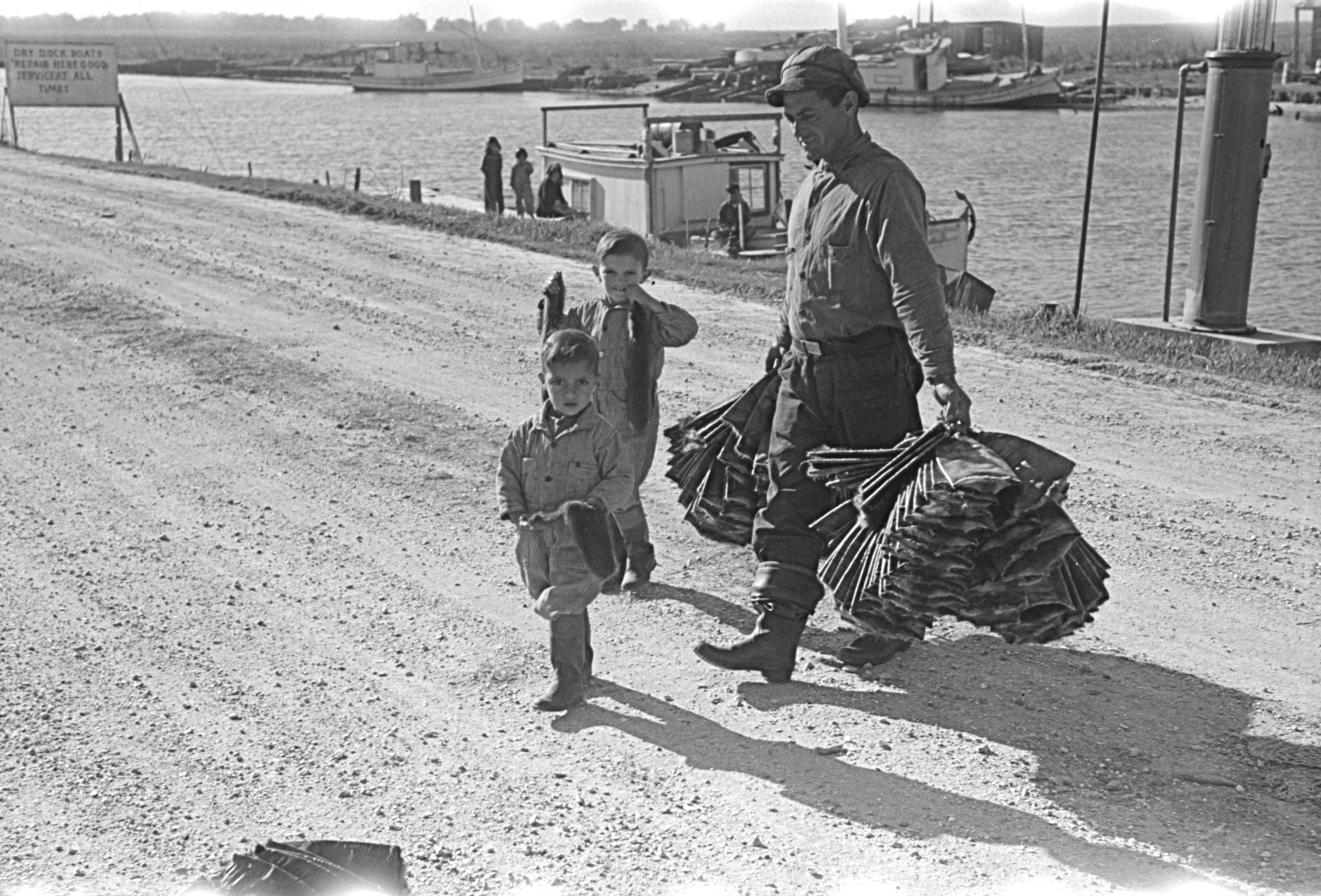
"Spanish" trapper and sons, Delacroix Island, 1941

The Canary Islander immigration to the Americas began as early as 1492, with the first voyage of Columbus, and did not end until the early 1980s. The Spanish conquest of the Canary Islands had only recently occurred (1402–1496), when Columbus made a stopover in the Canary Islands for supplies in 1501. Also in 1501 (possibly 1502), Nicolás de Ovando left the Canary Islands with a group of people heading to the island of Hispaniola.

In the first half of the 16th century, Spanish conquistadors, some of whom settled permanently in the Americas themselves, organized several groups of people chosen in the Canary Islands to colonize parts of Latin America including Mexico, Buenos Aires, Peru, New Granada and La Florida. There followed other groups who settled in Santo Domingo and Cuba in the second half of the 16th century. In 1611, about 10 Canarian families were sent to Santiago del Prado, Cuba, and by the Royal Decree of May 6, 1663, 800 Canarian families were sent to settle in Santo Domingo; it is assumed this was to avert the danger that the French might seize it.

In 1678, the Spanish crown enacted the so-called Tributo de Sangre (Blood Tribute); this was a Spanish law stipulating that for every thousand tons of cargo shipped from Spanish America to Spain, 50 Isleño families would be sent to the Americas to populate regions with low populations of Peninsulares. Consequently, during the late 17th and 18th century, hundreds of Canarian families moved to Venezuela, Cuba, the Dominican Republic and Puerto Rico, with others going to places like Uruguay, Mexico, Argentina or the south of the present United States. These families were sent to populate various parts of Latin America.

The Tributo de Sangre was finally abolished in 1764. Despite that, many Canarians continued to migrate to the Americas to escape grinding poverty at home. After the Spanish American wars of independence (1808–1833), Spain retained only Cuba and Puerto Rico as colonies in the Americas. It eventually abolished slavery in those colonies, and encouraged Canarian immigration. Most Canarian emigrants during this period went to the two Caribbean islands, where their labor was exploited and they were paid very little. There were, however, also thousands of Canarians who emigrated to other countries, including Venezuela, Uruguay and Argentina. 8n the years after the annexation of Puerto Rico to the United States in 1898 and the prohibition on Canarian immigration, most Canarian emigrants went to Cuba, with certain flows to other countries (especially Argentina and Uruguay). Most Canarian emigrants went to Cuba and Venezuela in 1936-1948 and to Venezuela alone after 1948. Since the early 1980s, with the improvement of the Canary Islands' economy (and Spain's in general, until the economic crisis of 2008), Canarian emigration has diminished.

== Reasons for emigration ==
After a century and a half of growth, the economy of the Canary Islands was in crisis. The diminished output of vidueño canario (an internationally traded white table wine) after the 1640 emancipation from Spanish rule of Portugal, whose colonies were its preferred market, put thousands of Canarians out of work, causing many of them to immigrate to the Americas with their families. There was discussion in governmental circles of the islands being overpopulated, and the Spanish crown decided to institute the Tributo de Sangre (tribute of blood). For every hundred tons of cargo that a Spanish colony in the Americas sent to Spain, five Canarian families would be sent there. The number of families actually sent, however, usually exceeded ten.

The occupation of Jamaica by the English and of the western half of Santo Domingo and the Guianas by the French made the Spanish Crown consider wanting to avoid the occupation of part of Venezuela and the Greater Antilles. Commerce in cochineal dye expanded in the Canary Islands during the 19th century well into the 1880s, when trade in this product plummeted, which, together with the coffee boom and the war crisis in Cuba, depressed the economy. It also spurred Canarian immigration to the Americas. After 1893, Canarians continued to immigrate to Venezuela to escape Spanish military service.

During the Ten Years' War (1868–1878) in Cuba, Cuban separatists made a distinction between Canary Islander immigrants and those from peninsular Spain, leading them to promote Canarian immigration to Cuba. The usual form of administration to manage the emigration from the islands prevailed, with corruption and fraud governing the actions of the Canarian ruling classes. In the 20th century poverty, the Spanish Civil War, and the actions of Francoist Spain also drove Canarian immigration to the Americas.

For the reasons already mentioned, there were specific problems on some islands that also boosted Canarian emigration. In Lanzarote, from the 16th to the 20th century, the people experienced terrible drought (1626–1632), epidemics, house and tithe taxes, invasions of locusts, and several volcanic eruptions in 1730, affecting over half the population, causing many of them to migrate, pirate attacks (Lanzarote suffered more pirate invasions than the other islands) and harsh weather conditions. Consequently, many people on Lanzarote migrated to other Canary Islands including (Tenerife, Gran Canaria and Fuerteventura) as well as to the Americas, including Uruguay, Argentina, Cuba, Puerto Rico, Venezuela and the southern United States.

== United States ==
During the 18th century, the Spanish crown sent several groups of Canary Islanders to their colonies in New Spain. Spain's goal was to colonize certain regions with Spanish settlers, and between 1731 and 1783, several Canarian communities were established in what is now the Southern United States. In 1731, 16 Canarian families arrived in San Antonio, Spanish Texas. Between 1757 and 1759, 154 families were sent to Spanish Florida.

Between 1778 and 1783 another 2,100 Canarians arrived in Spanish Louisiana and founded the four communities of Galveztown, Valenzuela, Barataria, and San Bernardo. Of those settlements, Valenzuela and San Bernardo were the most successful as the other two were plagued with both disease and flooding. The large migration of Acadian refugees to Bayou Lafourche led to the rapid gallicization of the Valenzuela community while the community of San Bernardo (Saint Bernard) was able to preserve much of its unique culture and language into the 21st century.

Many Isleños fought in the American Revolutionary War and the Battle of the Alamo. After the incorporation of Louisiana and Texas into the United States, they fought in the Civil War and both World Wars. The Isleños have been able to preserve some features of their culture except in Florida, where they had made improvements in its agriculture, but most of the Canarian settlers immigrated to Cuba when Florida was ceded to Great Britain in 1763 and still more left when, after being recovered by Spain, Florida was ceded to the United States in 1819. The dialect of Spanish spoken in the Canary Islands during the 18th century was still spoken by older Isleños until the 1950s in San Antonio but is still spoken in St. Bernard Parish.

== Hispanic Antilles ==
Louisiana's Isleños have shared some aspects of Canarian culture for over 200 years with the Cuban, Puerto Rican and Dominican peoples in those Caribbean countries influenced by earlier waves of settlers from the Canary Islands, who first arrived in the Americas in the late 16th century.

=== Cuba ===
Of the Latin American countries, Cuba was most affected by the immigration of Canary Islanders, and their presence influenced the development of the Cuban dialect and accent. Many words in traditional Cuban Spanish can be traced to the dialect spoken in the Canary Islands. Cuban Spanish is very close to Canarian Spanish, as Canarians have been immigrating to Cuba since the 16th century, especially during the 19th and (early) 20th centuries.

Through cross-immigration by Canarians and Cubans, many Canarian customs have become Cuban traditions and vice versa. Cuban music has been integrated into Canarian culture as well, including mambo, son, and punto Cubano. Cuban immigration to the Canary Islands has introduced, for example, the dish "moros y cristianos" (or simply "moros"), to the cuisine of the Canary Islands; especially on the island of La Palma. Canary Islanders were the driving force in the cigar industry in Cuba, where they were called "Vegueros." Many of the big cigar factories in Cuba were owned by Canary Islanders. After the Castro revolution, many Cubans and returning Canarians settled in the Canary Islands, among them cigar factory owners such as the Garcias. Through them the cigar industry made its way to the Canary Islands from Cuba, and it is now well-established there. The island of La Palma has had the most Cuban influence out of the seven islands, and its accent is the closest of the island accents to the Cuban accent.

Many of the typical Cuban variations of standard Spanish vocabulary derive from the Canarian lexicon. For example, the word "guagua" (bus) differs from the standard Spanish autobús; the former originated in the Canaries and is an onomatopoeic word imitative of the sound of a Klaxon horn (wah-wah). The term of endearment socio is from the Canary Islands. An example of Canarian usage for a Spanish word is the verb fajarse (to fight). In standard Spanish the verb would be pelearse, while fajar exists as a non-reflexive verb related to the hemming of a skirt. The Cuban dialect of Spanish shows a substantial influence of the Spanish spoken in the Canary Islands.

Many names for food items come from the Canary Islands as well. The Cuban sauce mojo is based on the mojos of the Canary Islands, where the sauce was invented. Canarian ropa vieja was introduced to Cuba through Canarian immigration. Gofio is another Canarian food known to Cubans, along with many others.

=== Puerto Rico ===
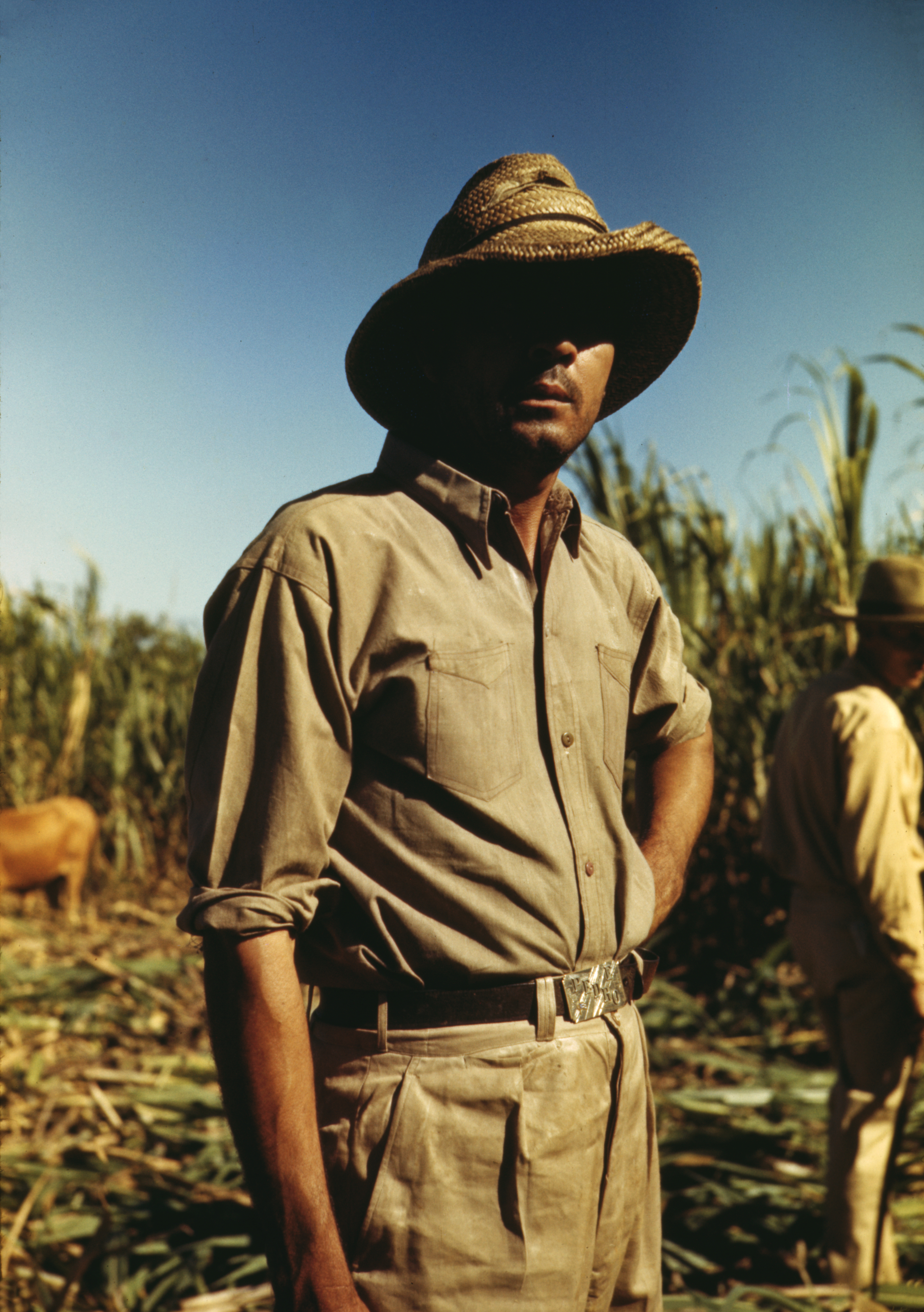
Most Puerto Rican Jíbaros were of Canarian stock.

Between 1678 and 1764 the Spanish policy of tributo de sangre stated that for every ton of cargo shipped from the Spanish colonies in the Americas to Spain, five Canarian families were sent to populate the colonies. The number of families sent to the Americas, however, often became ten. The first wave of Canarian emigration seems to have occurred in 1695 when Juan Fernández Franco de Medina, the new Governor of Puerto Rico, arrived with 20 Canarian families. This was followed by others in 1714, 1720, 1731, and 1797. Between 1720 and 1730, some 176 Canarian families, totaling 882 persons, immigrated to Puerto Rico, more than half of them married couples and their children, and the rest eventually found partners in Puerto Rico.

The tributo de sangre ended in 1764, but poverty and overpopulation in the Canary Islands still caused many Canarians to immigrate to Puerto Rico and other parts of Latin America. After the Spanish American colonies won their independence (1811–1825), most Canarian immigrants went to Cuba and Puerto Rico, the only remaining Spanish possessions in the Americas, where their labor was exploited to replace that of slaves, who had been liberated with the abolishment of slavery. Following the Spanish–American War of 1898, Canarian immigration to the Americas continued. Successive waves of Canary Island immigration came to Puerto Rico, and entire villages were formed of relocated islanders.

Between 1891 and 1895, Canary immigration to Puerto Rico was officially over 600 immigrants; if unrecorded or concealed immigration were taken into account, the number would be much larger. Canarian immigration to Puerto Rico in the 19th century is estimated at 2,733 people, mostly peasants desiring to farm their own land, who tended to settle in Puerto Rico in families or groups of families related to each other.

Whole towns and villages in Puerto Rico were founded by Canarian immigrants, and their lasting influence of Canarian culture can still be heard in the Puerto Rican accent and seen in the cuatro, a small guitar with origins in the Canary Islands. The Canarian Islands have contributed more to the Puerto Rican population than any other Spanish region except Andalusia, and Canary Islanders, along with Andalusians, were the principal Spanish expatriate community there by the 19th century.

The Isleños contributed substantially to the development of agriculture, as well as the provincial rural character of Puerto Rican society, preserving their ancestral customs, traditions, folk arts, dialect and festivals that remain features of Puerto Rican culture. They tended to settle in areas where other Isleños were already living, preferring certain rural districts and towns like Camuy, Hatillo and Barceloneta. They concentrated also in San Juan, Ponce, Lares, San Sebastián, Lajas, Mayagüez and Manatí. Many settled in small villages where they intermarried with other Puerto Ricans and with the Jíbaro peasants.

Most of the Isleños arrived on the island married, often with many children, which helped to preserve their customs, traditions, religions, and accent. A group of geneticists from Puerto Rican universities conducted a study of mitochondrial DNA, which is passed through the mother, and found that the present population of Puerto Rico has in its genome a substantial component of genes from Guanches, the Canarian aborigines, especially those from the island of Tenerife. In some areas of the island, this Guanche component appears in over 50% of the sampled population, and in the western part, it appears in over 80%. Even today, there are people in these towns who can relate stories from their Canary Island great-grandparents that they remember when they were children.

=== Dominican Republic ===
In 1501, Nicolás de Ovando left the Canary Islands with a group of Canarians, some of them from Lanzarote, and sailed to Hispaniola island. There was also an influx of Canarian settlers, who arrived on the colony of Santo Domingo (now Dominican Republic) in the second half of the 16th century. Santo Domingo, in the mid-17th century, still had a very small population and suffered economic hardship. The Spanish authorities believed that the French, who had occupied the western part of the island (now Haiti), might also try to take the eastern half of the island, now the Dominican Republic. They asked the Spanish crown to send Canarian families to stop French expansion.

By the royal decree of May 6, 1663, under the policy of the tributo de sangre, 800 Canarian families were sent to the island. There were 97 Canarian families who arrived in 1684 and founded San Carlos de Tenerife (in 1911, it became a neighborhood of the city of Santo Domingo). The Spanish authorities there concentrated resources on agriculture and livestock, and incorporated a municipality and a church dedicated to the city's patroness, Nuestra Señora de la Candelaria (Our Lady of Candelaria). The population increased with the arrival of 39 families in 1700 and another 49 in 1709. Canarian families who arrived that year had to bribe the governor to be permitted to remain there.

In the first decades of the 18th century, another group of Canarians immigrated to Santiago de los Caballeros, where they formed a militia made up exclusively of Canarians, and another in Frontera, where the group founded Banica and Hincha in 1691 and 1702, respectively. In the latter two settlements the raising of livestock prospered thanks to the growing trade with Haiti. The lack of financial resources and the War of the Spanish Succession led to a decrease in Canarian immigration to the area. Afterwards, Canarian immigration increase significantly but came to a standstill again between 1742 and 1749 as a result of the war with England. The Canarians settled mainly on the border with Haiti to prevent French territorial expansion of the country, founding San Rafael de Angostura, San Miguel de la Atalaya, the Las Caobas and Dajabón, as well as ports in strategic locations in Monte Cristi Province with the arrival of 46 families between 1735 and 1736, Puerto Plata (1736), Samana (1756) and Sabana de la Mar (1760). The Canarians also founded San Carlos de Tenerife, Baní, Neiba, San Juan de la Maguana and Jánico.

After 1764, the Canarians were sent primarily to the Cibao. The thriving border towns there were abandoned in 1794, when the area become part of Haiti during the Haitian domination (1822–1844). Isleños on the now Haitian side of the border moved to the interior of the island, and some of them, especially of those from Cibao, moved to Cuba, Puerto Rico and Venezuela. The Isleños were, for a time, the fastest-growing ethnic group in the Dominican Republic. In the 19th and 20th centuries, the flow of Canarians immigrating to the country slowed to a trickle.

Pedro Santana, the first president of the Dominican Republic, rented several Venezuelan ships during the mid-19th century period of border disputes with Haiti to carry Isleños to the Dominican Republic, but most of the 2,000 who emigrated returned to Venezuela in 1862, when José Antonio Páez came to power. Many of the Canarians who settled in the Dominican Republic (including Jose Trujillo Monagas, originally from Gran Canaria and the grandfather of the later dictator Rafael Leónidas Trujillo), settled in the capital and in rural areas, especially in the east. During the first half of the 20th century, some groups of Canarians immigrated to the Dominican Republic, many of them Republican exiles who came during and after the Spanish Civil War (1936–1939). 300 Canarians arrived in 1955, when Trujillo encouraged Spanish immigration to his country to raise the white population, but most of them left and went to Venezuela because of the harsh conditions. Some of them remained in Constanza and in El Cibao. Isleños contributed to the development of agriculture in the Dominican Republic with their raising of crops like coffee, cocoa and tobacco.

== Venezuela ==
During colonial times and until the end of the Second World War, most European immigrants in Venezuela were Canary Islanders. Their cultural impact was significant, influencing both the development of Castilian Spanish in the country as well as its cuisine and customs. Venezuela has perhaps the largest population of Canarian immigrants, and it is commonly said in the Canary Islands that "Venezuela is the eighth island of the Canary Islands." In the 16th century, the German Jorge de la Espira in the Canary Islands recruited 200 men to colonize Venezuela, as did Diego Hernández de Serpa, governor of New Andalusia Province, who sent another 200 soldiers and 400 slaves from Gran Canaria to Venezuela, where some of these Canarians were among the founders of Cumaná. Diego de Ordaz, governor of Paria, took about 350 persons, and his successor, Jerome of Ortal, about 80 people, from Tenerife, whether they were native Canarians or just people settled in the islands. In 1681, 54 families from Tenerife were transported to the port of Cumaná, but this area was so unsafe that a few of them settled in villages already founded or went to the Llanos. The next year, another group of 31 families arrived from Tenerife as well.

25 Canarian families were transported to Guyana in 1717 to found a village, and they then migrated to the Llanos of Venezuela. In 1697, Maracaibo was founded with 40 Canarian families, which was followed in 1700 by another 29 in the town of Los Marqueses. Maracaibo received 25 Canarian families between 1732 and 1738, while in 1764 another 14 families arrived, to which were added another 300 families transported to Venezuela. This Canarian migration to Venezuela in the 18th century was one of two waves of migration from the Canary Islands to the Venezuelan region, the second of which occurred in the mid-early 19th century. Venezuela experienced significant economic and political change between these centuries, and Canarians played key roles during the turbulent period of revolts and independence movements that resulted in these changes, roles largely inspired by the social, economic, and political conditions faced by the first wave of Canarian immigrants to the region.

Beginning in the 1680s and continuing into the 18th century, Canarians arrived in Venezuela in large numbers. Facing the reality that the Canary Islands had neither the land nor the economic conditions to support an ever-growing population, these migrants arrived in Venezuela in search of opportunity, most importantly in terms of land for agricultural production. However, Canarians faced social conditions that impeded their ability to develop strong economic footholds in the region. Firstly, the Caracas Company, a trading company established by the Spanish crown to incorporate the economy of Venezuela into that of the greater Spanish empire in the Americas, held a monopoly over trade and dictated the cost of produced and imported goods. Secondly, the landed elites of Venezuela had a firm grip on the economy and agricultural production in the northern areas of the country that included the economic and political center of Caracas as well as the land most productive for cacao production, a staple of the regional economy. Canarians looking for land were forced further inland to the Llanos, where the land was often less productive and demanded more work. Canarian landowners and agricultural producers therefore saw themselves as largely insignificant in the export economy. Those that decided against searching for land took jobs as laborers on cacao estates or became menial workers such as shopkeepers or transporters of goods, while others became involved in the business of contraband. Canarians involved in illicit trade did achieve some success towards the end of the 18th century, especially as the Canarian communities in the Llanos developed economically and looked for trading options for their goods outside of the monopoly of the Caracas Company. However, these contrabandists faced increasing challenges to their operations as the Spanish crown began appointing a greater number of peninsulares—peninsular Spaniards mostly from the Basque region—to a wide range of official positions, including those that held jurisdiction over the investigation of contrabandists, indicating a crackdown on a key industry for many Canarians. Regardless of their profession, Canarians had little economic or political power and were impacted by the monopolistic practices of the peninsular-operated Caracas Company and the economic and social influences of the landed elite, conditions that would be catalysts for Canarian involvement in revolts and rebellions.

The rigid, caste-like social structure in Venezuela dictated the experience of Canarians in the region in the 17th and 18th centuries. Although separate from colored people such as mulattos, slaves, and Indians due to their race, Canarians were still seen as inferior by the Venezuelan-born Creole elites, whose social and racial prejudices often led them to include the Canarians in the lowest social strata that included these people of color. Among whites, Canarians were seen as inferior to both the peninsular Spanish and the Creoles due to their status as immigrants and their relative poverty. This classism was omnipresent in Venezuelan life, determining social interactions as well as economic prospects. Laws prohibited intermarriage between Canarians and Spaniards. Occupations in which Canarians were well-represented were usually those that Creoles rejected as ‘unworthy’ of people of their status, and there was little to no opportunity for them to gain social status. Although Canarians could legally hold political, merchant, military and bureaucratic positions, unlike people of color, they were often not as openly accepted or respected under these positions.

Venezuela descended into a period of political and social instability from 1750 to the early 1800s as tensions flared between the Spanish and their subjects in Venezuela and independence movements gained steam. Initially, Canarians held no strong allegiances to either the independence or royalist movements, and instead had reasons for wanting either of the possible outcomes. These outcomes both served them in some way; independence for Venezuela meant an end to the stranglehold the Caracas Company held over regional trade, and royalist victory meant an opportunity to change the social order which had often been oppressive to anybody not a peninsular Spaniard or Creole elite. However, it was Canarian discontent with the Caracas Company that drove their initial participation in these movements. A Canarian-led protest in 1749 against the Company, which was widely supported among non-Spanish members of the Venezuelan population, ended with brutal repercussions for participants of lower social classes but a relatively lighter punishment for Creole elites, as well as changes to the Caracas Company which gave the Creoles, but not the Canarians, the opportunity to own shares of the company. A rallying cry for Canarians during this protest was “Long live the King and death to the Vizcayans,” referring to the peninsulares who held positions of power in government and the Caracas Company. The Canarians were not looking to rid themselves of the Spanish crown, but to shake themselves of the power of the Caracas Company and peninsulares who threatened the contraband economy.

Despite their support for the King, many Canarians initially supported the independence movement of the First Republic in 1810, realizing the potential for change in a new nation. This change did not materialize, and Canarians switched allegiance to the royalist cause in the years that followed the establishment of the First Republic. The Canarians, much like other groups in Venezuelan society, were opportunists when choosing when and to whom to show their support. They were looking for a fairer economy without the monopolistic presence of the Caracas Company, but also hoping that a new republic would be formed under different social circumstances. Creoles had no intentions of relinquishing their social superiority or economic and political power, and Canarians reacted accordingly. Canarian support for the Spanish crown was documented, and they likely believed their support would be rewarded with economic opportunity and social capital by switching to the royalist cause. Upon the success of the counterrevolution of 1812, Canarians were rewarded for their loyalty with positions of power. Canarians who ascended to such positions were often underqualified for their posts, and many were ruthless in denouncing and persecuting former employers and other Creoles. Many accounts, both written at the time of the counter-revolution or in later periods by historians, paint Canarians as ignorant, vulgar, and hated by the rest of the population, and blame that ignorance as the rationale behind the decision-making of Isleños during the counter-revolution. Other accounts, however, don’t see the ignorance as a factor in decision-making, instead arguing that Isleños identified and sided with the movement they believed would be most sympathetic to their cause and their goals. Regardless, their support for the counter-revolution would cement their position as royalists in the Second Republic and royalist caudillo movements that would follow in the early 19th century.

Many of those who fought in the Venezuelan War of Independence in the first half of the 19th century were Canarians or descendants of Canarians. For example, Simón Bolívar had Canarian ancestors on his mother's side. There were many other notable Venezuelan leaders who were of Canarian descent, such as the precursor of independence Francisco de Miranda, the philosopher Andrés Bello and the physician José Gregorio Hernández, as well as José Antonio Páez, José María Vargas, Carlos Soublette, José Tadeo Monagas, Antonio Guzmán Blanco, Rómulo Betancourt and Rafael Caldera. More than 9,000 Canarians immigrated to Venezuela between 1841 and 1844, and in 1875, more than 5,000 Canarians arrived.

Since 1936, most Canarian immigrants have gone either to Cuba or to Venezuela (some of those who immigrated to Venezuela came from Cuba) because they encouraged immigration, especially of Spanish citizens, and since 1948, most have immigrated to Venezuela, a massive immigration that did not end until the early 1980s, but there was a significant decrease in the 1970s, with the beginning of Canarian immigration to other European countries. Canarians and their descendants are now scattered throughout Venezuela.

== Uruguay ==
The first Canarians to immigrate to Uruguay were settled in Montevideo to populate the region, arriving in two different groups. The first group was established in the city on November 19, 1726, and 25 Canarian families came to Montevideo. They organized quickly to survive in that area. The first civilian authorities in Montevideo were Canarian, and they were the first to give Spanish names to roads and geographic features. The second group, with 30 Canarian families, arrived in the city on March 27, 1729. Others places in Uruguay where Canary Islanders settled were Colonia, San José, Maldonado, Canelones and Soriano.

In 1808, the Canarian merchant Francisco Aguilar y Leal sent an expedition of 200 people from the eastern islands of the Canaries to Montevideo. Between 1835 and 1845 about 8,200 Canarians, more than half of Lanzarote's population, immigrated to Uruguay, and groups of them continued to come sporadically until about 1900. During the 19th century, more than 10,000 Canarians settled in Uruguay, the majority from the eastern islands; however, only 5700 or so of them remained permanently in Uruguay. A few groups of Canary Islanders continued to arrive through the early 20th century, still coming mainly from the eastern islands, but specific figures are not available. Canarians and Canarian descendants are scattered throughout Uruguay. Uruguay ranks fifth after Venezuela, Cuba, Puerto Rico and the Dominican Republic in the number of people of Canarian descent among its population.

== Canary Islanders in other places in the Americas ==
=== Canarians in Mexico and Central America ===
Descendants of Canary Islanders are a small community in Mexico, but their presence is notable especially in the business world and in the tourism industry. A few Canarian families migrated to Mexico in the 17th century (as in the case of the Azuaje families). In the 18th century, when the Spanish crown encouraged Canarian immigration to the Americas through the Tributo de sangre (Blood Tribute), many of them settled in Yucatán, where by the 18th century they controlled the trade network that distributed goods throughout the peninsula; their descendants are still counted among the most influential families of direct Spanish descent in Mexico. During the 20th century, another group of Canarians settled in Mexico in the early 1930s, and as with Galician and other Spanish immigrants of the time, there were high rates of illiteracy and impoverishment among them, but they adapted relatively quickly. While the Spanish Civil War was still being fought in Spain, the prominent Canarian intellectual Agustin Millares Carlo from Las Palmas became an expatriate in Mexico in 1938. University professor Jorge Hernández Millares, who did important work in the subject of geography, went into exile in Mexico after the war.

Two Spanish expeditions to Panama were led by Canarians. The first was organized by Pedrarias Dávila, who recruited fifty good swimmers from Gomera to dive for pearls in 1514. The men, however, were dispersed when they came ashore. Another expedition was led in 1519 by López de Sosa, who was appointed by the Spanish government to replace Dávila and recruited 200 of his neighbors on Gran Canaria to participate in the conquest of Central America.

In 1534, Bartolomé García Muxica, founder of Nombre de Dios, Panama, brought a group of Canary Islanders to the country. These were among the few Canarians who immigrated to Panama in that century.

In 1787, 306 Canarians arrived on the Mosquito Coast of Honduras. The plan for populating the area failed, however, because of the hostility they encountered from the Zambos and the Miskito Indians, as well as the general unhealthiness of the area. They were able to successfully establish themselves near the Honduran port of Trujillo, where they could farm the surrounding lands, and in the highlands where they founded the town of Macuelizo in 1788.

In 1884, over 8,000 Canarians immigrated to a small town in Costa Rica when the country invited Canarian immigration to populate the uninhabited town (some Canarians had already settled in Costa Rica, beginning in the 16th century). A Canarian from Lanzarote island, Jose Martinez, was among the first Spanish settlers to arrive in Costa Rica in the 16th century.

=== Canary Islanders in other Caribbean and South American countries ===
The number of Canary islanders who immigrated to Argentina before the 19th century was very low, although three companies of soldiers from Tenerife who were with Pedro de Mendoza when he founded Buenos Aires in 1535 decided to stay, they intermarried with natives and/or other Spanish settlers. Several ships came to Buenos Aires with immigrant Canarians in 1830; a group of them settled in the interior and another group settled in the capital (the descendants of those families have spread gradually throughout the country). Although the number of Canarians who immigrated to Argentina during the 19th century was not comparable to the number of those who immigrated to Cuba, Puerto Rico, Venezuela and Uruguay, in some years there were relatively large numbers of Canarian immigrants; for example, between 1878 and 1888, 3,033 Canarians immigrated. The immigration rate to Argentina was relatively high among the islanders in the 20th century, but did not reach the volume of those who went to Cuba and Venezuela. Even so, in the 1930s, the Canarian government put the number of Canarians and their descendants in that country at about 80,000 people. In 1984 there were 1,038 Canarians in Buenos Aires. They formed several organizations to preserve their ethnic heritage and provide mutual aid. Several Canarian families from Buenos Aires settled in Paraguay, where they founded the town of Candelaria.

In Colombia, in 1536, Pedro Fernández de Lugo led an expedition of 1,500 people, 400 of whom were Canarians from all the different islands that make up the archipelago, for the conquest of the area around what became Santa Marta. This contingent pacified the warring tribes on the coast and penetrated into the interior, founding several cities, two of which, Las Palmas and Tenerife, still exist. In addition, Pedro de Heredia led 100 men from the Canary Islands to Cartagena de Indias.

In the 16th century, many people who immigrated to the Americas from there were, in fact, Spaniards from the mainland of Europe or foreigners, making it difficult to know how many of the immigrants were actually Canarians. There are records also of some Canarians and Canarian families, at least some of them known to be from Lanzarote, who settled in Cartagena de Indias and Cáceres, Antioquia, in the second half of the 16th century. Others emigrated in 1678 by the terms of the Tributo de Sangre to Santa Marta.

In 1903, a fleet arrived in Budi Lake, Chile, with 88 Canarian families—400 persons—that currently have more than 1,000 descendants. They responded to the government's call to populate this region and signed contracts for the benefit of a private company. Some were arrested while trying to escape their servitude, and the indigenous Mapuche people took pity on the plight of these Canarians who were established on their former lands. The Indians welcomed them and joined their demonstrations in the so-called "revolt of the Canarians", and many Canarians intermarried with Mapuches.

Little is known about any Canary immigration to Brazil. It is known, however, that since the 16th century, the Canary Islands were a transit point for European vessels bound for the Americas (many of them to Brazil), and it is likely that some of them were carrying Canarians to the Portuguese colony. Due to the difficult circumstances of travel, several expeditions that had left Lanzarote for Uruguay were forced to end their passage in other places, such as Rio de Janeiro and Santa Catarina island. By 1812, a small group of Canarians (all of them from Lanzarote) lived on Santa Catarina island, in the south of Brazil. A study by W.F. Piazza notes that parish records from 1814 to 1818 show 20 families from Lanzarote living there. Rixo Alvarez speaks of the expeditions of Polycarp Medinilla, a Portuguese based in Lanzarote, and Agustín González Brito, from Arrecife. The settlers from Lanzarote were forced to disembark in Rio de Janeiro. Only an estimated 50 Canary Islanders immigrated to Brazil in this century. During the last years of the 19th century, some propaganda leaflets were printed to promote the immigration to Brazil of Canarians to work as laborers. How effective they were is unknown. There were other publications distributed in the Canary Islands that opposed the emigration movement, and the Canarian press depicted a very negative view of the quality of life for migrants in Brazil. Some ships transporting Canary Islander immigrants to Venezuela during the early 20th century were blown off course and landed in Brazil, the French Antilles, Guayana or Trinidad Island where they were permanently settled, as well as others who immigrated directly to Brazil from the Canary Islands. A few Canarians on vessels headed to Venezuela were shipwrecked on the Brazilian coast in the 1960s.

Due to proximity of Curaçao, Aruba, and Bonaire to South America and the establishment of economic ties between the Netherlands (the ruler of Curaçao) and Viceroyalty of New Granada (which includes present-day countries of Colombia and Venezuela), Canarian settlers from nearby Venezuela lived on the islands; children from affluent Canarian Venezuelan families were educated on the islands. In the 19th century, Curaçaoans such as Manuel Piar and Luis Brión were prominently engaged in the wars of independence of Venezuela and Colombia. Political refugees from the mainland (such as Simon Bolivar) regrouped in Curaçao. While many Canarians returned to Venezuela after its independence, many of them remained in Curaçao, Aruba, and Bonaire.

== See also ==
- Canarian Americans
- Canarian people
- Canarian Spanish
- Criollo people
- History of San Antonio, Texas
- Isleño (Louisiana)
- Isleño Spanish
- Isleños Fiesta
- Spanish language in the United States
- Tejano
