= Gala Gonzalez =

Spanish model and fashion blogger

Gala González
- Born: March 16, 1986 (age 40); A Coruña, Galicia, Spain
- Education: University of the Arts London
- Occupations: Fashion designer; blogger; disc jockey
- Years active: 2007–present
- Relatives: Adolfo Domínguez (uncle)

Gala González (born March 16, 1986) is a Spanish model, socialite, blogger, fashion designer and DJ. She is the first Spanish fashion blogger, and is the niece of Spanish designer Adolfo Domínguez. González, with her niece, produces environmentally friendly clothing.

== Early life ==
González was born in A Coruña, Galicia, Spain. Her family is involved in fashion. González studied at University of the Arts London where she graduated with a BA in fashion.

== Career ==
She began blogging in 2007 following the success of her fotolog.

González has worked as the creative director of Línea U by Adolfo Domínguez since 2007. During September 2009, González released her own first collection Music Collection for the Spanish label Adolfo Dominguez. In June 2010, she was cast for Loewe's campaign.

== Personal life ==
She currently lives in Madrid.
