= Juan Verde =

Spanish business and social entrepreneur

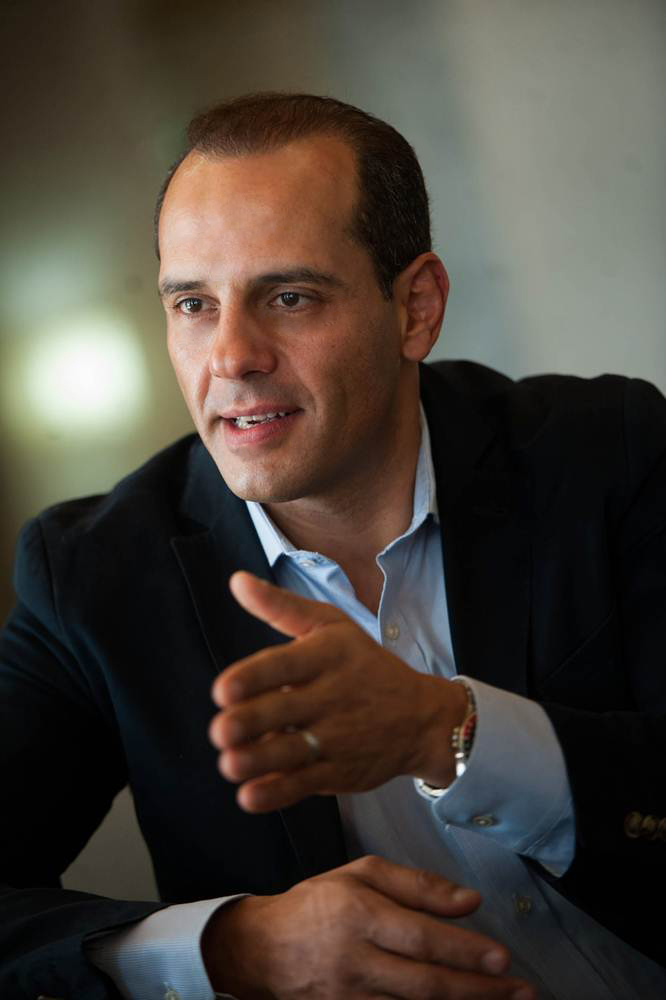

Deputy Assistant Secretary of Commerce for Europe and Eurasia
- In office 2009–2011
- Preceded by: Eric Stewart
- Succeeded by: Matthew Murray

Personal details
- Born: July 7, 1971 (age 55) Telde, Gran Canaria, Spain
- Party: Democratic
- Spouse: Tiziana Domínguez (m. 2011; div. 2018)
- Education: Boston University (B.A.); Harvard University (M.A.)
- Occupation: Businessman

Juan Verde Suárez (born July 7, 1971) is a Spanish business and social entrepreneur who assisted the Joe Biden 2020 presidential campaign, as well as earlier campaigns of prominent Democrats such as President Barack Obama, Secretary of State Hillary Clinton, President Bill Clinton, Vice President Al Gore, Senator John Kerry, and Senator Ted Kennedy. He was a member of the President's Export Council, an advisory body to the White House on international trade and U.S. competitiveness in international markets, under President Biden.

Verde developed and directed a strategy designed to mobilize millions of American citizens residing outside of the United States for the Obama campaign in 2008 and 2012, an effort he revived on behalf of the Biden campaign in 2020. He previously served as International Co-chair for the reelection campaign of President Barack Obama in 2012. He advised both candidates on strategies for capturing the Hispanic vote as well as international trade and sustainability-related issues.

In addition to his role as a political strategist, Juan Verde is a member of the board of directors and Vice Chairman of Volcan Compañía Minera, a leading mining company in Latin America. Verde is founder and President of the U.S. consultancy firm Alamo Solutions, which advises governments and corporations on market expansion, strategy, and sustainability, and The Advanced Leadership Foundation, a U.S.-based 501(c)3 focused on training next-generation global leaders. Verde formerly served on the Board of Advisors of the American Sustainable Business Council.

== Early years and education ==
Verde was born in Telde, Gran Canaria (Canary Islands, Spain) on July 7, 1971. He received a Bachelor of Arts in Political Science and International Relations from Boston University and a master's degree in Public Administration from the Harvard Kennedy School. He has completed post-graduate business studies at Georgetown University and Tufts University. Verde is a former Congressional Hispanic Caucus Institute fellow.

== Policy and government ==
Verde's career in government began as a Business and Legislative Aide in the Boston Mayor's Office and the Boston City Council, which later led to a position as a political and economic advisor for the Boston Mayor Ray Flynn. He then worked for the U.S. Department of Commerce during the Clinton Administration, first in the Office of Latin America as an analyst and subsequently in the Minority Business Development Agency as an international trade coordinator.

Verde joined the Corporate Executive Board, now owned by Gartner, in 1998. He served as a Director for Latin America and the Iberian Peninsula. He founded several business-centered policy initiatives, including the PASS Group (2002), the Canary Islands chapter and the Gibraltar chapter of the American Chamber of Commerce Spain (2006 and 2014, respectively), Think Plus Madrid (2004), and The Climate Reality Project Spain (2006), and worked as a consultant to business and political leaders in the United States, Europe, and Latin America.

In 2009, Verde returned to U.S. government service via an appointment by President Barack Obama as Deputy Assistant Secretary for Europe and Eurasia at the United States Department of Commerce, where he served until 2011. While holding this position, he led the department's efforts to resolve issues related to trade policy and access to markets faced by United States companies. As Deputy Assistant Secretary, Verde was also responsible for developing policies and programs to foster economic and trade relations within the region. He took part in the U.S. government delegation headed by Department of State Principal Deputy Assistant Secretary for South and Central Asian Affairs Geoffrey R. Pyatt in Ashgabat, Turkmenistan on May 17, 2011. The exhibition had over fifty American companies with business interests in Turkmenistan, showcasing their goods and services to Turkmenistan government officials.

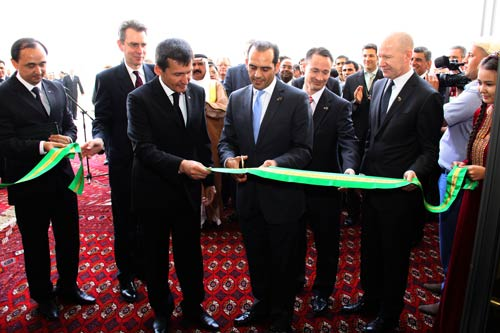
Business Expo in Turkmenistan - May 2011

In October 2011, Verde joined the reelection campaign of President Barack Obama as International Co-chair. in the past, Verde also joined the presidential campaign of Vice President Joe Biden as one of the campaign's Latino Outreach leaders.

=== Business roles ===
Verde has served on a number of corporate, government, and university advisory boards, including the Government of Lithuania's International Advisory Committee, the Alumni Board of Directors at Harvard University's Kennedy School of Government, and the boards of directors of corporations such as Abengoa Bioenergy S.A., a global biotech ethanol company; Santander Investments, N.A., a U.S. subsidiary of the Spanish financial institution Grupo Santander; and Andina Energy Corp., a global diversified energy corporation.

In 2017, he founded Alamo Solutions LLC, an international consultancy focused on innovation and sustainable business.

=== Advocacy ===
Verde advocates for climate change action in the form of a transition to a "green economy." He attributes his interest in climate change and sustainable business activism to his work with Vice President Al Gore during the latter's presidential campaign in 2000.

Verde also works to promote the business and policy interests of the Latino community in the United States. He served on the board of the Latino Victory Project in 2020 to seek financial support for the Biden campaign from the Latino community. Before that, he also served from 2016 to 2019 on the board of directors of the Latino Corporate Directors Association (LCDA), an organization seeking to improve the representation of Latino executives on corporate boards. He had previously served as a member of the Hispanic Leadership Council for the 2016 Hillary Clinton presidential campaign and the 2008 Barack Obama presidential campaign.

== Personal life ==
Verde was married to Tiziana Domínguez from 2011 to 2018. They have two children together.

== See also ==
- Green economy
