= Juan Moya =

Mexican army officer (1806–1874)

- Born: 1806; Presidio La Bahia (Goliad), Texas
- Died: 1874 (aged 67–68); Goliad, Texas
- Occupations: landowner and Mexican army's captain

Juan Moya y Delgado (1806–1874) was a Tejano landowner and Mexican army captain who fought in the Texas Revolution. Moya and two of his sons were accused of murder and lynched.

== Biography ==
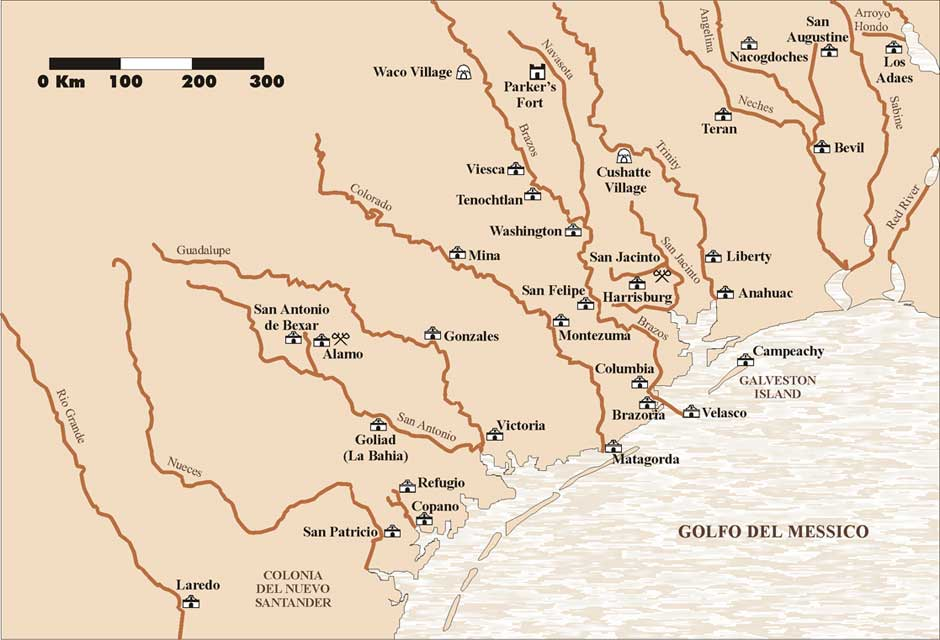
Map of Spanish Texas, that show the places in which Moya (and his ancestors) lived and owned land.

Juan Moya was born around 1806 in the Presidio La Bahia (Goliad), Texas. His father was José Miguel Delgado and his two brothers are Pedro and Nepomuceno. His family descended from the first Spanish settlers who were from the Canary Islands and settled in San Antonio de Béjar in 1731.

In 1795, Moya's father obtained land from the government in San Patricio County and lived on Delgado's Ranch called Rancho San Miguel de Buena Virtud (later renamed to Rancho de Buena Vista). On November 26, 1831, José Miguel Delgado and his three sons obtained lands from the McMullen-McGloin Colony. Juan and his family stayed on the Rancho de Buena Vista. At this time, he was married to María Antonia Martinez and had a one-year-old son named Agustín.

On November 30, 1834, Moya got more land by the Power and Heweston Colony in Bee County. In Goliad Juan Delgado (likely to be the same person as Juan Moya) was granted land as well. He and his family primarily stayed at their ranch in Bee County (which was known at the time as Rancho Moya - Spanish for: Moya Ranch). It was later renamed as the John Quincy Rancho after it was acquired by J.M. O'Brien.

Moya joined the Mexican Army during the Texas Revolution between 1835 and 1836 and served as captain in the Mexican Centralist Army. His ranch, Moya Rancho, was used both by the General Martin Perfecto de Cos (who become it in his headquarter) and by General Vicente Filisola (who used it as his campside, following his withdrawal to Mexico).

Ten years later, around 1846, Juan Moya, his wife and seven children decided to settle in Victoria County. He would occasionally return to Bee and Goliad during land title disputes arising from the Texas Revolution.

Moya and two of his sons Antonio and Marcelo were accused of murdering the Swift family who were nearby neighbors. They were imprisoned. On June 8, 1874, they were lynched by a group of people who believed them to be guilty of the crime. The Moya family cemetery is near Berclair, Goliad County, on the land of Juan Delgado.

== After his death ==
Following his death, Moya's Rancho was divided into two parcels. One was received by Lea Pryor and the other half received by the Moya family. However, the family lost the most of their land in court battles. Moya's descendants still live in Goliad and in all the neighboring counties. In 1974 the family founded the Moya Association of Texas. It has about 2,000 members from seven states. The association's role is to commemorate the memory of the early Canarian community and of the first settlers and cattle ranchers of Texas. On September 10, 1982, Governor William P. Clements rewarded the family for retaining the Canarian culture, a unique aspect of Texas heritage.
