= Salvador Rodríguez (regidor) =

Spanish politician

Salvador Rodrígez (1688–?) was a Spanish politician who served as regidor in San Antonio, Texas. His family arrived in San Antonio from the Canary Islands, Spain, in 1731 with other Canarian families to bring order and populate this border region with French Louisiana.

== Biography ==
He was born about 1688 in Lanzarote, Canary Islands, Spain. His parents were Francisco Rodriguez and Isabel de los Reyes, natives from Tenerife. In Canary, he was a cheese maker, but in 1730 he and his family emigrated to San Antonio, where they arrived in 1731 with others Canarian families in order populate this region. He arrived to San Antonio when he was 42 years old. He was regidor of San Antonio.

Rodriguez married the Canarian Maria Perez Cabrera (native from Lanzarote), with who had one child: Patricio Rodríguez.
