= Antonio Rodríguez Medero =

Texas politician

10th Mayor of San Antonio
- In office 1741–?
- Preceded by: Juan Delgado
- Succeeded by: Patricio Rodríguez

Personal details
- Born: 1712 Canary Islands, Spain possibly
- Died: April 10, 1760 (aged 47–48) San Antonio, Texas
- Spouse: Josefa de Niz
- Profession: Labrador, architect, acequiero, contractor, businessman and mayor of San Antonio (1741).

Antonio Rodríguez Medero (1712 – April 10, 1760) was the mayor of San Antonio, Texas, in 1741. He was one of the first settlers in San Antonio. He laid the foundation for the creation of the first "heritage of water" (private water galleries that pass from generation to generation that were developed in the Canary Islands) in the United States. He was also the architect of the construction of several canals to irrigate the lands of the Canarian settlers in San Antonio. These heritage of water would serve as a model for all those that were created later in San Antonio.

== Biography ==
=== Early years ===
Antonio Rodriguez Medero was born around 1712, and was the son of Juan Rodriguez and Maria del Carmen Mederos. The family lived in Tamaraceite, a neighborhood in Las Palmas city, in the island of Gran Canaria (Canary Island, Spain), possibly. His father, who worked in the Heredad of Waters (in English: Heritage of water) of Tenoya, in Gran Canaria, drowned in a flood of the Tenoya ravine, trying to save his neighbors when Antonio was a child. His family was wealthy, allowing Rodriguez Medero the ability to learn to read and write. From an early age he worked with his father in the irrigation and repair of canals in Heredad of waters de Tenoya, in Gran Canaria.

At age 18, when the Spanish Crown ordered sending of ten or eleven Canarian families to Texas in order to establish and populate a city in this territory, he decided to travel to the place and, with his girlfriend, Josefa de Niz, and her parents, they departed from the port of Las Palmas, in late February or early March 1730 in the sloop "San Telmo", captained by Juan Rodríguez Master, to the port of Santa Cruz de Tenerife. On 27 March, after the start was delayed, due to no fault of the migrants, they departed to the Caribbean and then to Veracruz, continuing through Mexico to Texas.

=== Life in San Antonio ===
He arrived on March 9, 1731, at their destination, the presidio of San Antonio. On July 20, 1731, after creating the first Council in the town of San Antonio, he was appointed "Mayordomo de la nueva Villa" (in English: "Butler of the new Ville", thanks to him being one of the few settlers who could read and write), a position that meant he would be held responsible for the administration of public funds and supervision of public works. He held the position until 1736, when he was Regidor 4th. During these early years of stay in the newly created village, their dedications are known as Labrador, acequiero, contractor and businessman, in addition to its social work in the village. So, basing on their knowledge of hydraulic engineering, organization of owners, etc.. he was the architect of the construction of two canals that were used to supply water to missions and settlers: The irrigation ditch "la Conception" (1732), that irrigated the missions, and the irrigation ditch of "San Pedro "(1738), which would give drink to the settlers.

The fact that he finished the first channel catering to the missions, caused him problems with the settlers, but also received special favors from the monks, who ceded Amerindians for that, as he directed the construction of the canal, they should work and look after their land, which made Rodriguez could engage in work that the rest of the colonists could not do and, while their neighbors to repent by treatment with him due to this special treatment for the missionaries.

He even went on to become in Judge of the Villa, and at the summit in 1741 was appointed Mayor. Because of the problems mentioned above, in June 1749, he was accused by neighbors and was imprisoned for abuse of power, but this was, apparently, a plan to discredit him because of the prestige that over time he had acquired in the villa. Subsequently, on October 30, 1750, he was ordered to be released, after many vicissitudes.

Rodríguez Mederos died relatively young on April 10, 1760, and is buried in the Cathedral of San Fernando.

== Personal life ==
After arriving in Veracruz, Rodriguez Medero married Josefa de Niz, daughter of the future mayor of San Antonio, Manuel de Niz, between 27 August and 15 November 1730, in Quaticlan, Mexico, before arriving in San Antonio. One of his sons was named Prudencio Rodriguez. According to a description that has come down to us, Antonio was of medium height, broad-shouldered, white, flat nose, gray eyes, brown hair and eyebrows, plump face pockmarked, and a hawthorn in the right cheek.
