= List of Spanish Americans =

This is a list of notable Americans who self-identify as Americans of Spanish descent, including both original immigrants who obtained American citizenship and their American descendants.

Many Americans in the United States also have origins via the large Spanish diaspora (for example Hispanic America) who self-identify their ancestors in census data as being Spaniard, Spanish or Spanish American.

== List ==
=== Artists and designers ===
- Adela Akers (1933–2023) – Textile artist
- Mabel Alvarez (1891–1985) – Artist
- Carlos Baena (born 1974) – Pixar animator
- Javier Cabada (born 1931) – Artist
- Eva Camacho-Sánchez – Fashion designer
- Federico Castellón (1914–1971) – Painter and sculptor
- Beatriz Colomina (born 1952) – Architecture historian
- Julio de Diego (1900–1979) – Visual artist
- Anh Duong (born 1960) – French-American artist, actress, and model born
- John A. Garcia (born 1949) – Entrepreneur and philanthropist
- Frank Garcia (1927–1993)
- Xavier Gonzalez (1898–1993) – Artist
- Iñigo Manglano-Ovalle (born 1961) – Artist
- Domingo Mora (1840–1911) – Spanish-born American sculptor and architectural sculptor
- F. Luis Mora (1874–1940) – Uruguayan-born American figural painter. Son of Domingo Mora
- Jo Mora (1876–1947) – Uruguayan-born American photographer, cartoonist, illustrator, painter, sculptor, and historian. Son of Domingo Mora
- Adele Morales (1925–2015) – Painter and memoirist
- Wenceslao Moreno (1896–1999) – Ventriloquist
- Stephen Mopope (1898–1974) – Kiowa painter, dancer, and flute player
- Victor Moscoso (born 1936) – Psychedelic underground comix cartoonist
- Esteban Munras (1798–1850) – 19th-century artist

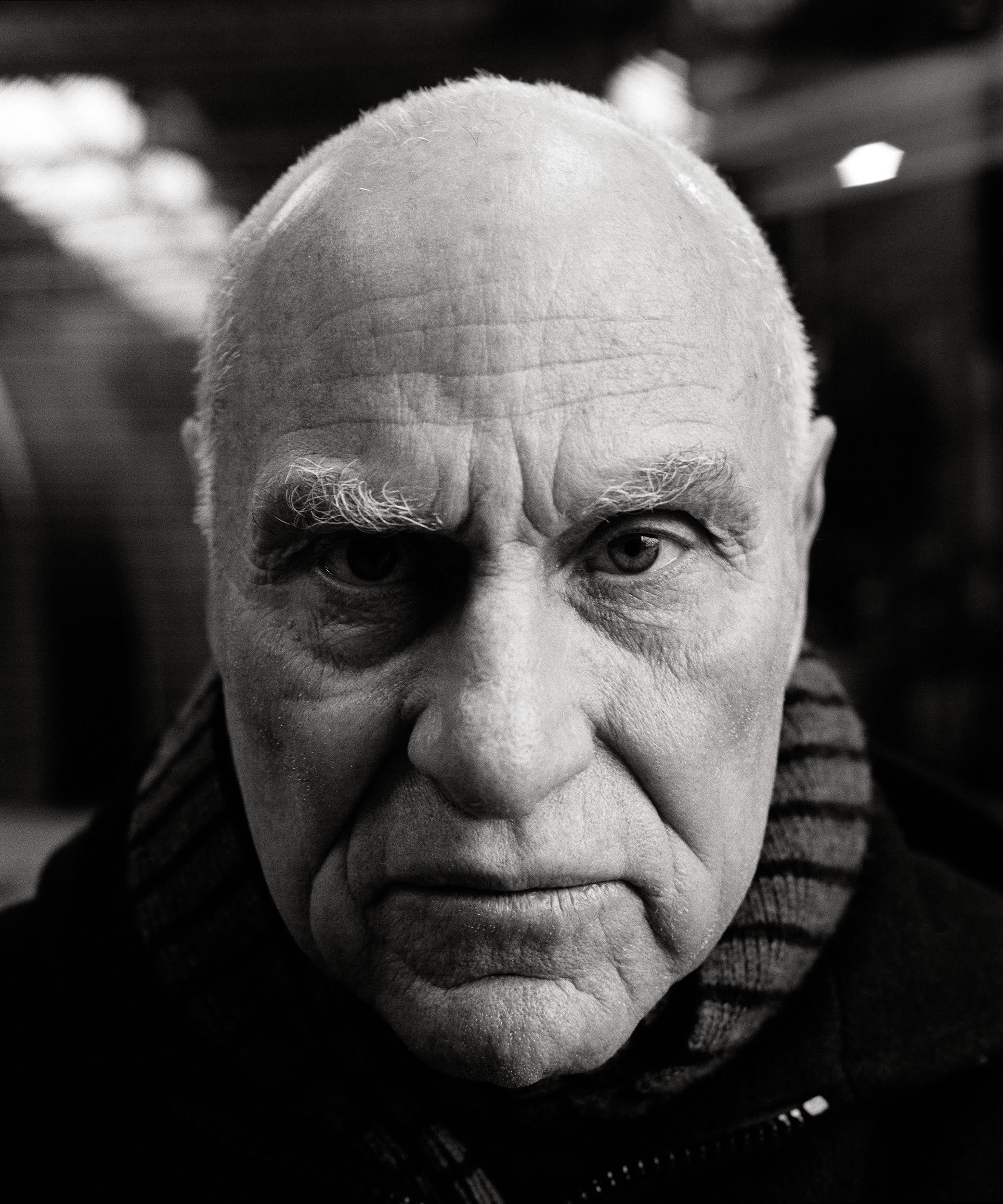
Sculptor Richard Serra

- Antonio Prieto (1912–1967) – Ceramic artist and art professor
- Faye Resnick (born 1957) – Television personality, author, and interior designer
- Narciso Rodriguez (born 1961) – Fashion designer
- Richard Serra (1938–2024) – Sculptor
- Urbici Soler i Manonelles (1890–1953) – Sculptor and art educator
- Carmen Marc Valvo (born 1963) – Fashion designer
- Kat Von D (born 1982) – Tattoo artist

=== Business ===
- Micaela Almonester, Baroness de Pontalba (1795–1874) – Aristocrat, businesswoman and real estate developer
- John Arrillaga (1937–2022) – Real estate businessman
- John Casablancas (1942–2013) – Modeling agent and scout
- Manuel Lisa (1772–1820) – Fur trader, explorer, and United States Indian agent
- Frank Lorenzo (born 1940) – Airline executive
- Juan de Miralles (1713–1780) – Arms dealer and messenger to the American Continental Congress
- Edward L. Romero (born 1934) – Entrepreneur and diplomat
- Frank Stephenson (born 1959) – Automobile designer
- Unanue family
  - Andy Unanue (born 1967) – Former vice president of Goya Foods
  - Joseph A. Unanue (1925–2013) – Former president of Goya Foods
- Rodolfo Valentin (born 1944) – Hairdresser and entrepreneur
- Benito Vázquez (1738–1810) – Soldier, fur trader, merchant, and explorer
- Louis Vasquez (1798–1868) – Mountain man and trader
- Vicente Martinez Ybor (1818–1896) – Industrialist and Cuban cigar manufacturer

=== Entertainment ===
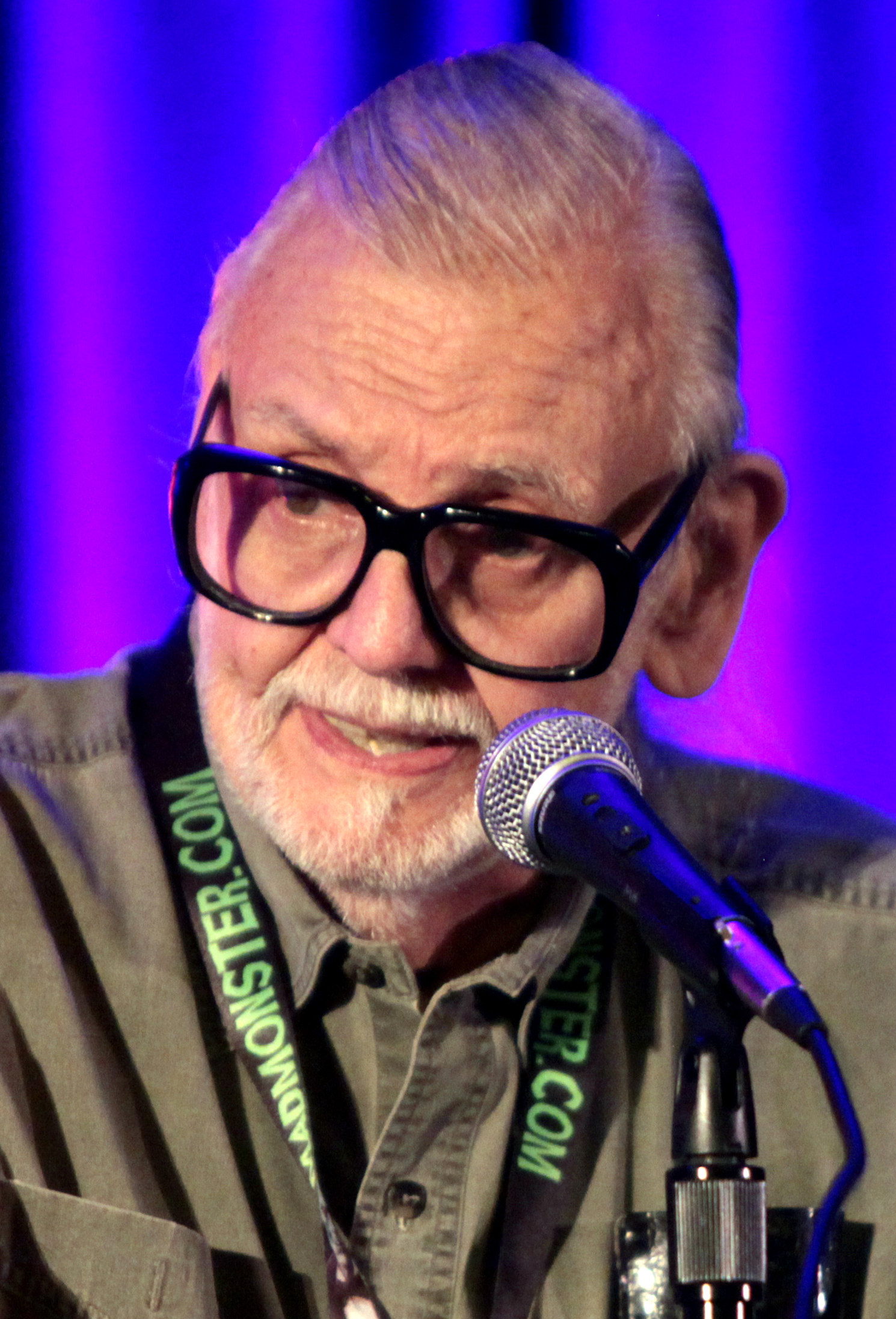
George A. Romero

==== Film and television screenwriters, directors and producers ====
- Rafael Alvarez (born 1958) – Screenwriter
- Miguel Arteta (born 1965) – Film and television director
- Rafael Casal (born 1985) – Writer, actor, producer, and showrunner
- Jaume Collet-Serra (born 1974) – Film director and producer
- Lisa Loomer (born 1950) – Playwright and screenwriter
- George A. Romero (1940–2017) – Film director, screenwriter and film editor
- Carles Torrens (born 1984) – Film and television director, screenwriter, editor, and producer

==== Actors and actresses ====
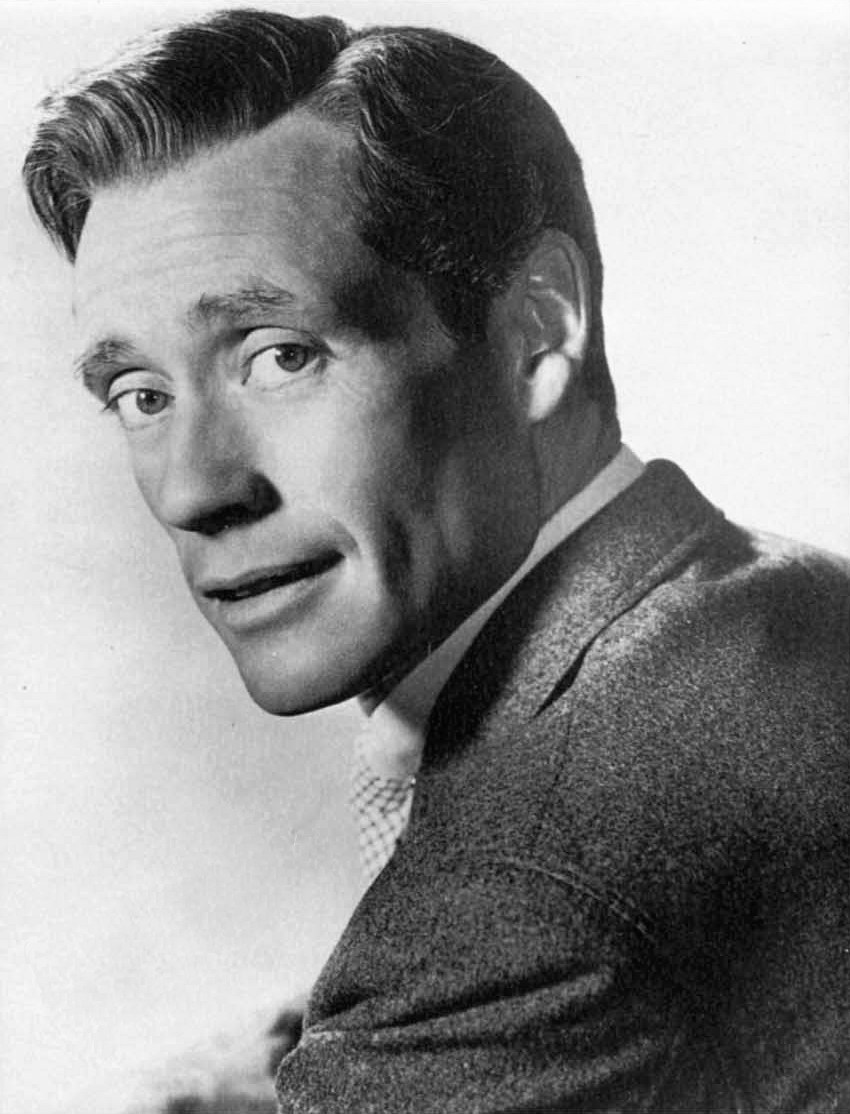
Mel Ferrer

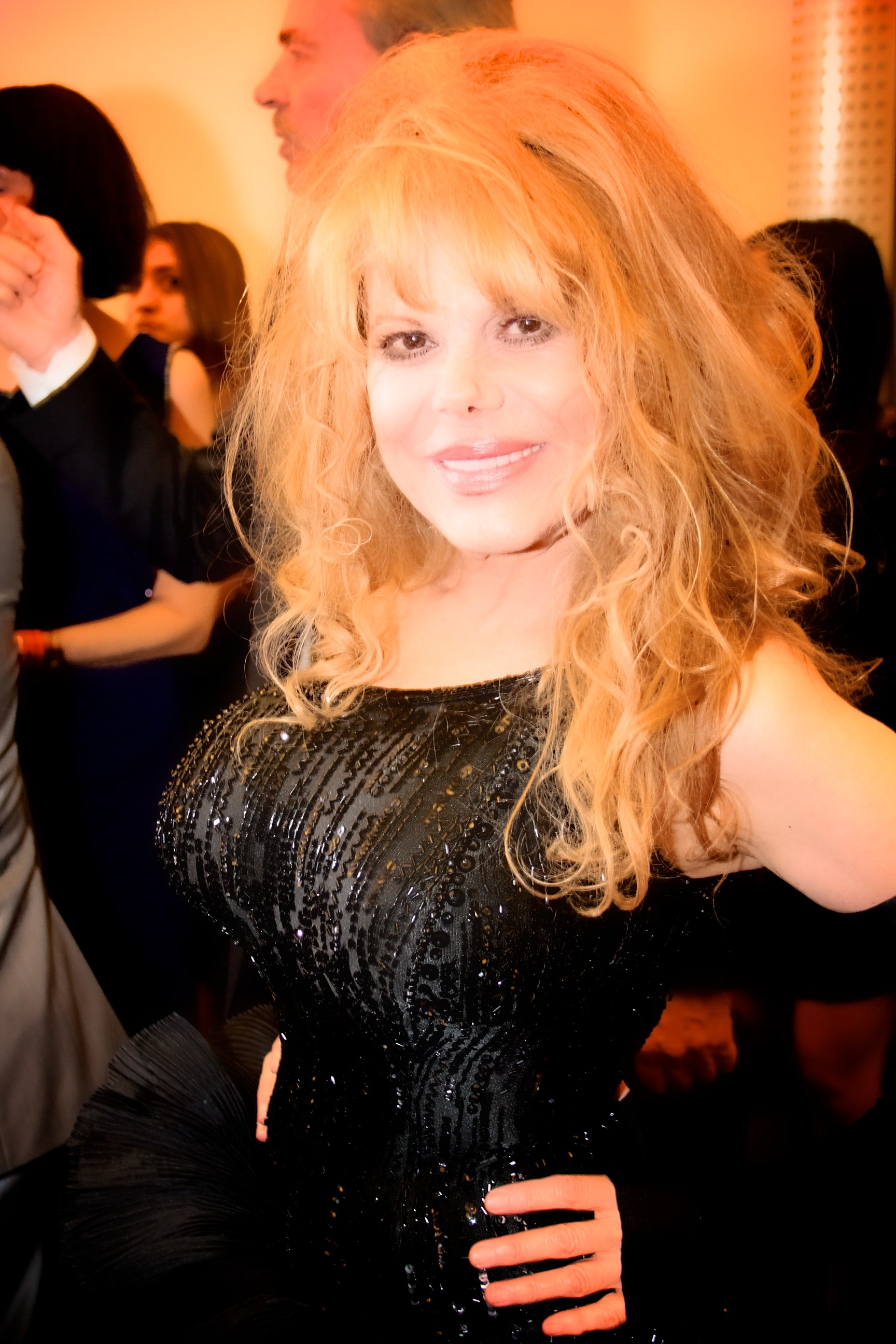
Charo

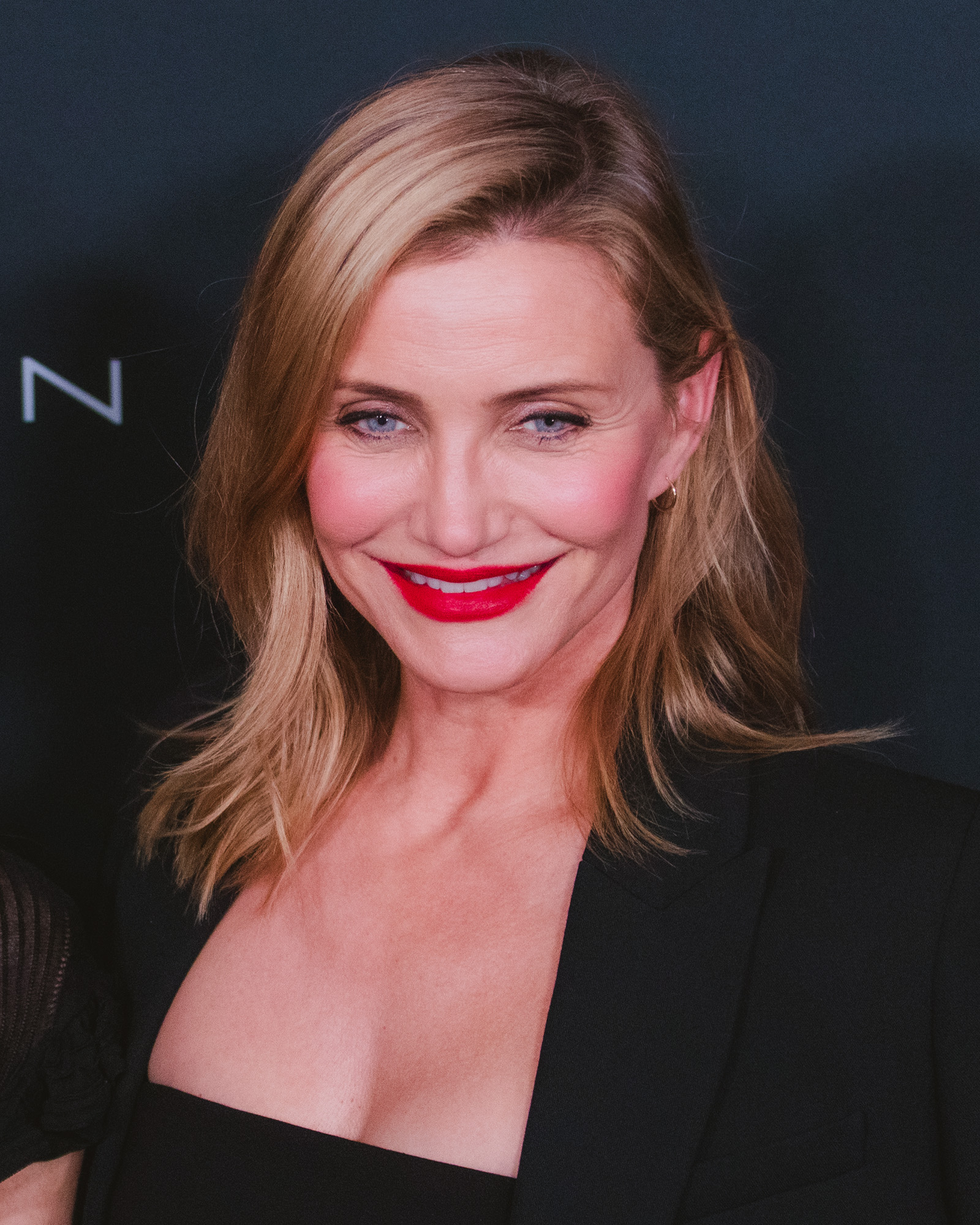
Cameron Diaz

- Luis Alberni (1886–1962)
- Maria Alba (1905–1999) – Film actress
- Trini Alvarado (born 1967)
- Antonio Banderas (born 1960)
- Armida (1911–1989) – Actress, singer, dancer, and vaudevillian
- Tina Aumont (1946–2006)
- Ariana Barouk (born 1982) – TV host, actress, model, and singer
- Joan Bennett (1910–1990) – Stage, film and television actress
- Constance Bennett (1904–1965)
- Barbara Bennett (1906–1958) – Actress and dancer
- Maria Canals-Barrera (born 1966) – Actress, voice actress and singer
- Ouida Bergère (1886–1974)
- Carlos Bernard
- Alexis Knapp
- Paloma Bloyd
- Fortunio Bonanova (1895–1969) – Baritone singer and film, theater, and television actor.
- Diego Boneta – Actor and singer
- Richard Cansino – Voice actor
- Leo Carrillo (1881–1961) – Actor, vaudevillian, political cartoonist, and conservationist
- Charisma Carpenter
- Lynda Carter – Actress and singer
- Jessica Chastain
- Patricia Clarkson
- Imogene Coca (1908–2001)
- Mark Dacascos – Actor and martial artist
- Richard Davalos (1930–2016)
- Ana De Armas
- Cameron Diaz (born 1972) – Actress. Her father's family emigrated from Cádiz, in Andalusia, to Cuba, and later to the United States

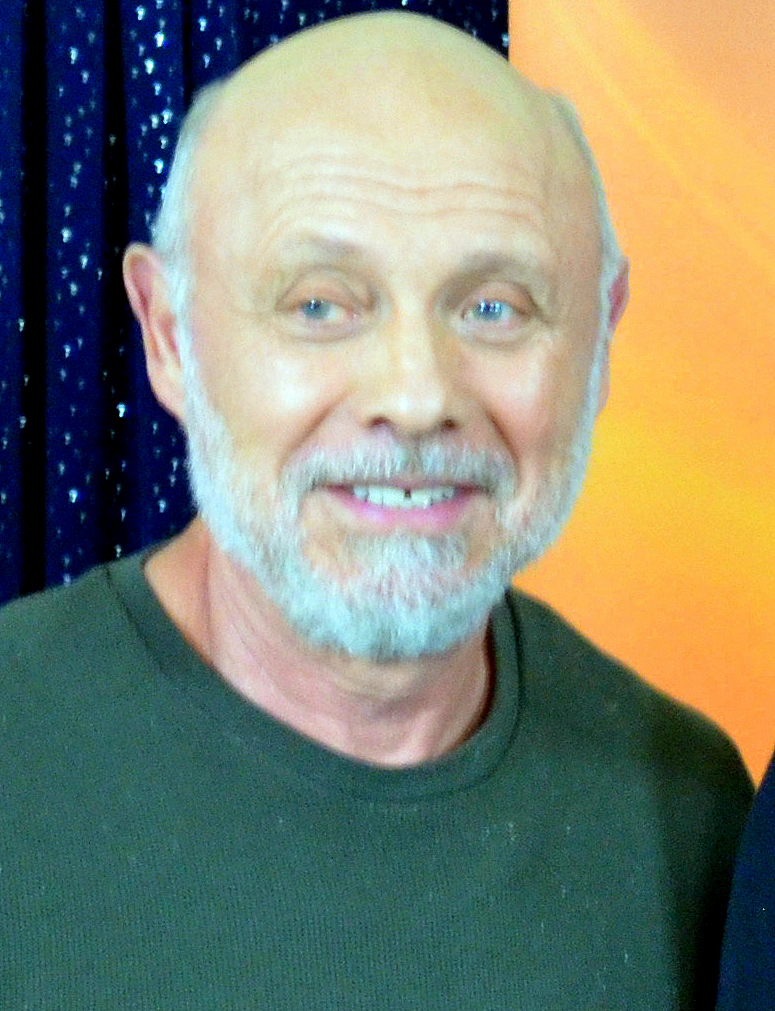
Héctor Elizondo

- Héctor Elizondo
- Joe Estevez
- Emilio Estevez – Actor, director, and writer
- Ramón Estévez
- Renée Estévez
- Mel Ferrer (1917–2008) – Actor, stage director and screen and film producer
- Àstrid Bergès-Frisbey
- Santino Fontana – Actor, director, and composer
- Trixie Friganza (1870–1955)
- Martin Garralaga (1894–1981) – Film and television actor
- Dominik Garcia-Lorido
- Jesse Garcia
- Joanna García
- William Gaxton (1893–1963) – Film and theater actor
- Greg Giraldo (1965–2010) – Stand-up comic
- Lita Grey (1908–1995)
- Thomas Gomez (1905–1971)
- Myrtle Gonzalez (1891–1918) – Silent film actress
- Paz Vega (born 1976)
- Pedro Gonzalez-Gonzalez (1925–2006) – Character actor
- Camille Guaty
- Lena Hall – Actress and singer

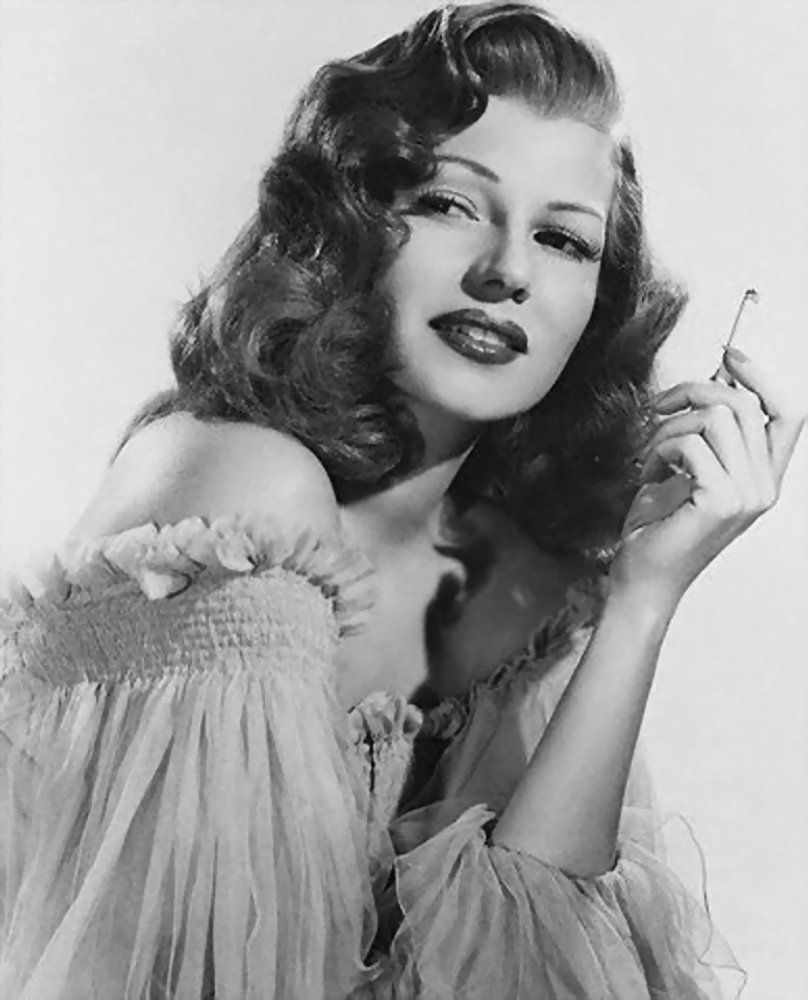
Rita Hayworth (Margarita Cansino)

- Rita Hayworth (1918–1987)
- Tom Hernández (1915–1984)
- Pepe Hern (1927–2009)
- Gaby Hoffmann
- Mikaela Hoover
- Paz de la Huerta – Indie actress
- Anya Taylor-Joy – Actress and model
- Lainie Kazan (born 1940) – Actress and singer
- Dorothy Lamour (1914–1996)
- Jeanie MacPherson (1886–1946) – Actress, writer, and director
- Roma Maffia

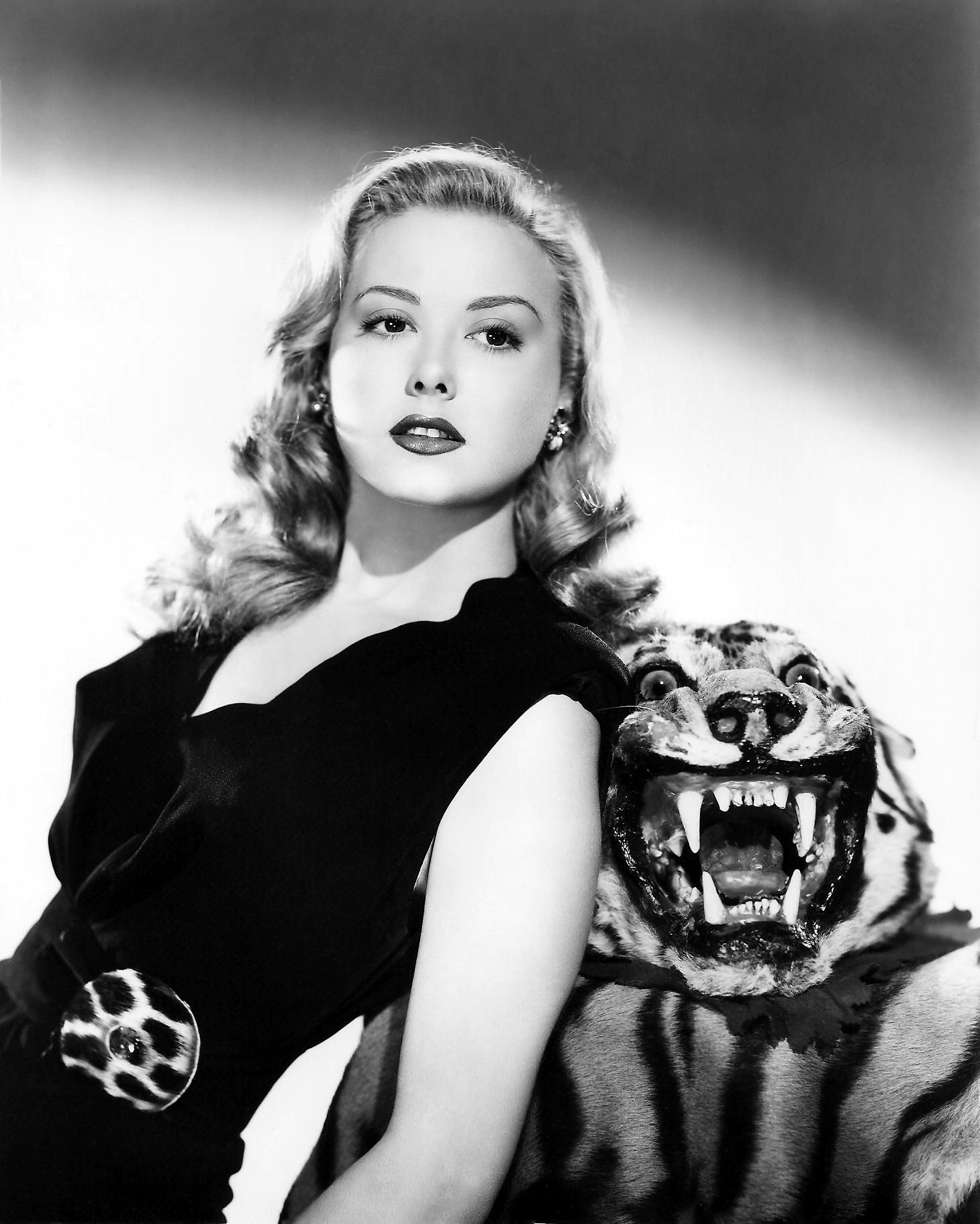
Adele Mara

- Adele Mara (1923–2010)
- A Martinez
- Velia Martinez (1920–1993) – Actress, singer and former nightclub dancer
- Patricia Medina (1919–2012)
- Beryl Mercer (1882–1939) – Stage and screen actress
- Lea Michele – Actress and singer
- Marta Milans
- Alfred Molina
- Ricardo Montalbán (1920–2009) – Radio, television, theatre and film actor
- Carlos Montalbán
- Amber Montana
- Yolanda "Tongolele" Montes – Exotic dancer and Cinema of Mexico actress
- Antonio Moreno (1887–1967)
- Frank Morgan (1890–1949)
- Morris W. Morris (1845–1906) – Stage actor and Civil War soldier
- Frankie Muniz – Actor and racecar driver
- Dylan O'Brien
- Margaret O'Brien – Child actress
- Christina Ochoa – Actress
- Carlos Pena Jr. – Actor, singer, and dancer
- Julio Perillán
- Anita Pomares, better known as Anita Page – Film actress
- Monica Ramon
- Nathalia Ramos – Actress and singer
- Monica Rial – Voice actress, script writer, and ADR director
- Natalie Rial – Voice actress
- Génesis Rodríguez
- Gilbert Roland (1905–1994) – American actor
- Cesar Romero (1907–1994) – American actor of Spanish father
- Ned Romero – Actor and opera singer
- Anthony Ruivivar
- Marin Sais – Silent film actress
- Ref Sanchez (1917–1986)
- Tessie Santiago – actress
- Reni Santoni – Film, television and voice actor
- April Scott – Actress and model
- Sarah Shahi – Actress and model of Spanish mother

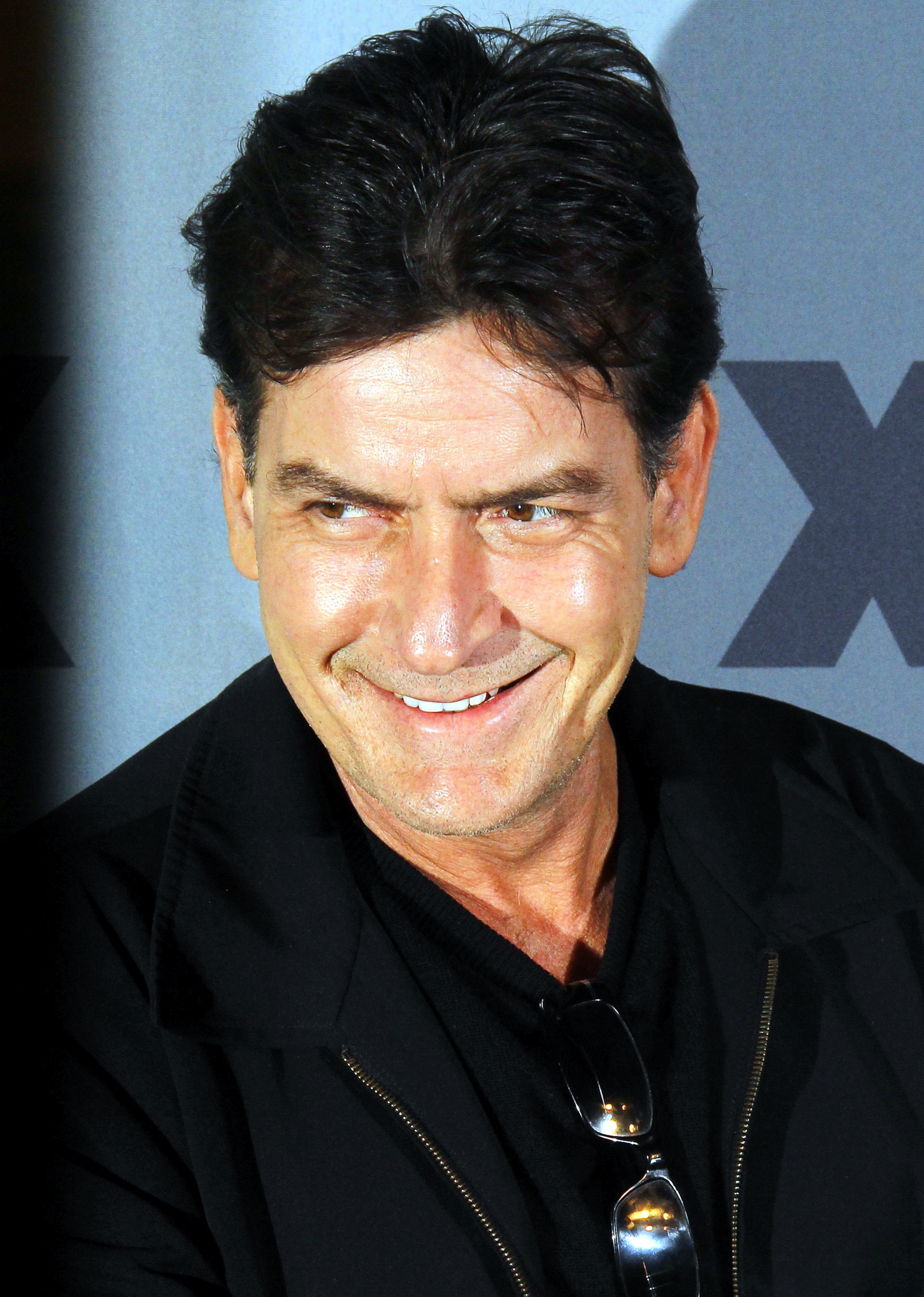
Charlie Sheen.

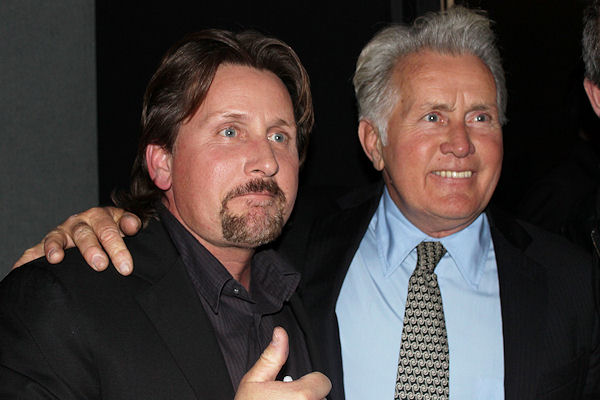
Emilio Estevez with father Martin Sheen at the premiere of The Way.

- Martin Sheen
- Charlie Sheen
- Margarita Sierra (1936–1963)
- Henry Silva – Film and television actor
- Chrishell Stause
- Celeste Thorson – Actress, model, screenwriter, and activist
- Bitsie Tulloch
- Alanna Ubach

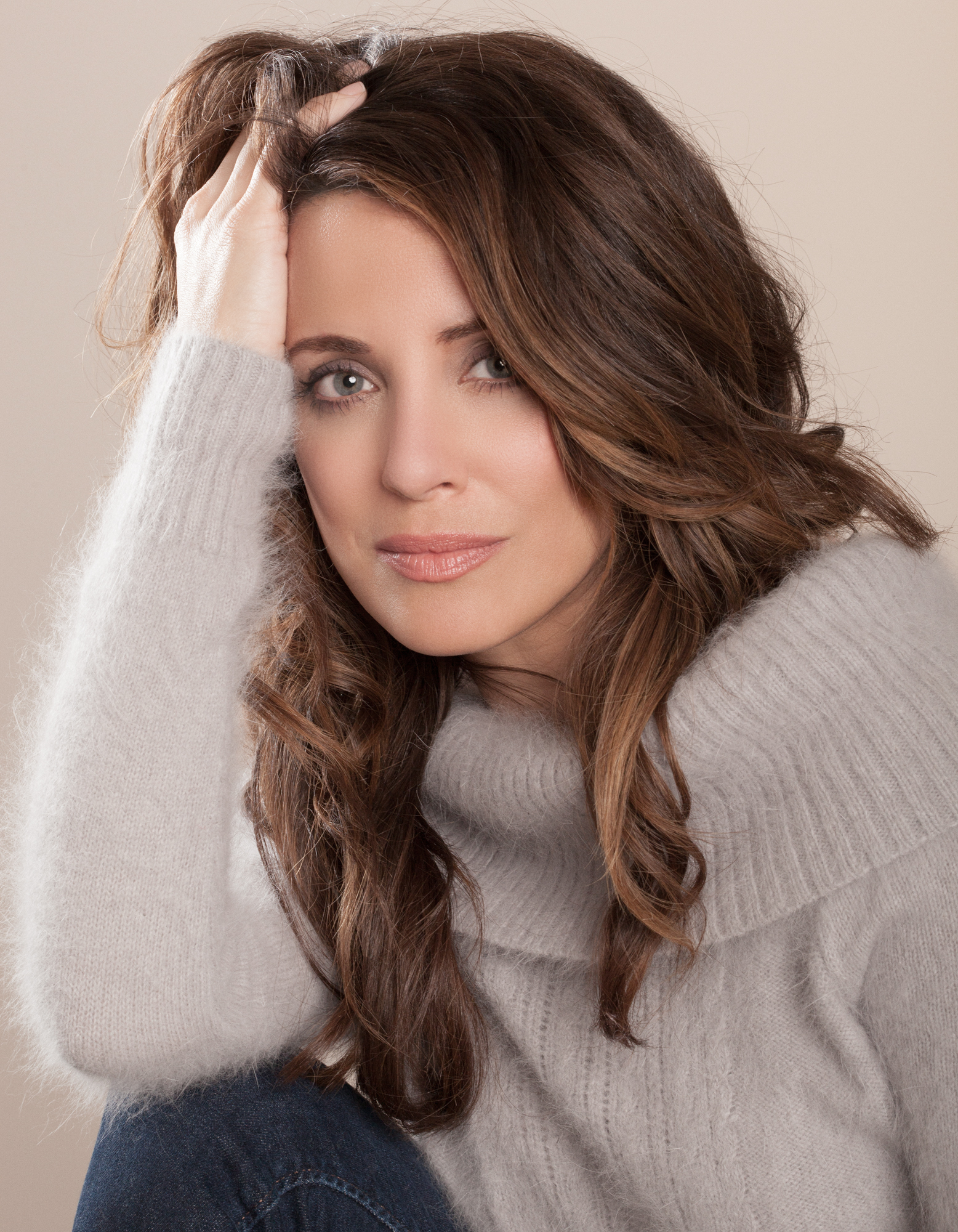
Alanna Ubach

- Erik Valdez
- Elena Verdugo
- Shailene Woodley
- Michael Wayne (1934–2003) – Film producer and actor
- Patrick Wayne

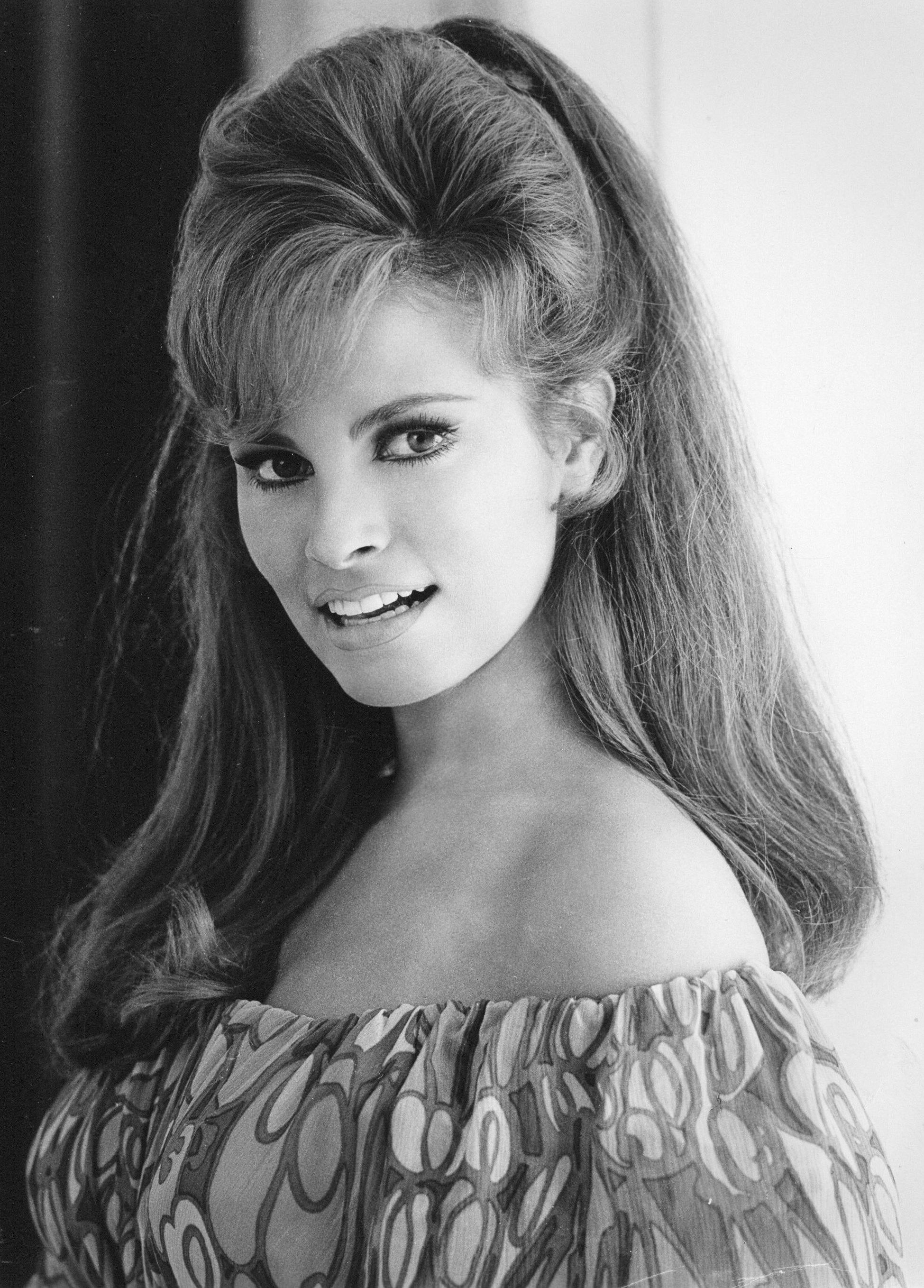
Raquel Welch

- Raquel Welch (1940–2023)
- Donna Wilkes – Film actress

==== Models ====
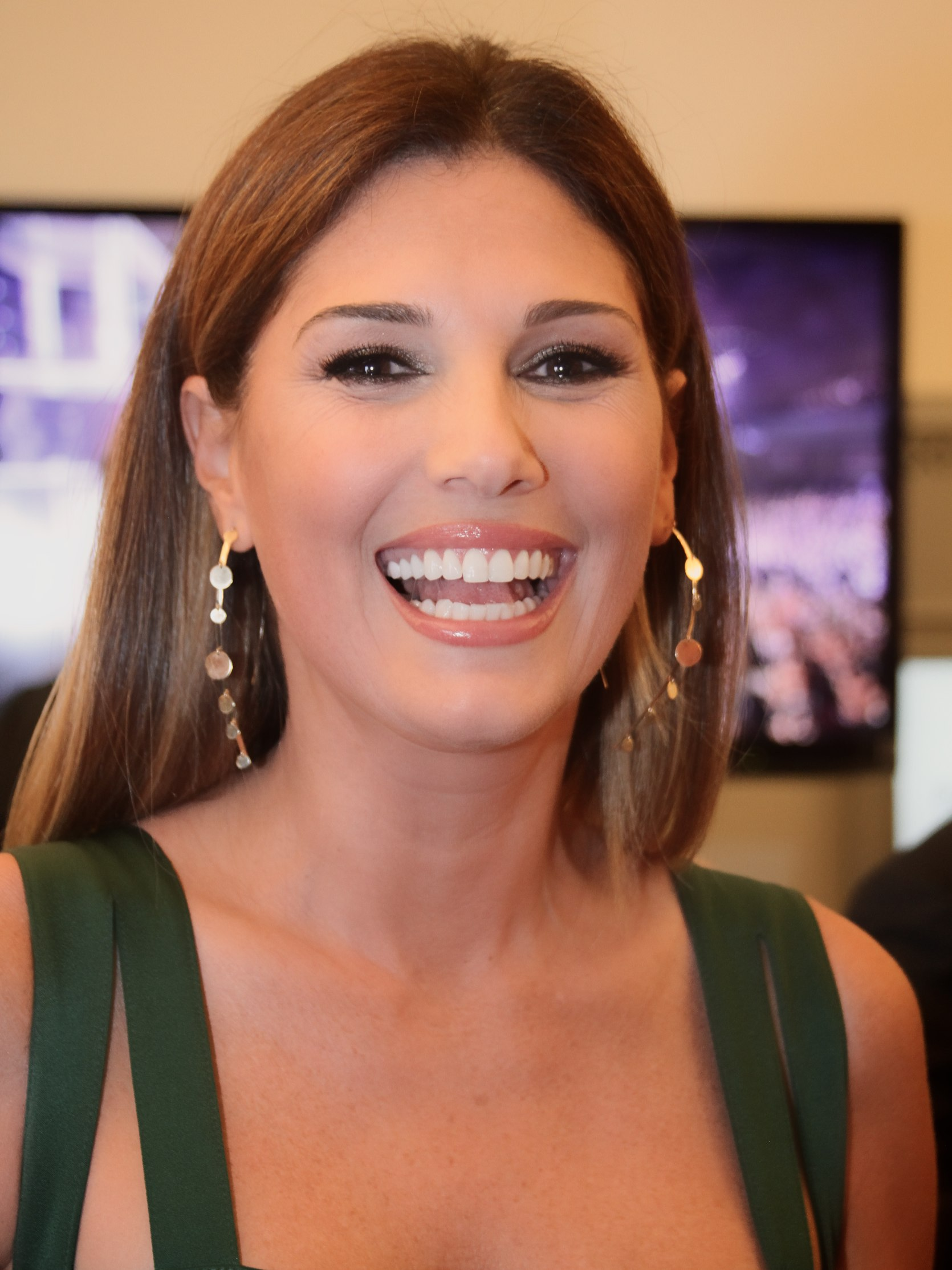
Daisy Fuentes is a TV presenter and model.

- Jimmy Clabots – Actor and mode
- Jo Collins – Playboy magazine's Playmate of the Month and Year
- Devin DeVasquez – Model and actress
- Daisy Fuentes – TV presenter and model
- Jenna Haze – Pornographic actress
- Jewel De'Nyle – Pornographic actress and director
- Chanel Preston – Pornographic actress
- Nia Sanchez – American actress, model, taekwondo coach and beauty queen
- Jenny Spain
- Samantha Torres – Playboy Playmate
- Carmen Xtravaganza (1961–2023) – Model and singer

==== Musicians ====
- David Archuleta
- Cardi B – Rapper
- Leonardo Balada – Composer
- Cedric Bixler-Zavala – Rock singer
- Fortunio Bonanova (1895–1969) – Baritone singer and film, theater, and television actor
- Eduardo Cansino, Sr. (1895–1968) – Flamenco dancer and actor
- Julian Casablancas – Vocalist and songwriter for The Strokes
- Al Cisneros – Singer and bassist for Sleep
- Nichole Cordova – Singer and dancer for Girlicious.
- Xavier Cugat (1900–1990) – Conductor, artist, and entrepreneur
- Charo – Actress, comedian and Flamenco guitarist
- Chick Corea – Jazz and fusion pianist, keyboardist, and composer
- Jonny Diaz – Contemporary Christian pop artist
- Vernon Duke (1903–1969) – Composer and songwriter
- Gloria Estefan
- Joe Falcón (1900–1965) – Accordionist
- Lilian García – Singer and ring announce
- Jerry Garcia – Guitarist and singer for the Grateful Dead
- Synyster Gates – Musician and lead guitarist of Avenged Sevenfold
- Claudio S. Grafulla (1812–1880) – 19th century composer
- Emilio de Gogorza (1874–1949) – Baritone
- Safeway Goya – Singer
- Scott Herren – Music producer
- Eric Himy – Classical pianist
- Julio Iglesias – Singer
- Enrique Iglesias – Grammy-winning Spanish pop singer and songwriter
- José Iturbi (1895–1980) – Conductor, harpsichordist and pianist
- Jeanette (singer) – Singer
- Joseph Lacalle (1860–1937) – Clarinetist, composer, conductor and music critic
- Kirstin Maldonado – Singer
- Jim Martin (born 1961) – Former guitarist of Faith No More
- Steve Martin Caro – Original lead singer of The Left Banke
- Mikaila – Singer
- Chino Moreno
- Alcide "Yellow" Núñez (1884–1934) – Jazz clarinetist

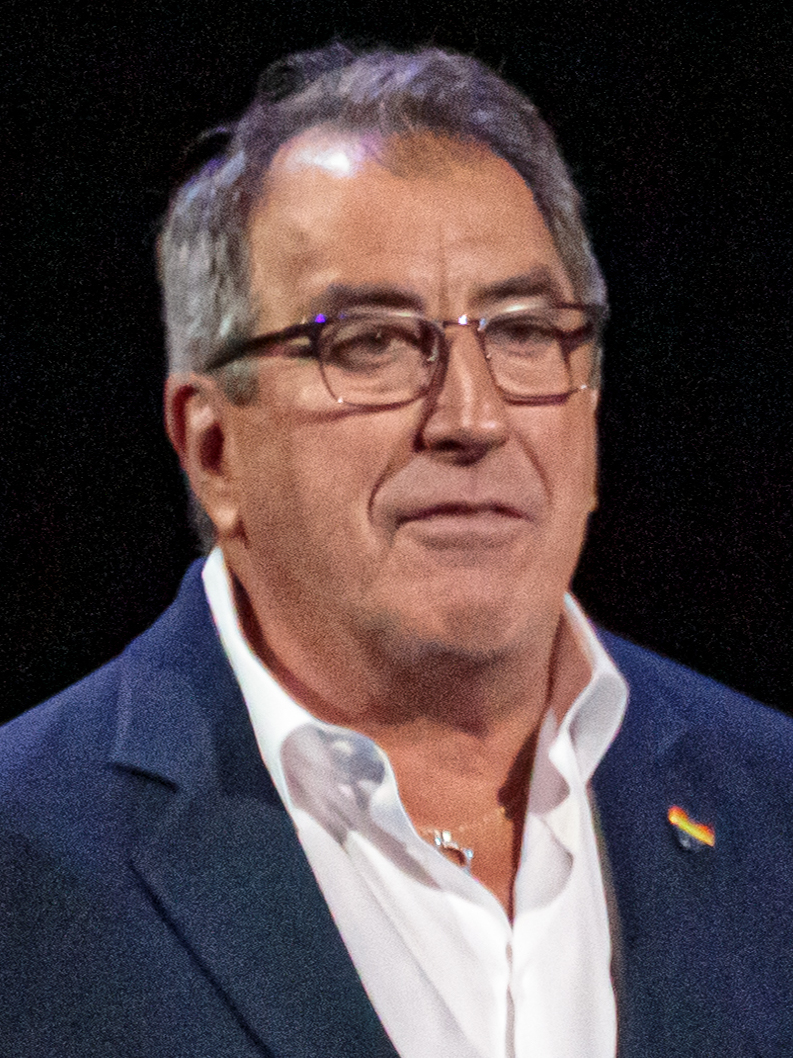
Kenny Ortega

- Kenny Ortega – Emmy Award-winning producer, director and choreographer
- Franky Perez – Musician and singer for Apocalyptica
- Irván J. "Puco" Pérez (1923–2008)
- Manuel Perez (musician) (1871–1946) – Cornetist and bandleaderAchille Rivarde (1865–1940) – Violinist and teacher
- Rosalía (born 1992) – Singer
- Andy Russell (1919–1992) – Vocalist
- Paul Sanchez – Guitarist, singer-songwriter, and founding member of Cowboy Mouth
- Matthew Santos – Rock and folk singer-songwriter, musician, and painter
- Carly Simon – Singer-songwriter, musician, and children's author
- Lucy Simon – Composer
- Joanna Simon (mezzo-soprano)
- Mariee Sioux – Folk singer-songwriter
- John Philip Sousa (1854–1932) – Late Romantic era composer and conductor
- Esperanza Spalding – Jazz singer and composer
- Malu Trevejo – Singer
- Anton Torello – Double bass player
- Jaci Velasquez – Singer
- Camille Zamora – Soprano

==== Dancers ====
- María Benítez – Dancer, choreographer and director in Spanish dance and flamenco
- Carmencita – American-style dancer in pre-vaudeville and music-hall ballet
- Joaquín De Luz – Ballet dancer

==== Sports ====
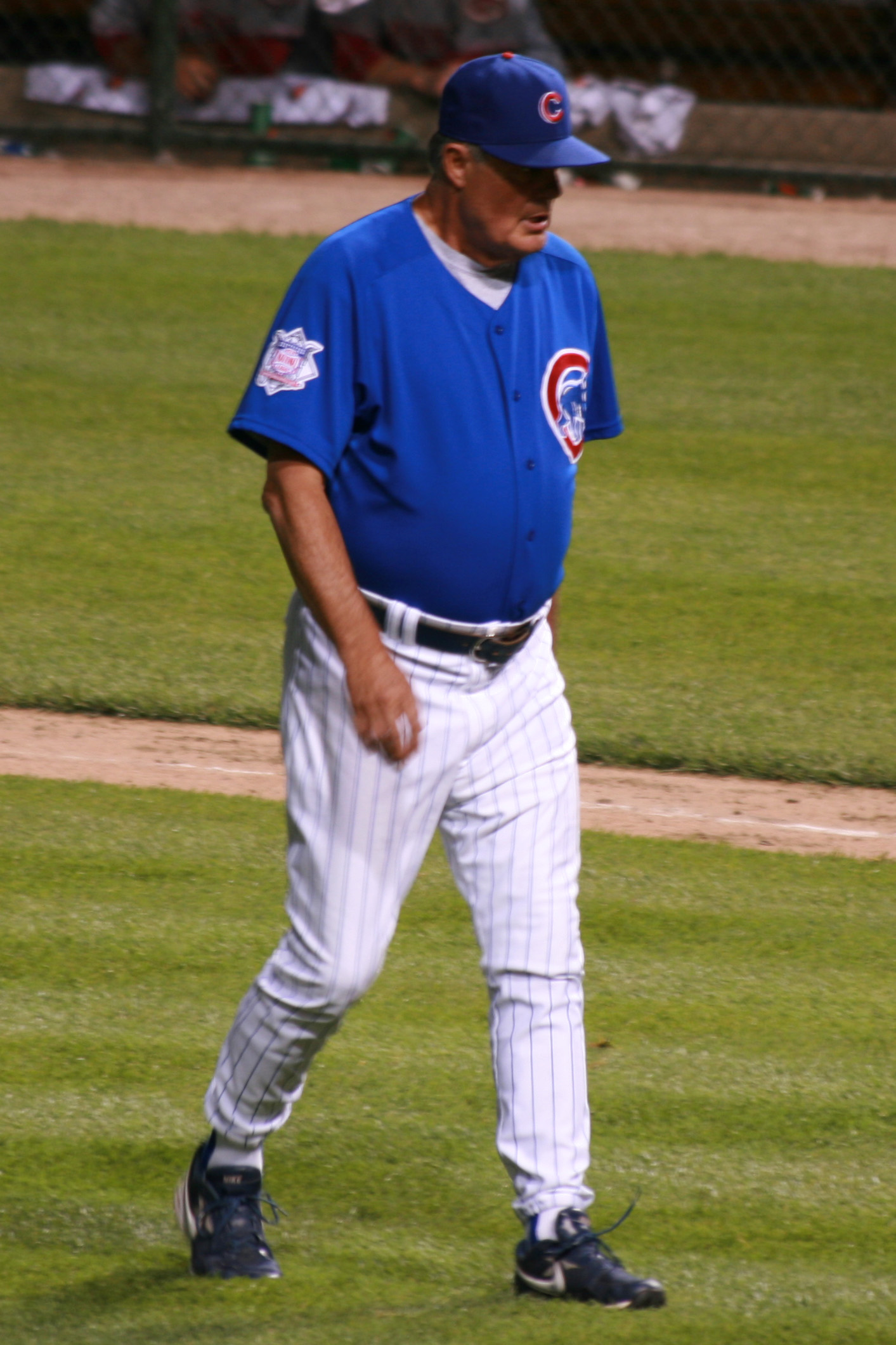
Lou Piniella

- Pete Alonso – Mets first baseman and 2019 Rookie of the Year. His grandfather was born in Spain and fought for the republicans during the Spanish Civil War. He came to America after Franco overthrew the republic.
- Barry Alvarez – American football coach. His grandparents immigrated to the United States from Northern Spain.
- Lyle Alzado (1949–1992) – professional American football defensive end of the National Football League. His father is of Italian-Spanish descent.
- Art Aragon (1927–2008) – American boxer
- J. J. Arcega-Whiteside – American football player born in Zaragoza, Spain. His father is Spanish and mother is American.
- Paula Badosa (born 1997) – professional tennis player who represents Spain, was born in Manhattan. Her parents are from Barcelona.
- Jonathan Borrajo – American soccer player of Spanish parents.
- Gene Brito (1925–1965) – American football Defensive end in the National Football League. He was of Spanish and Mexicans parents.
- Pete Carril – American former basketball coach.
- Matt Diaz – American professional baseball outfielder for the Miami Marlins of Major League Baseball. His brother is Jonny Diaz. His grandfather who had emigrated from Barcelona.
- Luca de la Torre – professional soccer player. Father is from Spain.
- Mary Joe Fernández – professional tennis player and two-time Olympic gold medal winner. Father from Spain.
- Daniel Figueroa – American baseball player
- Paco Figueroa – American baseball player
- Santiago Formoso (1953-) – Spanish-born American soccer defender who spent five seasons in the North American Soccer League.
- Lefty Gomez – born Vernon Louis Gomez, New York Yankees Hall of Fame pitcher. His grandfather was Spaniard.
- Keith Hernandez – MVP-winning baseball player, grandfather from Málaga, Spain.
- Manuel Hernandez (1948-) – Spanish-born American soccer player.
- Chris Gimenez – American professional baseball catcher for the Oakland Athletics.
- Megan Gustafson – American basketball player
- Kane - American professional wrestler.
- Tony La Russa – baseball player and manager, born to Spanish and Italian parents in Ybor City in Tampa Florida.
- Al López – Hall-of-Fame baseball player and manager. Spanish parents.
- David López-Zubero – former college and international swimmer who competed in three Summer Olympics and won an Olympic bronze medal.
- Martin López-Zubero – American born, Spanish Olympian swimmer with dual-citizenship. His father is Spanish
- Mike Lowell – Puerto Rican former professional baseball third baseman in Major League Baseball. His parents were born in Cuba, and are of Irish and Spanish ancestry.
- Dave Magadan – American baseball player and coach
- Saoul Mamby – former professional boxer of Spanish and Jamaican descent.
- Chris Manno – American baseball player
- Alec Martinez – American professional ice hockey player. His paternal grandfather is Spanish.
- Rachel McLish – American female bodybuilding champion, actress and author. Her father was of Spanish ancestry.
- Kimmie Meissner – former competitive figure skater. Her maternal great-grandparents were Spanish immigrants (great-grandfather was from Galicia).
- Midajah – American personal trainer, fitness model and former professional wrestling manager. He is the eldest of four children and is of Norwegian, Irish, Spanish, and French descent.
- Lou Molinet (1904–1976) – first Hispanic-American professional football player to play in the National Football League.
- Lou Piniella – baseball player and manager, Asturian grandparents
- Hernando Planells – assistant coach of the Maine Red Claws of the NBA Development League and former head coach of the Basketball Japan League (BJ) team Ryukyu Golden Kings.
- Augusto Perez – former wheelchair curler.
- Ralph Onis (1908 in Tampa, Florida–1995) – professional baseball.
- Jack Del Rio – American head coach of the Oakland Raiders of the National Football League (NFL), to a father of Spanish and Italian descent.
- Rich Rodriguez – Arizona head football coach.
- Fabri Salcedo (1914–1985) – Spanish-born American soccer player.
- Wendy Lucero-Schayes – American former Olympic diver.
- Nick Schumacher – American baseball
- Gabe Suárez – American baseball
- Craig Torres (bodybuilder)
- Benny Urquidez – kickboxer, martial arts choreographer and actor. His father is descended from Basque Spaniards and Blackfoot Amerindians
- Alejandro Villanueva – offensive tackle, Pittsburgh Steeleers. Parents were born in Spain.
- Minh Vu – American soccer player of Spanish and Vietnamese descent.
- Ted Williams (1918–2002) – American professional baseball player, manager, and World War II and Korean War veteran. His mother was Mexican of Spanish (Basque), Russian, and American Indian descent.

=== Military (excluding those who were also governors or politicians) ===
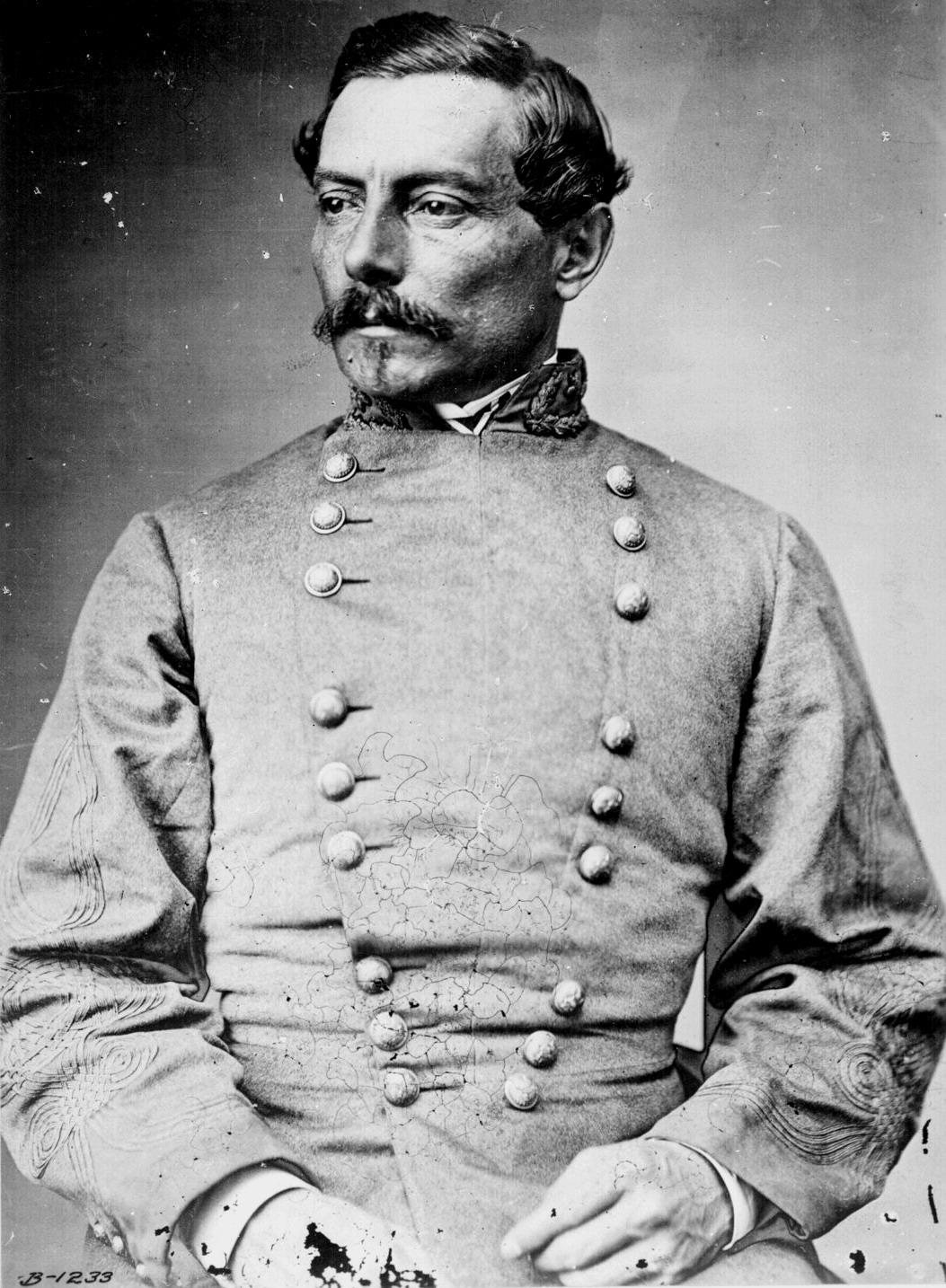
Confederate General G. T. Beauregard

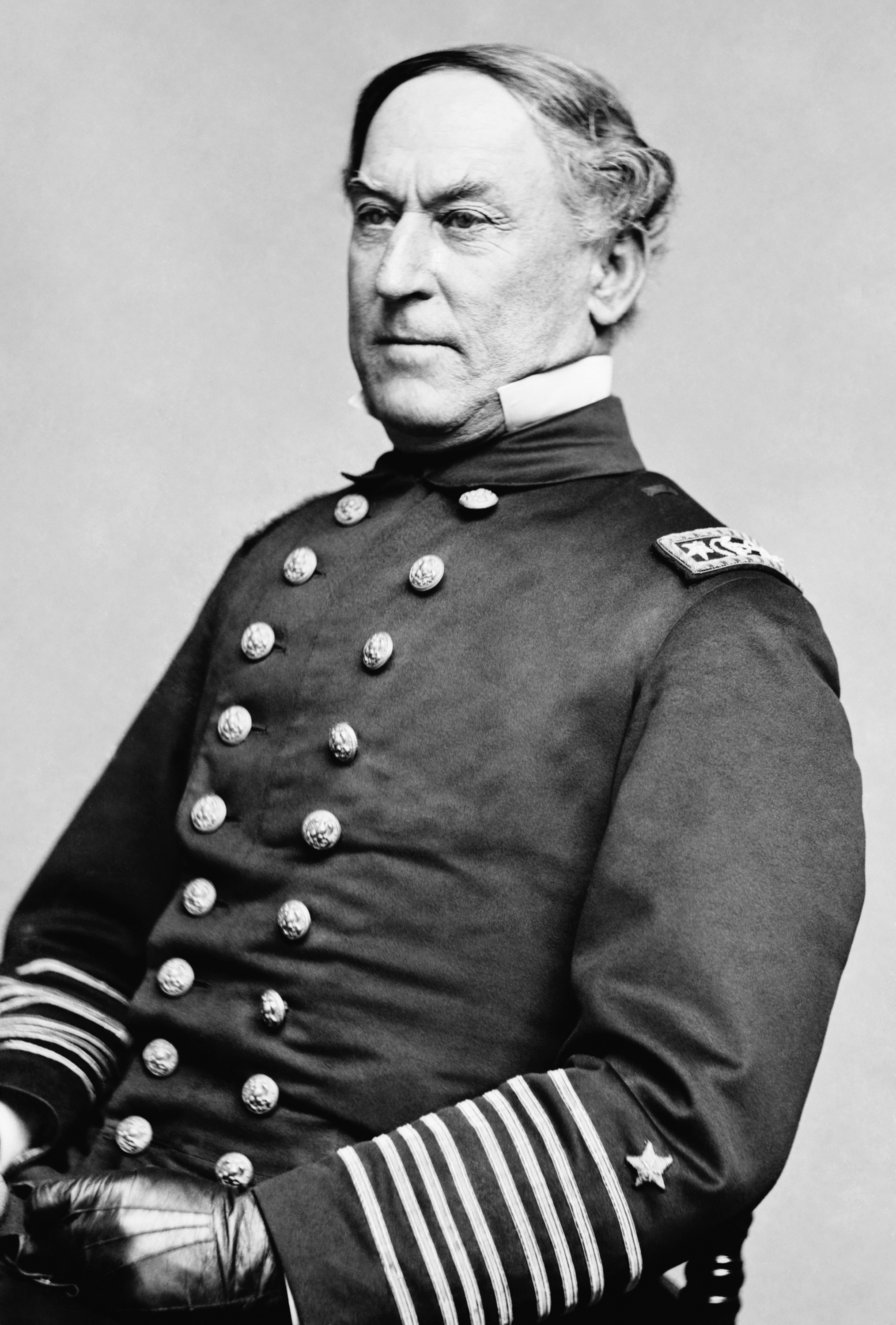
Union Admiral David Farragut

- Santiago Argüello (1791–1862) – soldier in the Spanish army of New Spain in Las Californias, a major Mexican land grant ranchos owner, and part of an influential family in Mexican Alta California and post-statehood California. He was son of Spanish soldier José Darío Argüello
- Terry de la Mesa Allen, Sr. (1888–1969) – Major General, U.S. Army. Decorated World War II Division commander. Allen's maternal grandfather was Spanish Colonel Carlos Alvarez de la Mesa, who fought at Gettysburg for the Union Army in the Spanish Company of the 39th New York Volunteer Infantry Regiment, during the American Civil War.
- Terry de la Mesa Allen Jr. (1929–1967) – Lieutenant Colonel, U.S. Army. Killed in Vietnam War.
- Pierre G. T. Beauregard (1818–1893) American military officer, politician, inventor, writer, civil servant, and the first prominent general of the Confederate States Army during the American Civil War. He was born in a Creole family of French and Spanish descent.
- Santos Benavides (1823–1891) – confederate colonel in the American Civil War. He is descendant of Don Tomas Sanchez, the Spanish founder of Laredo, Texas.
- Stephen Vincent Benét (1827–1895) – officer in the United States Army. His grandfather was a settler of Spanish Florida
- Rudolph B. Davila (1916–2002) – United States Army officer, of Spanish descent through his father, who received the Medal of Honor for his actions in Italy during World War II.
- Luis F. Emilio (1844–1918) – captain in the 54th Massachusetts Volunteer Infantry, an American Civil War Union regiment.
- Jorge Farragut (1755–1817) – Spanish Navy officer who fought for the American War of Independence. Father of David Farragut.
- David Farragut (1801–1870) – first senior officer of the U.S. Navy during the Civil War. Coined phrase "Damn the torpedoes, full speed ahead!". His father was the Spanish Navy officer Jorge Farragut
- John Horse (ca. 1812–1882) – African-American military adviser to the chief Osceola and a leader of Black Seminole units fighting against United States (US) troops during the Seminole Wars in Florida. He was a Seminole slave of Spanish, Seminole, and African American descent.
- Baldomero Lopez (1925–1950) – first lieutenant in the United States Marine Corps during the Korean War; posthumously awarded the Medal of Honor.
- Louis Gonzaga Mendez, Jr. (1915–2001) – highly decorated United States Army officer of the 82nd Airborne Division who in June 1944, as commander of the 3rd Battalion, 508th Parachute Infantry Regiment during World War II, parachuted behind enemy lines into Normandy and was awarded a Distinguished Service Cross for leading an attack that captured the French town of Prétot-Vicquemare, in the Seine-Maritime department. He is descendant of Mexicans, Spanish and Navajo people.
- Juan Moya (1806–1874) – prominent Tejano landowner and Mexican Army captain who fought in the Texas Revolution. He was of Canarian descent.
- John Ortega – first Hispanic sailor to be awarded the United States' highest military decoration for valor in combat – the Medal of Honor – for having distinguished himself during the South Atlantic Blockade by the Union Naval forces during the American Civil War.
- Elwood Richard Quesada (1904–1993) – United States Air Force General, FAA administrator, and, later, a club owner in Major League Baseball. He was of Irish and Spanish descent.
- Maritza Sáenz Ryan – United States Army officer, and the head of the Department of Law at the United States Military Academy. She is the first woman and first Hispanic West Point graduate to serve as an academic department head. She is daughter of a Puerto Rican father and Spanish mother.
- Manuel Antonio Santiago Tarín (1811–1849) – Tejano soldier and a recruiter and participant in the Texas Revolution on the Texian side. His father was a Spanish officer.

=== Governors and politicians ===
- Julian A. Chavez (1808–1879) – rancher, landowner and elected official in early Los Angeles, California, who served multiple terms on the Los Angeles Common Council (the forerunner to the present-day City Council) and the Los Angeles County Board of Supervisors.
- Rafael Anchia – Democratic member of the Texas House of Representatives. His father is a Spanish Basque.
- Jerry Apodaca – Democratic Governor of New Mexico (1974–78).
- Polly Baca – American politician who served as Chair the Democratic Caucus of the Colorado House of Representatives (1976–1979), being the first woman to hold that office, and the first Hispanic woman elected to the Colorado State Senate. She is a descendant of Spanish and Mexican settlers of New Mexico and Colorado, arrived there in the colonial period.
- Judah P. Benjamin (1811–1884) – former senator from Louisiana who also served as the Confederate Attorney General, Secretary of War, and Secretary of State.
- Charles Dominique Joseph Bouligny (1773–1833) – lawyer and politician. He was U.S. Senator from Louisiana between 1824 and 1829. He was son of Francisco Bouligny.
- John Edward Bouligny (1824–1864) – former U.S. representative from Louisiana. Nephew of Charles Dominique Joseph Bouligny. Grandson of Francisco Bouligny.
- Dionisio Botiller (1842–1915) – elected a member of the Los Angeles, California, Common Council, the governing body of the city. Botiller's Spanish-heritage family settled in California in the 18th century, living near Santa Barbara.
- Kate Brown – Democratic Governor of Oregon since 2015.
- Carlos Lopez-Cantera – Republican politician from Miami, who served in the Florida House of Representatives before being appointed the 19th Lieutenant Governor of Florida (2014–2018)
- Carlos Antonio Carrillo (1783–1852) – Governor of Alta California, (1837–1838)
- José Antonio Carrillo (1796–1862) – Californio ranchero, official and political. He was mayor of Los Angeles, California (1826, 1828, and 1833).
- Juan José Carrillo (1842–1916) – first mayor of Santa Monica, California
- Pedro Casanave (c.1766–1796) – Spanish merchant who became the Master Masonic and fifth mayor of Georgetown (modern Washington, D.C.). Casanave is particularly remembered for having buried the first stone in what later became the White House, on October 12, 1792.
- Ezequiel Cabeza De Baca (1864–1917) – first Hispano elected for office as Lieutenant Governor in New Mexico's first election. He was a descendant of the original Spanish settlers which later became part of the Baca Family of New Mexico.
- Dennis Chavez (1888–1962) – Democratic U.S. Senator from the State of New Mexico.
- Linda Chavez – father's family came to New Mexico from Spain in 1601.
- Henry Cisneros – politician and businessman
- Page Cortez (born 1961) – businessman from Lafayette, Louisiana, who is a Republican member of the Louisiana State Senate from District 23.
- José M. Covarrubias (c. 1809 – 1870) – Mayor of Santa Barbara, California, member of the California State Assembly
- Ted Cruz – U.S. Senator from Texas since 2013. His father is the Cuban son of a Spanish father from the Canary Islands
- Manuel Dominguez (1803–1882) – Mayor of Los Angeles (1832). He was of Spanish settlers descent.
- Albert Estopinal (1845–1919) – sugar cane planter from St. Bernard Parish, Louisiana, who served as a Democrat in both houses of the Louisiana State Legislature between 1876 and 1900, Lieutenant Governor of Louisiana between 1900 and 1904, and in the United States House of Representatives from Louisiana's 1st congressional district from 1908 until his death. His ancestors came from the Canary Islands, Spain.
- José Joaquín Estudillo (1800–1852) – second alcalde of Yerba Buena, California (the precursor to San Francisco), and whose land holdings, known as Rancho San Leandro, formed the basis of the city of San Leandro.
- Joachim Octave Fernández (1896–1978) – member of the U. S. House of Representatives representing the state of Louisiana. He was a Democrat.
- Fernando Ferrer – Borough President of The Bronx from 1987 to 2001, and was a candidate for Mayor of New York in 2001 and the Democratic Party nominee for Mayor in 2005
- Bill Flores (1954–) – member of the U. S. House of Representatives representing the state of Texas. He is a Republican.

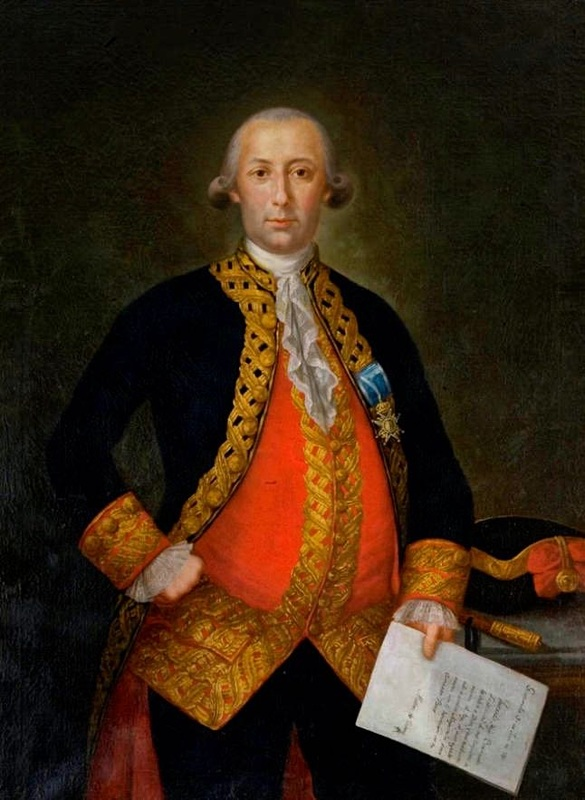
Portrait of Bernardo de Gálvez displayed at the United States Congress, by Mariano Salvador Maella

- Bernardo de Gálvez (1746–1786) – Spanish military leader and colonial administrator who served as colonial governor of Louisiana and Cuba, and later as Viceroy of New Spain. The US Senate passed, in December 2014, the granting of Honorary citizenship to Bernardo de Galvez, because he aided the American Thirteen Colonies in their quest for independence and led Spanish forces against Britain in the Revolutionary War.
- John Garamendi (born January 24, 1945) – Member of the U. S. House of Representatives representing the state of California. He is a Democrat.
- Charles Gayarré (1805–1895) – former Secretary of State of Louisiana, Louisiana state representative, and senator-elect from Louisiana.
- Antonio Maria de la Guerra (1825–1881) – Mayor of Santa Barbara, California, several times a member of the Santa Barbara County Board of Supervisors, California State Senator and Captain of California Volunteers in the American Civil War. He was son of Spanish soldier José de la Guerra y Noriega.
- José Gonzáles – American politician who served as first Mayor of Gonzales, Louisiana, between 1922/28 and 1932, and is considered the best mayor of that village.
- Joseph Marion Hernández (1793–1857) – American politician, plantation owner, and soldier. He was the first Delegate from the Florida Territory, becoming the first Hispanic American to serve in the United States Congress. His parents were Spanish settlers of St. Augustine in what was then East Florida.
- Santiago Iglesias (1872–1939), former Resident Commissioner of Puerto Rico (1933–1939)
- Alcée la Branche (1806–1861) – former senator from Louisiana, U.S. Chargé d'Affaires in Texas, and Louisiana state representative
- Ladislas Lazaro (1872–1927) – former U.S. representative from Louisiana and Louisiana state senator
- David Levy Yulee (1810–1886) – former senator and congressman-elect from Florida and delegate from the Florida Territory. Descended from Sephardic Jews expelled from Spain
- Vito Lopez – American politician, former member of the New York State Assembly.
- Manuel Lujan Jr – Republican Congressman from New Mexico & Secretary of Interior.
- Stephen Mallory II – former senator and congressman from Florida
- Francisco Antonio Manzanares (1843–1904) – businessman and politician.
- Luis H. Marrero (1847–1921) – chief of police in Jefferson Parish in New Orleans, president of parish's government between 1884 and 1916 and senator from Louisiana from 1892 to 1896. He was descend of Spanish settlers from Canary Island.

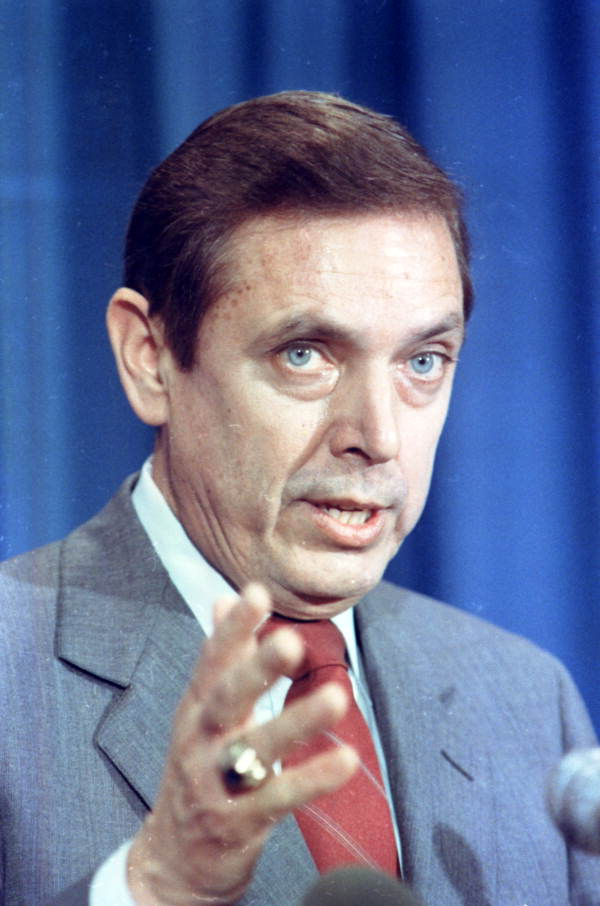
Bob Martinez, former Governor of Florida

- Bob Martinez – former and first Hispanic Governor of Florida, grandson of Spanish immigrants.
- Antonio Menchaca (1800–1879) – Mayor of San Antonio, Texas (1838–1839) y military who fought in the Texas Revolution. He was a Tejano whose parents were of Spanish descent. His great-great-grandfather was one of the founders and early settlers of Béxar.
- Joseph Montoya (1915–1978) – Democratic U.S. Senator from the State of New Mexico.
- Francisco Portusach Martínez (1864–1919) – Spanish merchant and whaler who was briefly the Governor of Guam, before he was deposed.
- Ramón Músquiz (1797–1867) – governor of Mexican Texas from 1830 to 1831 and 1835.
- Antonio Narbona (1773–1830) – Spanish soldier born in Mobile, now in Alabama, when this belonged to Spanish Louisiana. He was Governor of Santa Fe de Nuevo México between September 1825 and 1827 and he fought Native American people in the northern part of Mexico (now the southwestern United States) around the turn of the nineteenth century. He was of pure Spanish ancestry.
- Sammy Nunez – Louisiana politician of Canarian, or Isleño descent.
- Samuel B. Nunez, Jr. – politician and businessman from St. Bernard Parish, Louisiana. He is son of Sammy Nunez.
- Miguel Antonio Otero (1829–1882) – Spanish politician of the New Mexico Territory.
- Miguel Antonio Otero (1859–1944) – Governor of New Mexico Territory (1897–1906).
- Mariano S. Otero (1844–1904) – delegate from the Territory of New Mexico.
- Leander Perez (1891–1969) – Louisiana judge and politician of Isleño descent.
- Pío Pico (1801–1894) – last Governor of Alta California under Mexican rule. He was of Native American, Spanish and African mixed-race ancestry.
- Andrés Pico (1810–1876) – Californio rancher, military commander and was elected to the state assembly and senate after California became a state. Andrés Pico was the younger brother of Pío Pico
- Bill Richardson – American politician, who served as the 30th Governor of New Mexico from 2003 to 2011. His mother is the Mexican daughter of a Spanish father from Villaviciosa, Asturias (Spain) and a Mexican mother
- Henry "Junior" Rodríguez (1935–2018) – politician from St. Bernard Parish, Louisiana of Isleño descent.
- William E. Rodriguez (1879–1970) – American socialist politician and lawyer. He was the first Hispanic elected to the Chicago City Council. He was of Spaniard and German descent.
- Ken Salazar – 50th United States Secretary of the Interior, in the administration of President Barack Obama from 2009 to 2013. He is a descendant of Spanish settlers in New Spain in 16th century.
- José de la Cruz Sánchez (1799–1878) – eleventh Alcalde of San Francisco in 1845.
- Francisco Sanchez (1805–1862) was Commandante of the San Francisco Presidio and the eighth alcalde of San Francisco, California in 1843. He was brother of José de la Cruz Sánchez.
- Erasmo Seguín (1782–1857) – prominent citizen and politician in San Antonio, Texas. He was of French and Spanish descent in San Antonio de Bexar (now San Antonio, Texas).
- Juan Seguín (1806–1890) – Texas senator, mayor, judge, and justice of the peace and a prominent participant in the Texas Revolution. He was son of Erasmo Seguín.
- Mariano Guadalupe Vallejo (1807–1890) – Californio military commander, politician, and rancher.
- Juan Verde – political, business and social entrepreneur from the Canary Islands and adviser to President Obama and several Democratic political campaigns
- Agustín V. Zamorano (1798–1842) – printer, soldier, and provisional Mexican colonial Governor of Alta California. He was born in Florida, by which him obtained the American citizenship when the territory be joined to United States

=== Sheriffs, police, Texas Rangers and lawyers ===
- Eugene W. Biscailuz (1883–1969) – Sheriff of Los Angeles County. His mother was descended from old Spanish settlers of California.
- Tony Bouza (1928–2023) – 40-year veteran of municipal police, serving as Minneapolis police chief from 1980 to 1989. He was born in Spain
- Alex Ferrer (born 1960) – American television personality, lawyer, and retired judge who presides as the arbiter on Judge Alex.
- Manuel T. Gonzaullas (1891–1977) – Spanish born American Texas Rangers captain and a staff member of the Texas government.
- Alonzo Morphy (1798–1856) – American lawyer serving as Attorney General of Louisiana (1828–1830), and a Justice of the Louisiana Supreme Court (1839–1846). He was of Spanish, Portuguese and Irish descent.
- Rafael Piñeiro (born 1949) – Spanish-born American who served as First Deputy Commissioner of the New York City Police Department (NYPD).
- Manuel Real (1924–2019) – judge of the U.S. District Court for the Central District of California.
- Tomas Avila Sanchez (1826–1882) – American soldier, sheriff and public official, was on the Los Angeles County, California, Board of Supervisors and was a member of the Los Angeles Common Council, the legislative branch of the city. He was descendant of Spanish settlers.
- Michael G. Santos (born 1964) – American prison consultant, author of several books about prison, a professor of criminal justice, and an advocate for criminal justice reform. Santos is the son of a Cuban immigrant father and a mother of Spanish descent.
- Tony Serra (born 1934) – criminal defense and civil rights lawyer, political activist and tax resister from San Francisco.

=== Journalists and reporters ===
- Krystal Fernandez (born 1971) – American sports journalist.
- Bill Gallo (1922–2011) – cartoonist and newspaper columnist for the New York Daily News.
- Steve Lopez (born 1953) – American journalist who has been a columnist for The Los Angeles Times since 2001. He is the son of Spanish and Italian immigrants.
- Suzanne Malveaux (born 1966) – TV news reporter. She comes from a Creole family in Louisiana of French, Spanish and African origin.
- Craig Rivera (born 1954) – American television journalist, producer, and correspondent for Fox News Channel. His father was a Puerto Rican of Sephardic Jew descent.
- Sebastian Junger (born 1962) – American journalist, most famous for the best-selling book The Perfect Storm: A True Story of Men Against the Sea (1997)
- Geraldo Rivera (born 1943) – American lawyer, journalist, writer, reporter and talk show host. His father was of Puerto Rican Sephardic Jew ancestry. He is brother of Craig Rivera.
- Maria Rozman (born 1970) – Spanish-born Telemundo Washington, D.C.'s News Director.
- Rosana Ubanell (born 1958) – Spanish-born American naturalized news journalist and the first Spanish language novelist to ever be published by Penguin Books.

=== Novelists, poets and comic book cartoonists ===
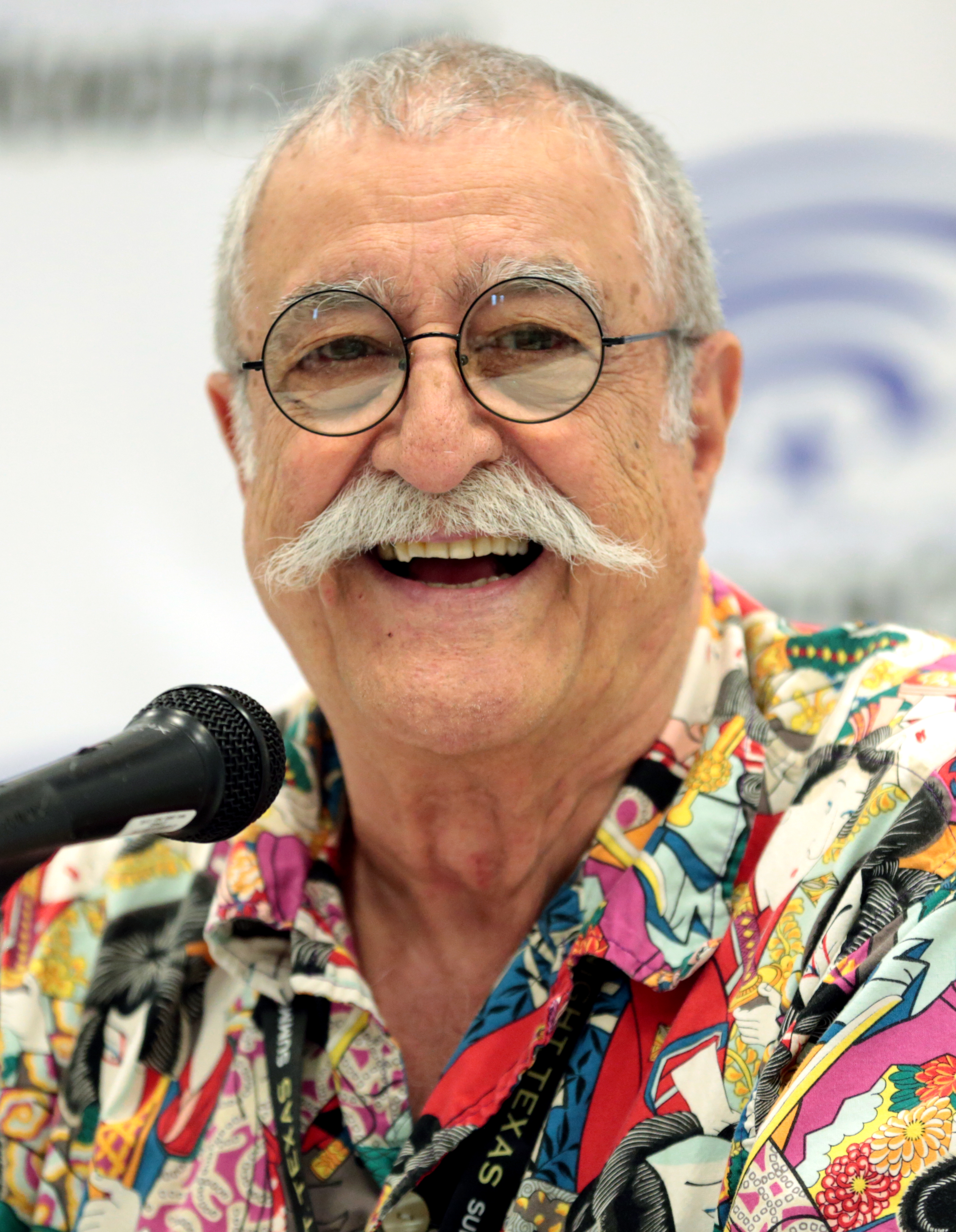
Cartoonist Sergio Aragonés

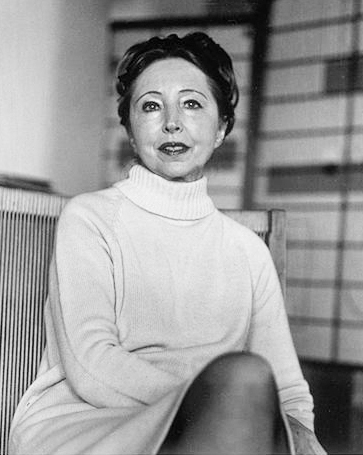
Writer Anaïs Nin

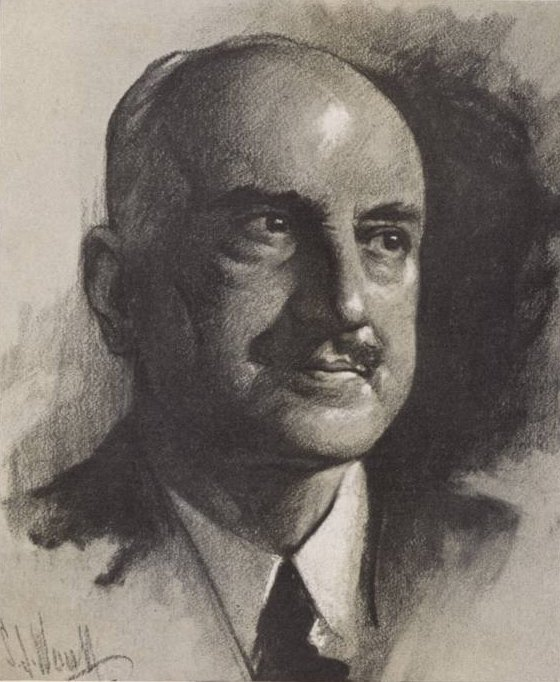
Philosopher George Santayana

- Alberto Acereda (born 1965) – writer, professor of Spanish language and literature in USA and Spanish author of numerous articles on politics and op-eds in several European and American newspapers.
- Mercedes de Acosta (1893–1968) – poet and playwright, also known for her lesbian affairs with Greta Garbo and Marlene Dietrich.
- Felipe Alfau (1902–1999) – Catalan novelist and poet.
- Jaime de Angulo (1887–1950) – linguist, novelist, and ethnomusicologist in the western United States. He was born in Paris of Spanish parents.
- Estelle Anna Lewis (1824–1880) – United States poet and dramatist. She was of English and Spanish descent.
- Sergio Aragonés (born 1937) – Spanish born-American cartoonist and writer known for his contributions to Mad Magazine and creator of the comic book Groo the Wanderer."
- José Argüelles (1939–2011) – American New Age author and artist. His father was Spanish.
- Ivan Argüelles (1939–2024) – American poet and brother of Jose Argüelles.
- Alexander Argüelles (born 1964) – American linguist and son of Ivan Argüelles.
- Hilario Barrero (born 1948) – Spanish poet and teacher.
- Stephen Vincent Benét (1898–1943) – American author, poet, short story writer, and novelist.
- Manuel Gonzales (1913–1993) – Spanish born-American Disney comics artist.
- Amber L. Hollibaugh (1946–2023) – American writer, film-maker and political activist. She is the daughter of a Romany father of Spanish descent and an Irish mother.
- Andrew Jolivétte – American author and lecturer of Spanish partially descent.
- Odón Betanzos Palacios (1925–2007) – poet, novelist and Spanish literary critic.
- Carmen M. Pursifull (1930–2015) – English-language free verse poet and former New York City Latin dance and Latin American music figure in the 1950s. She is of Puerto Rican and Spanish descent.
- Anaïs Nin (1903–1977) – born Angela Anaïs Juana Antolina Rosa Edelmira Nin y Culmell, was an American author born to Spanish-Cuban parents in France, where she was also raised.
- George Rabasa (born 1941) – American writer and author.
- Matthew Randazzo V (born 1984) – American true crime writer and historian. He is of Sicilian-American, Isleño, and Cajun descent.
- George Santayana (1863–1952) – Spanish-born philosopher, essayist, poet, and novelist.
- Jose Yglesias (1919–1995) – American novelist and journalist. Yglesias was born in the Ybor City section of Tampa, Florida, and was of Cuban and Spanish descent. His father was from Galicia.
- Rafael Yglesias (born 1954) – American novelist and screenwriter. His parents were the novelists Jose Yglesias and Helen Yglesias.

=== Ranchers and landowners ===
- José Antonio Aguirre (early Californian) (1799–1860) – merchant and rancher in Alta California.
- Arcadia Bandini de Stearns Baker (1825–1912) – wealthy Los Angeles Landowner. She was the granddaughter of the Spanish captain José María Estudillo.
- Eulogio F. de Celis (?–1903) – predominant landowner in the San Fernando Valley section of Los Angeles, California, in the mid-19th century. He was son of Spanish settlers.
- Eulalia Pérez de Guillén Mariné (1766?–1878) – Californio supercentenarian and owner of Rancho del Rincón de San Pascual (Southern California).
- Bernardo Yorba (1800–1858) – one of the most successful ranchers in Alta California, having thousands of cattle and horses grazing on land grants totaling more than 35,000 acres. He was the son of a Spanish soldier, José Antonio Yorba.

=== Religious figures ===
- Emilio S. Allué (1935–2020) – Spanish-born American prelate of the Roman Catholic Church.
- Joseph Sadoc Alemany (1814–1888) – Catalan-American Roman Catholic archbishop and missionary. He was naturalized in the United States in 1840.
- Eusebius J. Beltran (1934–2025) – American prelate. His father was Spanish.
- Francisco Mora y Borrell (1827–1905) – Catalan American Roman Catholic priest
- Thaddeus Amat y Brusi (1810–1878) – Roman Catholic Catalan cleric who eventually became Bishop of Los Angeles, California.
- Henriette DeLille (1813–1862) – founded the Catholic order of the Sisters of the Holy Family in New Orleans, which was composed of free women of color. Her mother was a Creole of color of French, Spanish and African ancestry and was born in New Orleans.
- Robert Fortune Sanchez (1934–2012) – Archbishop of the Roman Catholic Archdiocese of Santa Fe, New Mexico. Some of his ancestors were Spanish settlers in New Mexico.
- Josu Iriondo (born 1938) – Spanish born American prelate of the Roman Catholic Church. He served as an auxiliary bishop of the Archdiocese of New York from 2001 to 2014.
- Antonio José Martínez (1793–1867) – Nuevomexicano priest, educator, publisher, rancher, farmer, community leader, and politician.
- Ricky Rodriguez (1975–2005) – former member of the Children of God (COG), now known as The Family International (TFI).
- Alfredo Méndez-Gonzalez (1907–1995) – American Catholic bishop who served in Puerto Rico. He was of Spanish and Puerto Rican descent.
- José González Rubio (1804–1875) – Roman Catholic friar prominent in the early history of California.
- Peter Morales – President of the Unitarian Universalist Association, elected in 2009. Morales is the first Latino president. He is of Mexican and Spanish descent.
- David Arias Pérez – Spanish-born Recollect friar in the United States.
- Peter Verdaguer y Prat (1835–1911) – Catalan-born American prelate of the Roman Catholic Church.
- Francisco González Valer – Spanish-born American prelate of the Roman Catholic Church.

=== Scholars, professors and academics ===
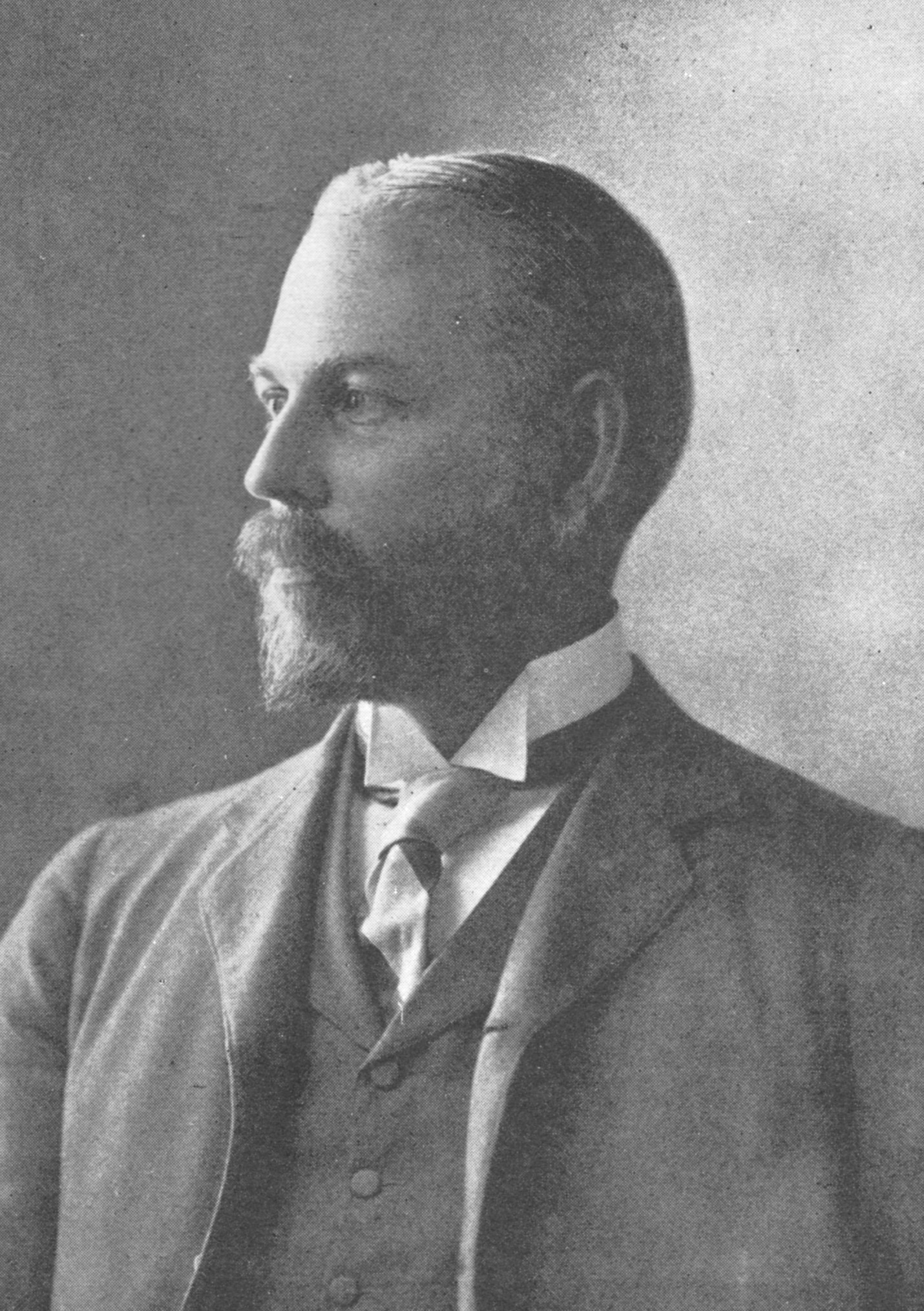
Art historian Ernest Fenollosa

- Gloria Anzaldúa (1942–2004) – scholar of Chicana cultural theory, feminist theory, and queer theory. She was a descendant of many of the prominent Basque and Spanish explorers and settlers who came to the Americas in the 16th and 17th centuries and also had indigenous ancestry.
- Ángel Cabrera (born 1967) – Spanish-born American academic and sixth President of George Mason University.
- Larrie Ferreiro (born 1958) – American historian to a Spanish great-grandfather.
- Ernest Fenollosa (1853–1908) – American professor of philosophy and political economy at Tokyo Imperial University and art historian of Japanese art. His father is from Málaga, Spain
- Frank Micheal Fernández, Jr. (1918–2001) – notable Isleño educator, historian, and community leader in St. Bernard Parish.
- Jorge Ferrer (born 1968) – chair of the department of East-West Psychology at the California Institute of Integral Studies.
- Karl Hess (1923–1994) – American speechwriter and author. He was of German and Spanish descent.
- Juan José Linz (1926–2013) – Spanish sociologist and political scientist. He was of German father and Spanish mother.
- Andrew Jolivétte – American author and lecturer who is employed at San Francisco State University as an associate professor in American Indian Studies and an instructor in Ethnic Studies, Educational Leadership, and Race and Resistance Studies.
- Xavier Sala-i-Martin (born 1962) – Catalan-born American professor of economics at Columbia University.
- Carlos Fernández-Pello – Spanish-born faculty member of the University of California, Berkeley, Department of Mechanical Engineering.
- Juan Bautista Rael (1900–1993) – Nuevomexicano ethnographer, linguist, and folklorist who was a pioneer in the study of the Nuevomexicanos, his stories and his language, both from Northern New Mexico and Southern Colorado.

=== Scientists, inventors and engineers ===
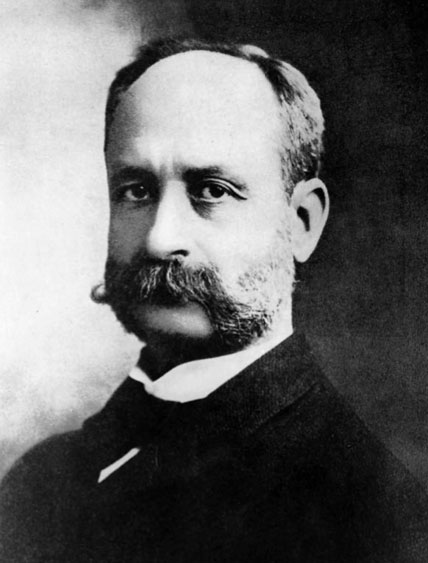
Building engineer Rafael Guastavino

- Luis F. Álvarez (1853–1937) – Spanish-born American doctor. He developed diagnosis for macular leprosy
- Luis W. Alvarez (1911–1988) – American scientist of Spanish descent. He was a Nobel Prize-winning physicist and key participant in the Manhattan Project
- Walter Alvarez (born 1940) – American geologist of Spanish descent who first proposed the asteroid-impact theory to explain the extinction of the dinosaurs
- Walter C. Alvarez (1884–1978) – American doctor of Spanish descent. He authored several dozen books on medicine, and wrote introductions and forewords for many others. Referred to as "America's Family Doctor" for his syndicated medical column in hundreds of newspapers.
- Francisco J. Ayala (1934–2023) – Spanish-born American biologist and philosopher, recipient of the 2010 Templeton Prize
- Isador Coriat (1875–1943) – American psychiatrist and neurologist. He was one of the first American psychoanalysts. He was of Moroccan-Spanish descent on father's side and German on mother's side.
- Pedro Cuatrecasas (1936–2025) – Spanish-born American biochemist and an adjunct professor of Pharmacology & Medicine at the University of California, San Diego
- Valentín Fuster (born 1943) – Catalan-born American cardiologist
- Rafael Guastavino (1842–1908) – Spanish-born building engineer and builder who lived in the United States since 1881 until his death; his career was based in New York City. The vaults of hundreds buildings in the eastern US were built based on his design.
- Rodolfo Llinás (born 1934) – Professor of Neuroscience and Chairman of the department of Physiology & Neuroscience at the NYU School of Medicine. Born in Bogotá (Colombia), with Spanish grandfather.
- Michael Lopez-Alegria (born 1958) – Spanish-born American astronaut. Holds American record for most EVA hours (spacewalks or moonwalks). Born in Madrid.
- Miguel A. Sanchez – Spanish-born American board-certified pathologist who specializes in anatomic pathology, clinical pathology and cytopathology.
- Severo Ochoa (1905–1993) – Spanish-born Nobel Prize-winning biochemist who worked on the synthesis of RNA
- Ramón Verea (1833–1899) – Spanish-born journalist, engineer and writer. Inventor of a calculator with an internal multiplication table

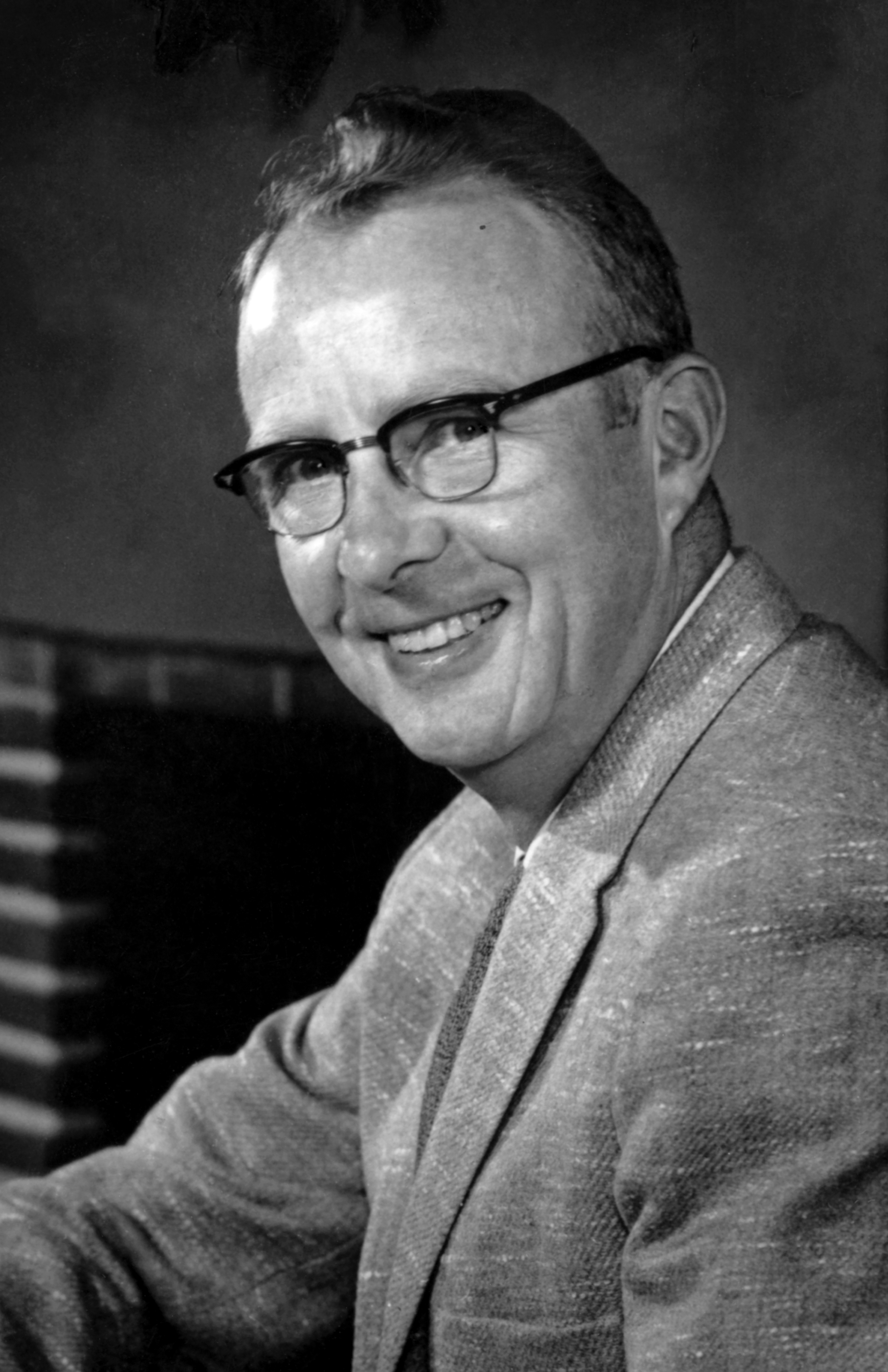
Particle physicist Luis W. Alvarez

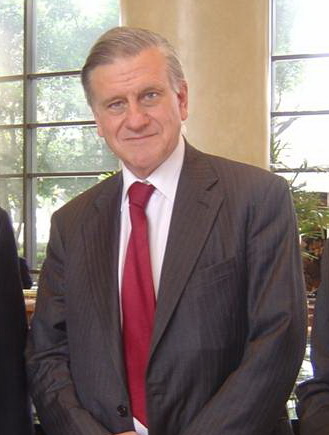
Cardiologist Valentín Fuster

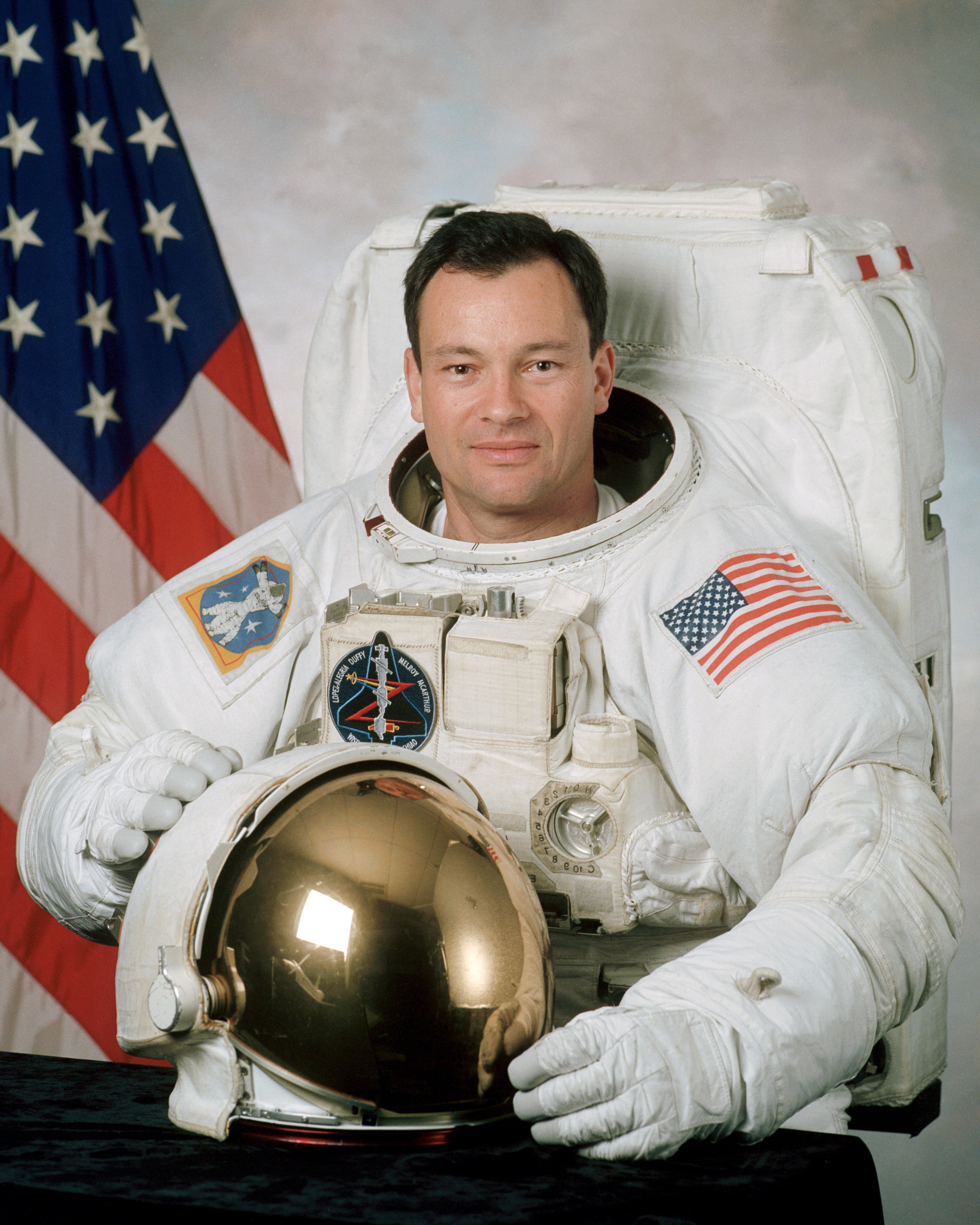
Astronaut Michael Lopez-Alegria

=== Philanthropists, activists, revolutionaries, and community leaders ===
- Helene Hagan (born 1939) – Moroccan-born American anthropologist and Amazigh activist. She is of Berber and Catalan descent.
- Yasmin Aga Khan (born 1949) – philanthropist with Spanish blood from her mother, Rita Hayworth.
- Juan Bautista Mariano Picornell y Gomila (1759–1825) – Spanish-born revolutionary.
- Concepción Picciotto (1936–2016) – also known as Conchita or Connie, Spanish-born American who had lived in Lafayette Square, Washington, D.C., on the 1600 block of Pennsylvania Avenue, in a peace camp across from the White House, since August 1, 1981, in protest of nuclear arms
- Alberto Rivera (1935–1997) – Canarian-born American anti-Catholic religious activist who was the source of many of fundamentalist Christian author Jack Chick's conspiracy theories about The Vatican.
- Tony Serra (born 1934) – American civil rights lawyer, activist and tax resister from San Francisco.
- Andrea Heinemann Simon (1909–1994) – community leader and the mother of award-winning singer, Carly Simon. She is of Spanish-Swiss descent.

=== Others ===
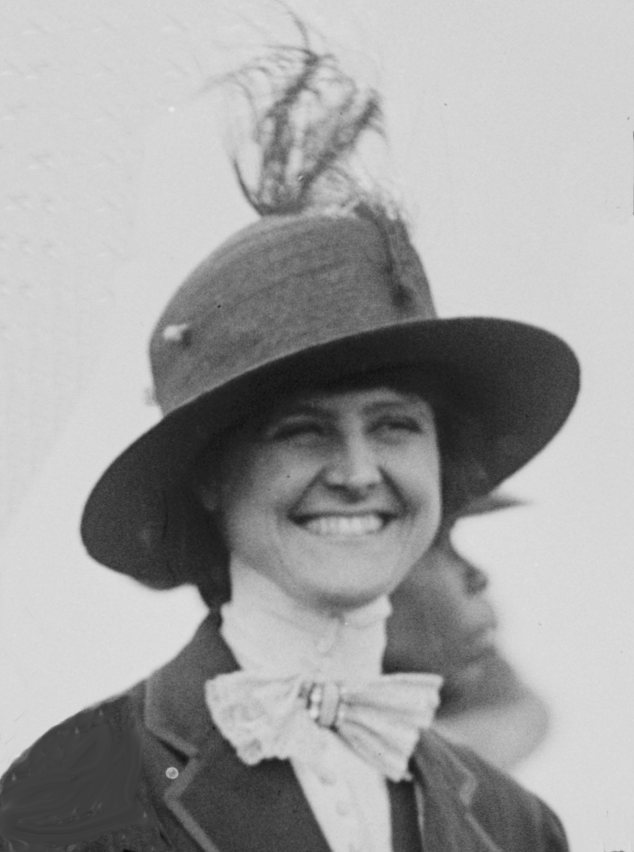
Socialite Aida de Acosta

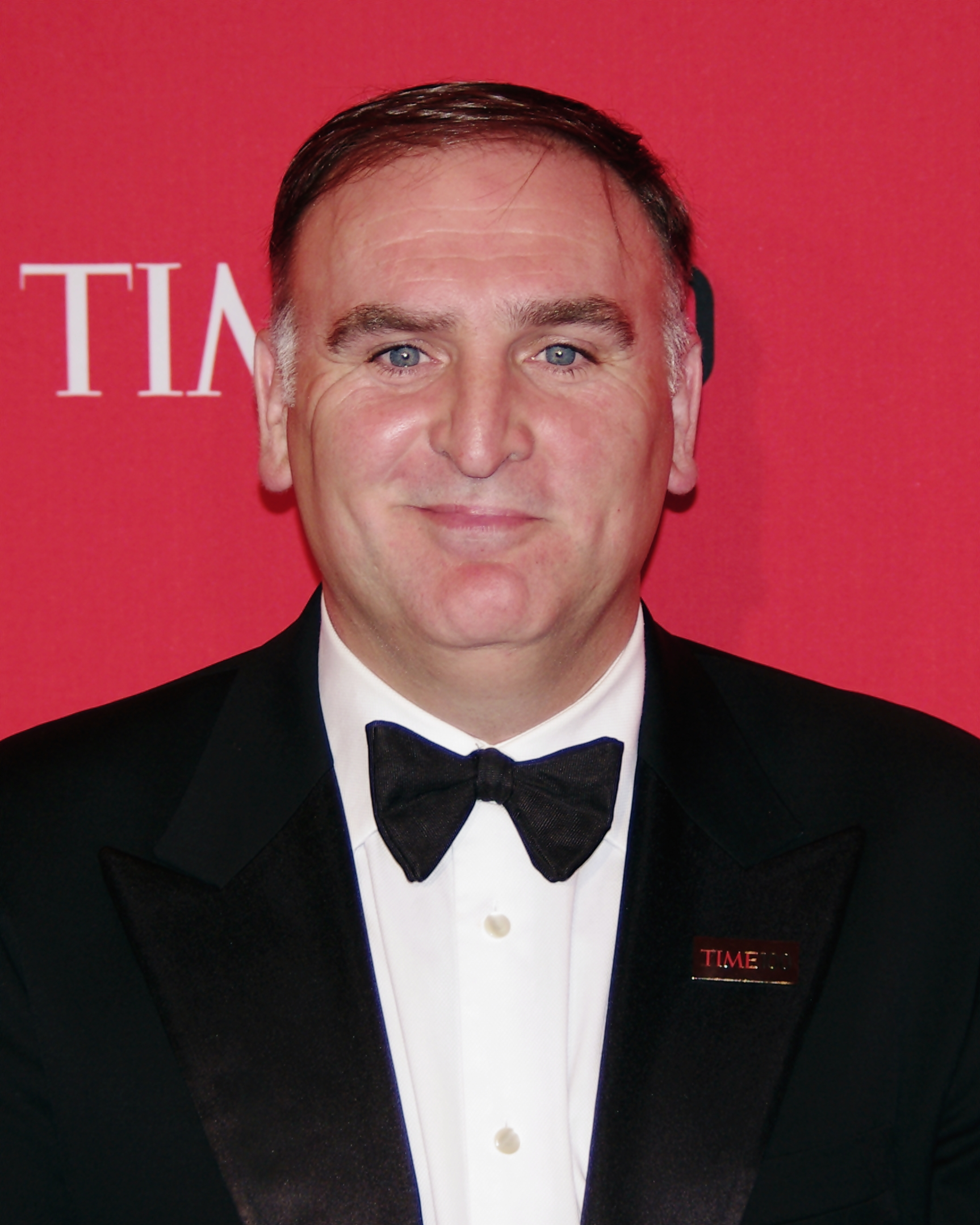
Chef José Andrés

- Aida de Acosta (1884–1962) – socialite and first woman to fly a plane solo motor.
- José Andrés (born 1969) – Spanish-born American naturalized chef.
- Concepción Argüello (1791–1857) – Alta Californian noted for her romance with Nikolai Rezanov, a Russian promoter of the colonization of Alaska and California. She was the daughter of José Darío Argüello, the Spanish governor of Alta California and Presidio Commandante.
- Alfonso Calderón (born 2001) – Spanish-American activist against gun violence and survivor of the Stoneman Douglas High School shooting
- John Henry Carpenter (1928–1998) – most widely known as the friend and accused murderer of actor Bob Crane in 1978. He was of Native American and Spanish heritage.
- Raymond Fernandez (1914–1951) – and his common-law wife Martha Beck became known as The Lonely Hearts Killers.
- Manuel A. Gonzalez (1832–1902) – 19th-century Spanish steamship captain and was one of the first permanent settlers of Fort Myers, Florida. He became a naturalized U.S. Citizen in May 1859, in Key West, Florida.
- Perez Hilton (born 1978) – American blogger and television personality.
- Rita de Acosta Lydig (1875–1929) – socialite. She was considered "the most picturesque woman in America".
- Paul Charles Morphy (1837–1884) – American chess player.
- Tony Pastor (1837–1908) – American impresario. His father was a Spanish immigrant.
- Ignacio Peralta (1791–1874) – Spanish settler in California and son of Spanish soldier Luís María Peralta.
- Kika Perez, aka Ilva Margarita Perez – Colombian American actress/TV host of Spanish descent.
- Augusto Perez (born 1972) – retired Spanish-born American wheelchair curler.
- Manuel Torres (1762–1822) – Spanish-born American publicist and diplomat. He was the first ambassador of Colombia between June 19, 1822, and July 15, 1822
- JWoww (born 1985) – American television personality, of Spanish-Irish descent.

== See also ==
- Criollos
- Catalan American
- Galician American
- Basque-American
- Canarian American (Isleños in Louisiana)
- Hispanic American
- List of Puerto Ricans
- Californio
- Neomexicano
- Tejano
- List of Hispanos
- Spanish Filipinos
- Spanish Argentine
- Spanish Mexicans
