= Rosana Ubanell =

Spanish-American writer and journalist (born 1958)

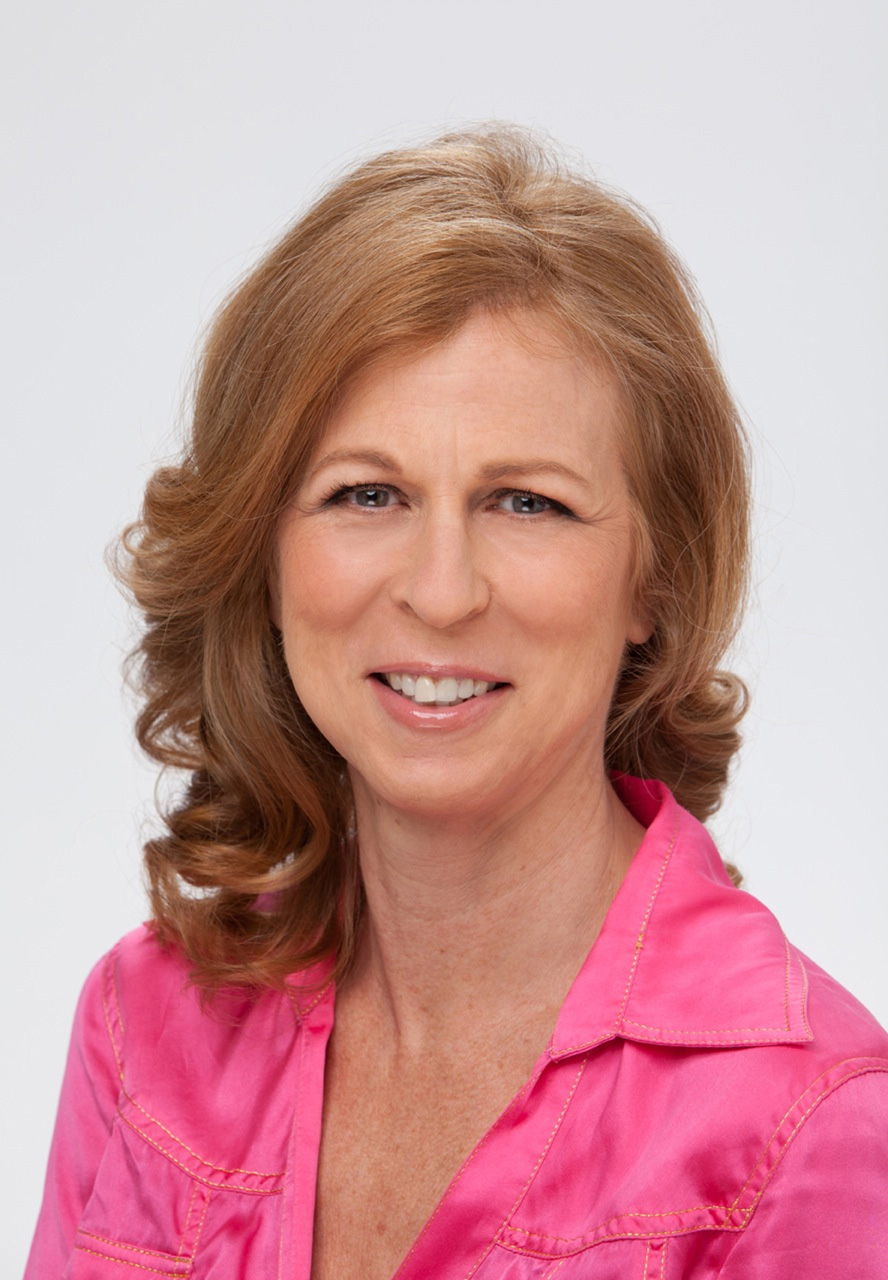
- Born: 20 June 1958; Pamplona, Spain
- Education: University of Navarra (BA) George Mason University (MBA)
- Occupations: Journalist and novelist
- Writing career
- Genre: Mystery novels

Rosana Ubanell (born 1958 in Pamplona, Spain), is a Spanish-American news journalist and the first Spanish language novelist published by Penguin Books.

== Career ==
=== Journalism ===
Ubanell is a graduate of the University of Navarra, where she received an undergraduate degree in journalism, and George Mason University, where she received an MBA in International Transactions. After graduating, she worked as a correspondent for a number of Spanish publications, including the magazine Tiempo de Hoy where she worked as the Brussels correspondent from 1986 to 1990. She eventually became the Director of the Department of Communications at the Confederación Española de Organizaciones Empresariales in Brussels.

In 1990, she moved to Washington, D.C., where she worked as correspondent for the magazine Tribuna de la Actualidad. In 2002, she then moved to Miami to become the Assignment Editor of American Airlines' Spanish-language magazine Nexos.

=== Books ===
In 2011, she released her first novel Volver a Morir, a Spanish-language detective novel based in the city of Miami. Critics liked the book's representation of the crossing between cultural boundaries by placing a Hispanic protagonist (Nelson Montero) in the central role of an American-based mystery. It was also the first Spanish-language novel published by the publishing company Penguin Books. Penguin wad slated to publish the second installment of Ubanell's Nelson Montero detective series.

In 2012, she released her second novel Perdido en tu piel, described by Fox News Latino as telling, "the story of two lovers who meet again after 30 years without any news of each other and mixes that 'unique first love, without barriers' with a story of suspense and secrets that takes place, among other locations, in New York, Marbella and Mexico." Ubanell also stated in 2013 that she had two more Nelson Montero books in the works in order to continue the series debuted with her first novel. When asked why she turned to a romantic novel for the storyline of her second book she stated: "So much is said about love but we still don’t know what it is. I wanted to explore it, to delve into that universal emotion the Greeks used to call 'the madness of the gods' because of its effects, very similar to the effects of inebriation and drugs."
