= Miguel A. Sanchez =

Spanish-American pathologist

Miguel Sanchez
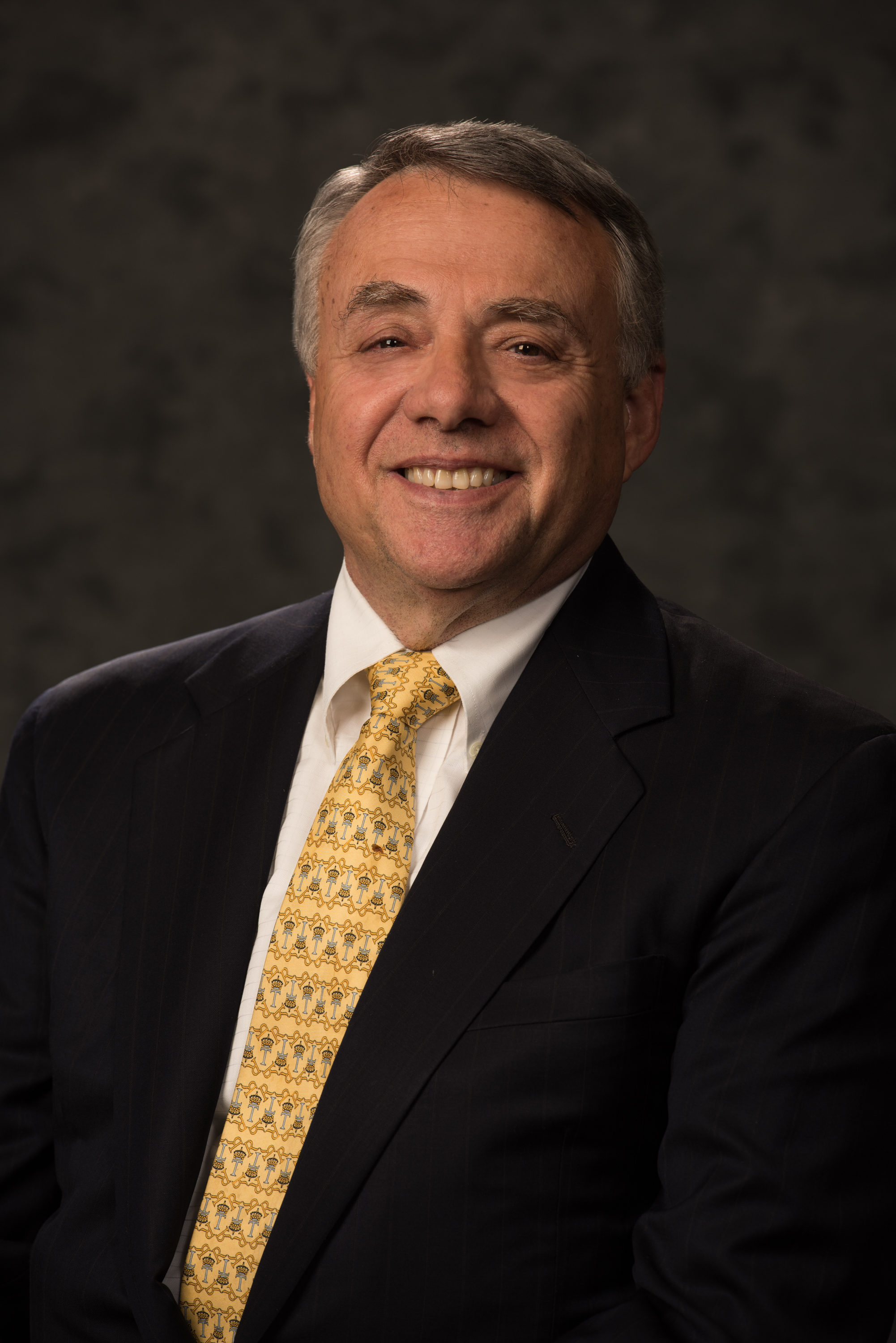
- Born: Madrid, Spain
- Education: Complutense University of Madrid
- Occupations: Physician, pathologist
- Years active: 1969-present
- Known for: Work in pathology, cytopathology, breast cancer.
- Website: official page

Miguel A. Sanchez is a board-certified pathologist who specializes in anatomic pathology, clinical pathology, and cytopathology. Sanchez is chief of pathology and medical director of The Leslie Simon Breast Care and Cytodiagnosis Center at Englewood Hospital and Medical Center in Englewood, New Jersey. He is best known for his contribution in setting the standards of diagnosis and treatment of breast and thyroid disease praised by the United States Congress in 1994.

== Education ==
Sanchez received his medical degree from the Complutense University of Madrid in 1969. Following a short period of practice in internal medicine and cardiology, he emigrated to the United States to complete a training in pathology at Temple University in Philadelphia and at the Memorial Sloan Kettering Cancer Center and St. Vincent's Hospital in Manhattan, New York City. Then, he received training in fine-needle aspiration biopsy at the Karolinska University Hospital in Sweden in the 1980s.

== Medical career ==
Sanchez has practiced at Englewood Hospital and Medical Center since 1975, as its chief of pathology since 1991, and a member of its board of trusteesfrom 1985 to 2014. Sanchez holds professorial appointments at both Icahn School of Medicine at Mount Sinai (1990–Present) and New York University. He lectured on the intersection of medicine with the humanities such as music, opera and egyptology. As a result, he has been a member of the Paleopathology Club of the International Academy of Pathology and the Paleopathology Society. He has given national and international lectures and talks on breast cancer and the role of the humanities in learning medicine and ancient Egyptian medicine He is a member of the University of Memphis team excavating Thebes Tomb 16 (TT16) in Luxor, Egypt .

== Publications ==
- "Prosthesis for the Afterlife in TT16, Luxor, Egypt". Journal of the American Research Center in Egypt. Vol.50, No.1, January 2014.
- "Cytologic Findings of Atypical Adenosis of the Breast". Acta Cytologica. Vol.46, No.2, 2002.
- "Current issues in breast cytopathology". American Journal of Clinical Pathology. Vol.113, No.5, 2000.
- "Analysis of DNA distribution in Kaposi's sarcoma in patients with and without the acquired immune deficiency syndrome". Vol.10, No.1, 1988.
- "Fine-needle aspiration of the breast". Pathology (Philadelphia, Pa.) Vol.4, No.2, 1996.

== Awards and honors ==
Sanchez has received several national and international awards and distinctions during his career. The most notable of his distinctions are the first Yolanda Oertel Interventional Pathologist of the Year in 2003; the gold medal of the Chinese Academy of Medical Science for his contributions in the first course on AIDS in Beijing. The President of Nicaragua granted him the Medal of Medical Merit and the College of American Pathologists honored him with the 2010 Excellence in Education Award.

- Gold medal of the Chinese Academy of Medical Sciences, 1987.
- Zonta International Award for Breast Cancer Care, October 10, 1995.
- American Cancer Society Award, March 1997.
- Susan G. Komen Foundation Honoree, Annual Pink Tie Ball, 2004.
- Nicaraguan Medal of Medical Merit, 2004.
- The Papanicolaou Society of Cytopathology, Yolanda Oertel Interventional Cytopathologist Award, February 2005.
- The Kennedy Funding Invitational.
- Excellence in Education Award from the College of American Pathologists (CAP), June 2010.
- Top doctors for women's health (1st to 14th editions).
- Newsweek Health: Top Cancer Doctors.
- New York Best Doctors.
