= Craig Rivera =

American television journalist

- Born: October 10, 1954 (age 71); New York City, U.S.
- Occupations: Television personality; journalist
- Spouse: Cordelia Bowe (m. 1992)
- Children: 2
- Relatives: Geraldo Rivera (brother)

Craig Rivera (born October 10, 1954) is an American television journalist, producer, and correspondent for Fox News Channel. He also appeared regularly on the Fox News Channel newsmagazine program Geraldo at Large.

== Early life ==
Craig Rivera was born in Manhattan on October 10, 1954. He is the youngest child of Lillian (née Friedman), a waitress, and Cruz "Allen" Rivera (October 1, 1915 – November 1987), a restaurant worker and cab driver. Rivera's father was a Catholic Puerto Rican, and his mother was of Ashkenazi Russian Jewish descent. He grew up in Brooklyn and West Babylon, New York where he attended West Babylon High School. He has four siblings: Irene, Geraldo, Wilfredo, and Sharon.

== Career ==
He attended Kutztown University and majored in Communications and Media studies. After graduating, he joined ABC's 20/20 in 1978 as a Producer. He transitioned to Inside Edition in 1986, working for the first time as an on-air talent.

He then left Inside Edition to, along with his brother, join Fox News Channel in light of the 9/11 attacks to cover American combat in the Afghanistan and Iraq Wars. Four years into his career at Fox, he became a Senior Field Producer for Geraldo at Large and appeared each week on the show to present an investigative reporting segment called “Craig Investigates”.

== Recognitions ==
A year before he left Inside Edition, he worked on an investigative segment titled “Home Depot Dangers”, which won a Deadline Club Award for Best Series/Investigative Reporting.
