= Craig Torres (bodybuilder) =

American bodybuilder (born 1970)

- Professional bodybuilder

Personal info
- Born: May 31, 1970 (age 55)

Best statistics

Craig Anthony Torres (born May 31, 1970), is a professional bodybuilder of Italian and Spanish origin. He has competed in both the NPC and IFBB.

== Competitions and titles ==
- 2010 NPC Masters Nationals, Light-Heavyweight—Did Not Place
- 2009 NPC USA Championships, Light-Heavyweight—Did Not Place
- 2009 NPC Excalibur Los Angeles, Light-Heavyweight—4th
- 2008 NPC New England Championships, Middleweight—2nd
- 2008 NPC Nationals, Light-Heavyweight—Did Not Place
- 2007 NABBA USA Nationals, Short—2nd
- 2007 NPC Team Universe Championships, Middleweight—10th
- 2007 NPC Nationals, Middleweight—Did Not Place
- 2007 NPC Massachusetts Championships, Middleweight—1st
- 2005 IFBB North American Championships, Light-Heavyweight—8th
- 2005 NPC Massachusetts Championships, Overall Winner
- 2005 NPC Massachusetts Championships, Light-Heavyweight—1st
- 2004 NPC Nationals, Light-Heavyweight—10th
- 2004 NPC Excalibur Los Angeles, Light-Heavyweight—2nd
- 2003 NPC New England Championships, Overall Winner
- 2003 NPC New England Championships, Light-Heavyweight—1st
- 2003 NPC Nationals, Light-Heavyweight—11th
- 2003 NPC Junior Nationals, Light-Heavyweight—7th
- 2002 NPC USA Championships, Light-Heavyweight—11th
- 2001 NPC Nationals, Middleweight—9th
- 2000 NPC New England Championships, Middleweight—1st
- 2000 NPC Nationals, Middleweight—11th
- 2000 NPC Massachusetts Championships, Middleweight—3rd
- 1999 NPC Nationals, Middleweight—14th
- 1999 NPC Massachusetts Championships, Middleweight—2nd
- 1998 NPC New England Championships, Middleweight—11th
- 1997 NPC New England Championships, Middleweight—5th
- 1994 NPC Team Universe Championships, Middleweight—12th
- 1993 NPC Massachusetts Championships, Middleweight—1st
- 1992 ANBC USA Natural Championships, Junior—4th

== See also ==
- List of male professional bodybuilders
