= Eva Camacho-Sánchez =

American fashion designer

- Occupation(s): Jewelry, housewares, and accessories maker

Eva Camacho-Sánchez is an American textile artist and educator based in Northampton, Massachusetts. She creates felted decorations, jewelry, housewares, and accessories at her company Lana Handmade. Much of her work is inspired by nature.

== Life ==
She grew up in Alcaudete, Spain. She earned a bachelor's degree in educational sciences at the University of Córdoba.

After moving to California in 1998, Camacho-Sanchez began working as a Spanish teacher. She continued to teach Spanish when she moved to Washington D.C. in 2000. She attended George Washington University, where she earned a master's degree in translation and interpretation. She then became a certified translator and interpreter.

In Massachusetts, Camacho-Sanchez has worked for the International Language Institute of Massachusetts since 2021 and Williston Northampton School since 2022.

== Felting ==
Camacho-Sanchez became a textile artist after moving to Northampton, Massachusetts in 2010.

She sources wool from New England farmers and incorporates material from the woods into some of her work.

Camacho-Sánchez lays out pieces of wool on a large table, wets them with water and soap, then rolls the wool in a piece of bubble wrap about 1,000 times to form it. She uses the prepared felt to make garments in about six or seven hours.

=== Selected exhibitions ===
- "Soft Borders" (2019), Surface Design Association
- "Human Impact: Stories of the Opioid Epidemic" (2020), Fuller Craft Museum, Brockton, Massachusetts

== Personal life ==
Camacho-Sanchez is married and has three children.
