= List of Hispanos =

This is a list of Hispanos, both settlers and their descendants (either fully or partially of such origin), who were born or settled, between the early 16th century and 1850, in what is now the southwestern United States (including California, Arizona, New Mexico, Texas, southwestern Colorado, Utah and Nevada), as well as Florida, Louisiana (1763–1800) and other Spanish colonies in what is now the United States. Governors and explorers, who spent time in these places serving the Spanish crown but never settled in them as colonists, are not included, although they also helped shape the history of the present United States. This list shows notable people of Spanish and Mexican origin who lived in the Hispanic colonies now part of the United States, as well as their descendants.

== Spanish and Mexican era ==
These are persons who were born and/or lived, and died, in the Spanish or Mexican territories that later were incorporated in the United States. They were never Americans in the sense of persons born, raised or naturalized in the modern United States.

- Santiago Abreú (died 8 August 1837) governor of Santa Fe de Nuevo México from 1832 to 1833
- Nicolás de Aguilar (1627–c. 1666) Spanish official in New Mexico.
- Rosario E. Aguilar (c. 1792–1847) Early settler in San Diego, California.
- Andrés Almonaster y Rojas (1724 Mairena del Alcor, Spain – 1798 New Orleans) A Spanish civil servant of New Orleans, today chiefly remembered for his numerous charitable benefactions to the city.
- Pedro de Alberni (born Tortosa, Spain, January 30, 1747–died Monterrey, New Spain, March 11, 1802) Spanish soldier and Governor of Alta California.
- José Darío Argüello (1753–1828), Spanish soldier, California pioneer, founder of Los Angeles and twice a Spanish colonial governor.
- Luis Antonio Argüello (1784-1830) Governor of Alta California
- Gaspar Flores de Abrego (1781–1836) Tejano who served five terms as the mayor of San Antonio, Texas. He was also a land commissioner and associate of Austin's early colonists.
- Martín de Argüelles (born 1566) First white child (criollo) known to have been born in what is now the United States. His birthplace was St. Augustine, Florida.
- Ignacio Lorenzo de Armas (1706–after 1764) Spanish politician who served as mayor of San Antonio, Texas, in 1738 and 1764.
- Simón de Arocha (1731–1796) Judge presiding over the distribution of public lands and mayor of San Antonio de Béjar (1770 and 1787).
- Bartolomé Baca (c. 1767 – 1834) Governor of Santa Fe de Nuevo México
- Rosa María Hinojosa de Ballí (1752–1803) was a rancher known as the first "cattle queen" of Texas
- Diego de Borica, a Basque Spanish explorer and the seventh governor of Las Californias from 1794 to 1800.
- Francisco Bouligny (1736–1800) A Spanish high-ranking military and civilian officer in Spanish Louisiana; he served as lieutenant governor under Bernardo de Gálvez and as acting military governor in 1799. Founded the city of New Iberia in 1779.
- María Ygnacia López de Carrillo (1793-1849) Californio ranchera and founder of Santa Rosa.
- José Raimundo Carrillo (1749–1809) Early Hispanic settler of San Diego, California and founder of the Carrillo family in Spanish California.
- Guillermo Castro (soldier) (b. 1810 d. ?) Californio soldier and rancher
- Francisco Xavier Chávez - (1768-1838) Governor of Mexican New Mexico in 1822.
- Antonio Valverde y Cosío (1670–1728) was a prominent entrepreneur and Spanish soldier who served as acting governor of Santa Fe de Nuevo México in 1716 and as interim governor of this territory from 1718 to 1721.
- Juan Curbelo (Tejano settler) (1680–1760) Spanish politician who served as mayor of San Antonio, Texas, in 1737 and 1739.
- Narciso Durán (December 16, 1776, Empúries, Catalonia, Spain–June 4, 1846, Santa Barbara, Alta California, Mexico) Franciscan friar and missionary.
- Juan José Elguézabal (1781–1840) Military personnel and Presidios attached inspector who served as interim governor of Texas between 1834 and 1835.
- José María Estudillo (died April 8, 1830) Early settler of San Diego, California and a governing official during San Diego's Mexican period.
- Blas María de la Garza Falcón (1712–1767) Spanish settler of Tamaulipas and South Texas.
- José Vicente Féliz (1741–1822), member of the 1775-76 Anza expedition that brought the first settlers to California.
- José Figueroa (179?–September 1835) General and the Mexican territorial governor of Alta California from 1833 to 1835.

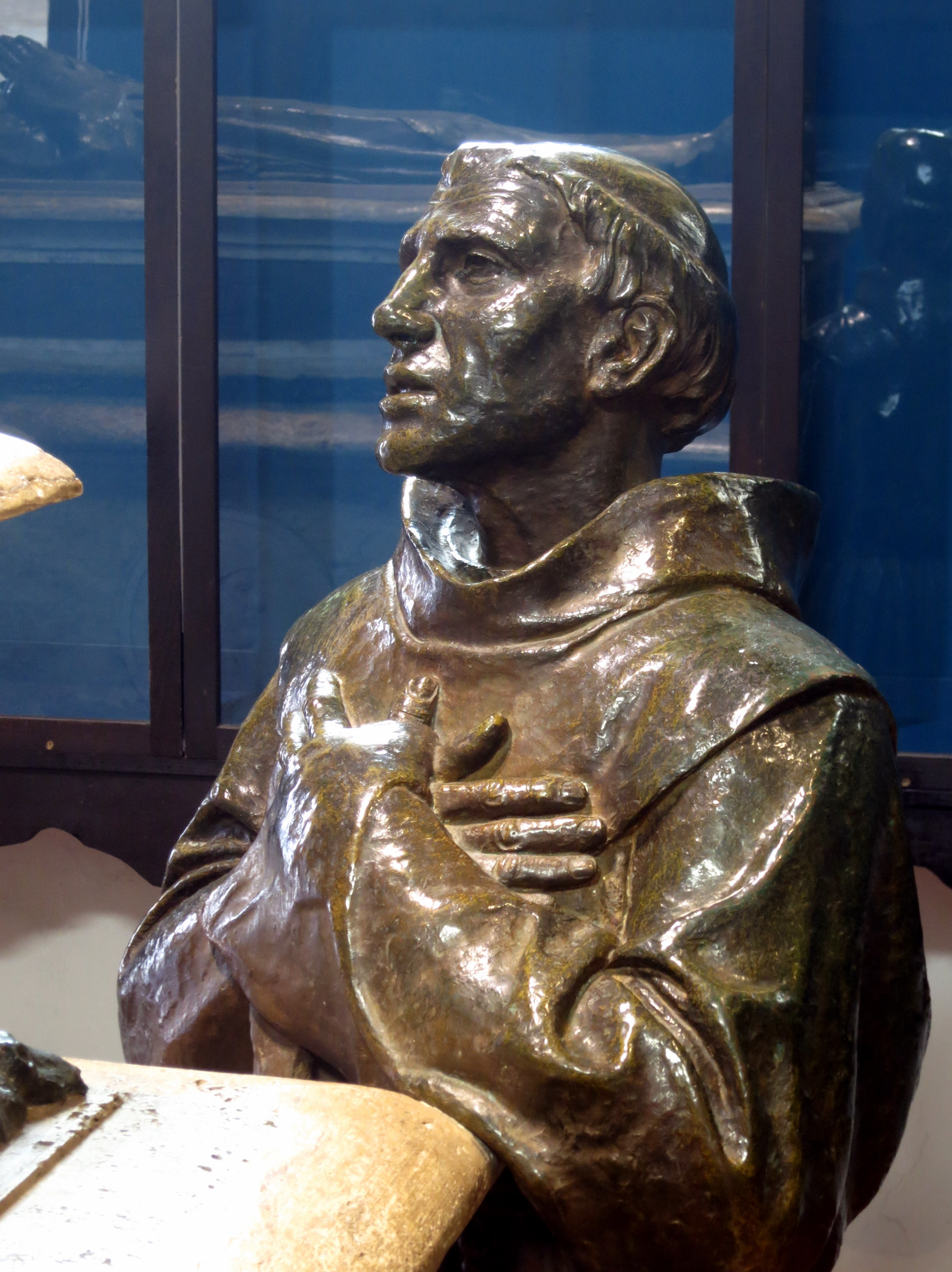
Friar Fermín Lasuén

- Hernando de Escalante Fontaneda (c. 1536 – after 1575) Spanish shipwreck survivor who lived among the Indians of Florida for 17 years.
- Francisco de Haro (1792–November 28, 1849) First Alcalde (Mayor) of Yerba Buena (later named San Francisco) in 1834.
- Pedro Benedit Horruytiner (1613–November 20, 1684) Spanish soldier and settler resident in St. Augustine, Florida, who served as the Acting Governor and accountant of Florida between 1646 and 1648.
- Juan Páez Hurtado (1668 – 1742) Spanish official who served as Captain General, Governor and Mayor of Santa Fe de Nuevo Mexico.
- Damacio Jiménez Tejano soldier who served in the Mexican army during the Battle of the Alamo
- Fermín Lasuén (June 7, 1736, Vitoria, Spain–June 26, 1803, Mission San Carlos Borroméo de Carmelo) Basque Spanish missionary to Alta California, the second president and founder of the California Franciscan mission chain.
- Juan Leal (1676–1742 or 1743) First Mayor of San Antonio, Texas
- Nicolás Ponce de León II Acting governor of Spanish Florida from 1663 to 1664, and from 1673 to 1675. He was born in Saint Augustine, Florida.
- Juan Domínguez de Mendoza (1631 - ?) - Spanish soldier and member of the Novomexicana elite.
- Gabriel Moraga (1765–June 14, 1823) Spanish army officer in the Viceroyalty of New Spain, an explorer of Alta California.
- Antonio Rodríguez Medero (1712–April 10, 1760) Mayor of San Antonio, Texas, in 1741. He was one of the first settlers of San Antonio and laid the foundation for the creation of the first inheritable water supply sources (a concept perhaps first developed in the Canary Islands) in America. He was also the architect of the Espada Acequia, consisting of an aqueduct and seven gravity-flow canals to irrigate the lands of the Canarian settlers in San Antonio.
- Manuel Nieto (1734–1804) Soldier from the Presidio of San Diego.
- Antonio de Olivares (1630–1722) a Spanish Franciscan known for officiating at the first Mass celebrated in Texas, and for his exploration of the area where the city was founded.
- Bernardo de Miera y Pacheco (born August 4, 1713 or 1714–died April 11, 1785) Cartographer, as well as an artist, particularly as a Santero (wood-carver of religious images).
- José María Pico (1764, San Xavier de Cavazan, Sonora, México–1819, San Gabriel, California) Established the prominent Pico family of Southern California.
- Luis Manuel Quintero (c. 1725–1810) African-Mexican tailor from Guadalajara, Jalisco; who later became one of the 44 original settlers of the Pueblo de Los Angeles (present-day Los Angeles, California) on September 4, 1781.
- Juan Francisco Reyes (soldier) (1749–1809) Soldado de cuero ("leather-jacketed soldier") on the 1769 Portola expedition, alcalde (municipal magistrate) of the Pueblo de Los Angeles for three terms, and recipient of the Spanish land grant for Rancho Los Encinos and later Lompoc.
- Salvador Rodríguez (1688–after 1796) Spanish politician who served as mayor of San Antonio, Texas, in 1785 and 1796, as well as regidor (councilor) of the city.

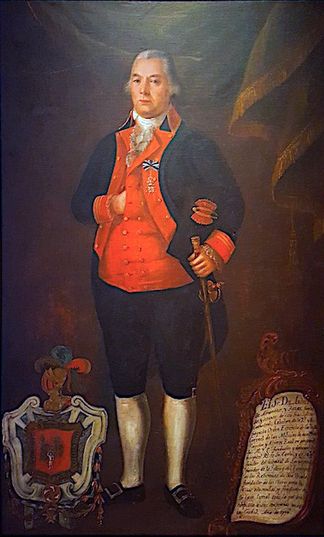
Andrés Almonaster y Rojas

- Andrés Almonaster y Rojas (born Mairena del Alcor, June 19, 1728–died New Orleans, April 25, 1798) Spanish civil servant in New Orleans.
- José Antonio Roméu (c. 1742–1792) Governor of Alta California and Baja California from 1791 to 1792.
- Francisco María Ruiz (1754–1839) Early settler of San Diego, California
- José Francisco Ruiz (c. January 28, 1783 – January 19, 1840) Soldier, revolutionary, educator, politician, and Texas Senator.

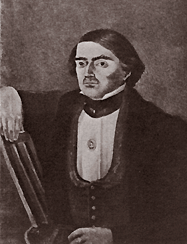
José Francisco Ruiz

- Don Tomás Sánchez (June 4, 1709 – January 21, 1796) Veteran Spanish captain who founded Laredo, Texas, and Nuevo Laredo in Mexico, at the time the only town in the Nuevo Santander Province.
- Vicente Francisco de Sarría (1767 Etxebarri–1835 Soledad) Basque Spanish missionary to the Americas.
- Manuel de Sandoval - (18th century) New Mexican prominent military and the governor of Coahuila (1729–1733 ) and Texas (1734–1736)
- Vicente de Santa Maria (1742–July 16, 1806) Spanish Franciscan priest who accompanied explorer Juan de Ayala on the first Spanish naval entry aboard the San Carlos into the San Francisco Bay.
- José Francisco de Paula Señan (March 3, 1760 – August 24, 1823) Spanish missionary to the Americas.
- Juan José Sepúlveda (1764–1808) Landowner.
- Manuel Antonio Santiago Tarín (1811–1849) Tejano soldier and recruiter and participant in the Texas Revolution on the Texian side. His father was a Spanish military officer.
- Vicente Álvarez Travieso (1705–1779) Spanish judge and politician who served as first alguacil mayor (high sheriff) (1731–79) of San Antonio, Texas.
- José de Urrutia (c. 1678–1741) Spanish explorer and settler of Texas who became captain of San Antonio de Béjar Presidio and lived for many years with the Native Americans of East Texas.
- Juan Martín de Veramendi (December 17, 1778 – 1833) Spanish (1778–1821) and after Mexican independence a Mexican (1821–33) politician who served as governor of the Mexican state of Coahuila y Tejas from 1832 until 1833.
- José María Verdugo (1751–1831) Recipient of the Rancho San Rafael land grant, San Diego.
- Manuel Victoria (died 1833) Governor of the Mexican territory of Alta California from January 1831 to December 6, 1831.
- Tomás Felipe de Winthuisen Governor of Texas from 1741 to 1743.
- Antonio Gil Ybarbo (1729–1809), pioneering settler of Nacogdoches, Texas.
- José Antonio Yorba (July 20, 1743 – January 16, 1825) Spanish soldier and early settler of Spanish California.

== Naturalized Americans of colonial origin ==
When the Spanish and Mexican territories were incorporated as part of the United States, their inhabitants automatically acquired American citizenship. Louisiana (which was Spanish between 1762 and 1800, when Spain gave back the territory to France) was ceded to the US by France in 1803, Florida was sold by Spain in 1819 and the Southwest passed to the US after the Mexican–American War (1846–1848) by the terms of the Guadalupe Hidalgo Treaty, while Texas separated from Mexico in 1836 and was annexed by the United States on December 29, 1845.

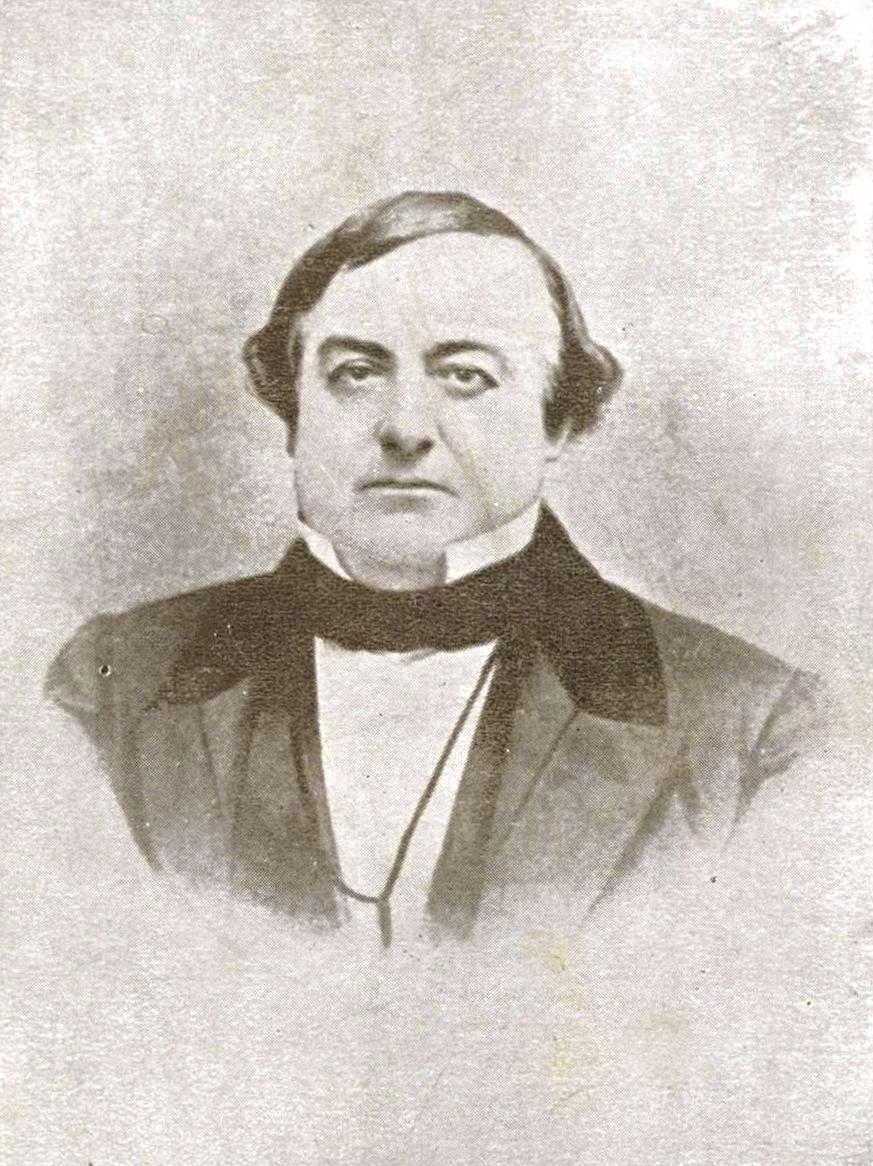
Juan Bautista Alvarado

- Cristobal Aguilar Pioneer of 19th-century Los Angeles, California, politics in the early days of American rule. He was the last Hispanic mayor of the city until 2005.
- José Antonio Aguirre (early Californian) (1799–1860) Merchant and rancher in Alta California.
- Juan Bautista Vigil y Alarid - (1792–1866) Governor of New Mexico in 1846
- Diego Archuleta (1814 – 1884), member of the Mexican Congress, soldier in the Mexican Army during the Mexican–American War, Indian agent appointed by President Abraham Lincoln, and member of the Union Army (US Army) during the American Civil War. He was the first Hispanic Brigadier General.
- Micaela Almonester, Baroness de Pontalba (1795 - 1874) was a wealthy New Orleans-born aristocrat, businesswoman, and real estate developer, and one of the most dynamic personalities of that city's history. She was daughter of Andres Almonester y Rojas, and aristocrat Cajun Louise Denis de la Ronde.
- Juan Bautista Alvarado, February 14, 1809 – July 13, 1882) Californio and twice governor of Alta California, from 1836 to 1837 and 1838 to 1842
- José María Alviso (November 19, 1798 – June 18, 1853) Grantee of Rancho Milpitas, Alcalde (mayor) of San José.
- Concepción Argüello (February 19, 1791 – December 23, 1857) Alta Californian noted for her romance with Nikolai Rezanov, a Russian promoter of the colonization of Alaska and California.
- Santiago Argüello (1791–1862) Californio soldier in the Spanish army of the Viceroyalty of New Spain in Las Californias.
- Santiago E. Argüello (1813–1857) Son of Santiago Argüello, born August 18, 1813.

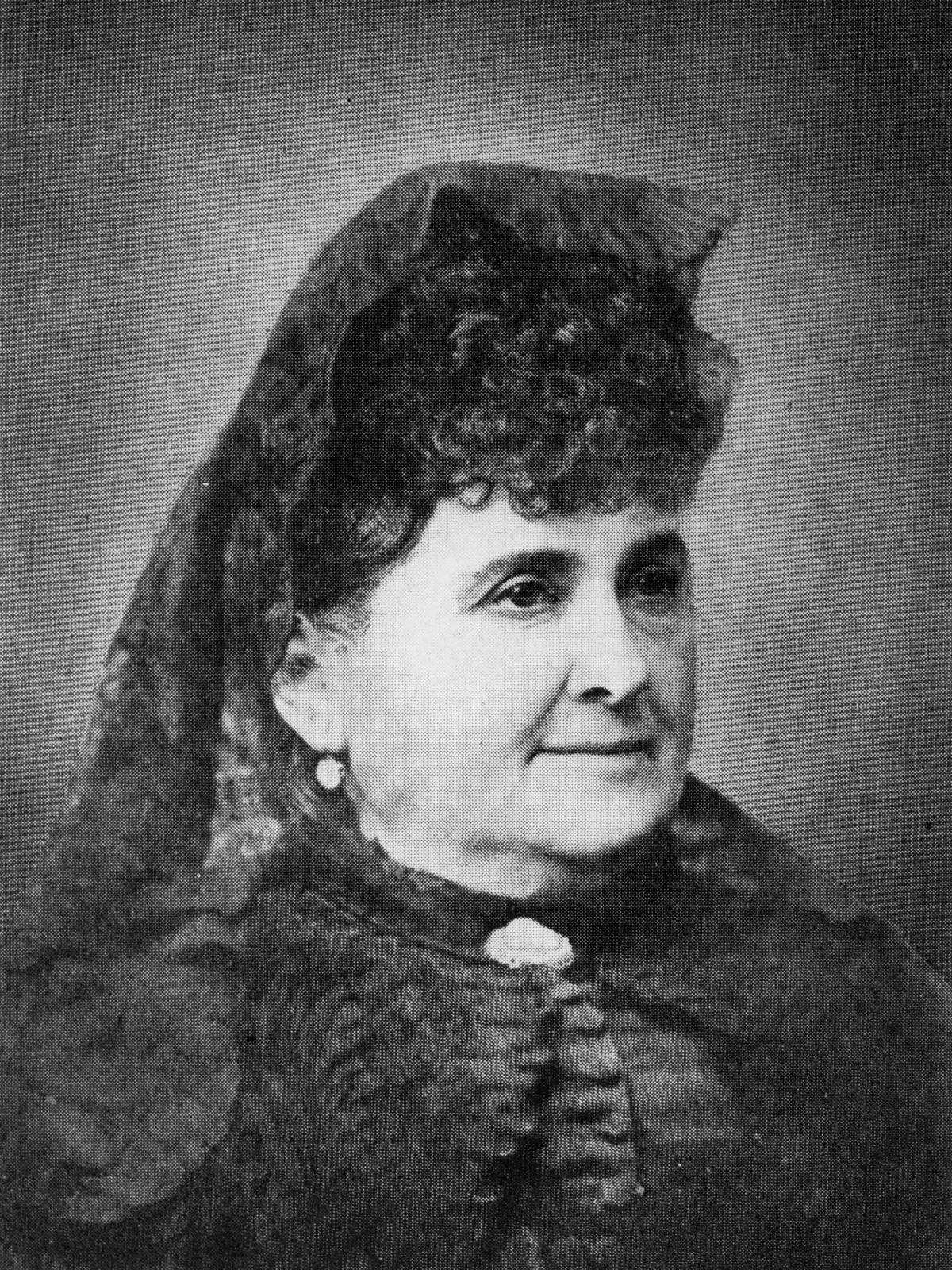
Arcadia Bandini de Stearns Baker

- Manuel Armijo - (ca. 1793–1853) Three times as governor of New Mexico.
- Casimiro Barela (1847 - 1920), an early Colorado legislator and senator
- Arcadia Bandini de Stearns Baker (1825–1912) Wealthy Los Angeles landowner, she was the granddaughter of the Spanish captain José María Estudillo.
- Juan Bandini (1800–November 4, 1859) Peruvian-born early settler of what would become San Diego, California.
- Santos Benavides (November 1, 1823 – November 9, 1891) Tejano Confederate colonel during the American Civil War
- Berryessa family Early Basque Spanish settlers of Alta California who held extensive land grants (see José de los Reyes Berryessa)
- Eugene W. Biscailuz (1883–1969) Sheriff of Los Angeles County, his mother was descended from old Spanish settlers in California.
- Dionisio Botiller (1842–1915) Member of the Los Angeles, California, Common Council, the governing body of the city.
- Charles Dominique Joseph Bouligny ( 1773 –1833) was a lawyer and politician, and served as a United States senator from Louisiana between 1824 and 1829. He was the son of Francisco Bouligny.
- Guillermo Castro (born 1810, date of death unknown) Californio soldier, rancher, surveyor, and magistrate
- José María Jesús Carbajal (1809–1874) Tejano freedom fighter who opposed the Centralist government installed by Antonio López de Santa Anna.
- José Francisco Chaves (June 27, 1833 – November 26, 1904) New Mexican military leader, politician, lawyer and rancher from the New Mexico Territory
- Julián A. Chávez - (1808 – 1879) Rancher, landowner and member of the Los Angeles Common Council (modern City Council) and the Los Angeles County Board of Supervisors.
- Manuel Antonio Chaves (c. 1818–1889), known as El Leoncito (the Little Lion) Soldier in the Mexican Army.
- Jacob De Cordova (June 6, 1808 – January 26, 1868) Founder of the Jamaica Gleaner.
- José Antonio Carrillo (1796–1862) a Californio rancher, officer, and politician in the early years of Mexican Alta California and California as part of the United States.
- José Castro (1808–February 1860) General in the Mexican army of Alta California.
- Víctor Castro (1817–1897) Landowner in an area of Alta California which later became part of Contra Costa County, California.
- Eulogio F. de Celis Largest landowner in the San Fernando Valley section of Los Angeles, California, in the mid-19th Century.
- Julián A. Chávez (January 7, 1808 – July 25, 1879) Rancher, landowner and elected official in early Los Angeles, California, who served multiple terms on the Los Angeles Common Council (the forerunner to the present-day City Council) and the Los Angeles County Board of Supervisors.
- Joseph Chiles (July 16, 1810 – June 25, 1885) Early California pioneer and guide
- Antonio F. Coronel (October 21, 1817 Mexico City–April 17, 1894) Fourth mayor of Los Angeles, served from 1853 to 1854.
- Ygnacio Coronel (1795–1862) Settler in early Los Angeles and a member of the Los Angeles Common Council.
- Leonardo Cota (1816–1887) Captain with the Californios who fought in the Mexican–American War, later a Los Angeles County Supervisor).
- Henriette DeLille (1813–1862) Founded the Catholic order of the Sisters of the Holy Family in New Orleans, which was composed of free women of color. Her mother was a Creole of color of French, Spanish and African ancestry and was born in New Orleans.
- Manuel Dominguez (1804–1882) Alcalde (mayor) of Los Angeles (1832), he was of Spanish settler descent.
- José María de Echeandía (died 1871) Mexican governor of Alta California, from 1825 to 1831 and again from 1832 to 1833.
- Juan José Elguézabal (1781-1840) Governor of Coahuila y Tejas between 1834 and 1835.
- Albert Estopinal (1845–1919) Sugar cane planter from St. Bernard Parish, Louisiana, who served as a Democrat in both houses of the Louisiana State Legislature between 1876 and 1900 and in the United States House of Representatives from Louisiana's 1st Congressional district from 1908 until his death. His ancestors came from the Canary Islands, Spain.

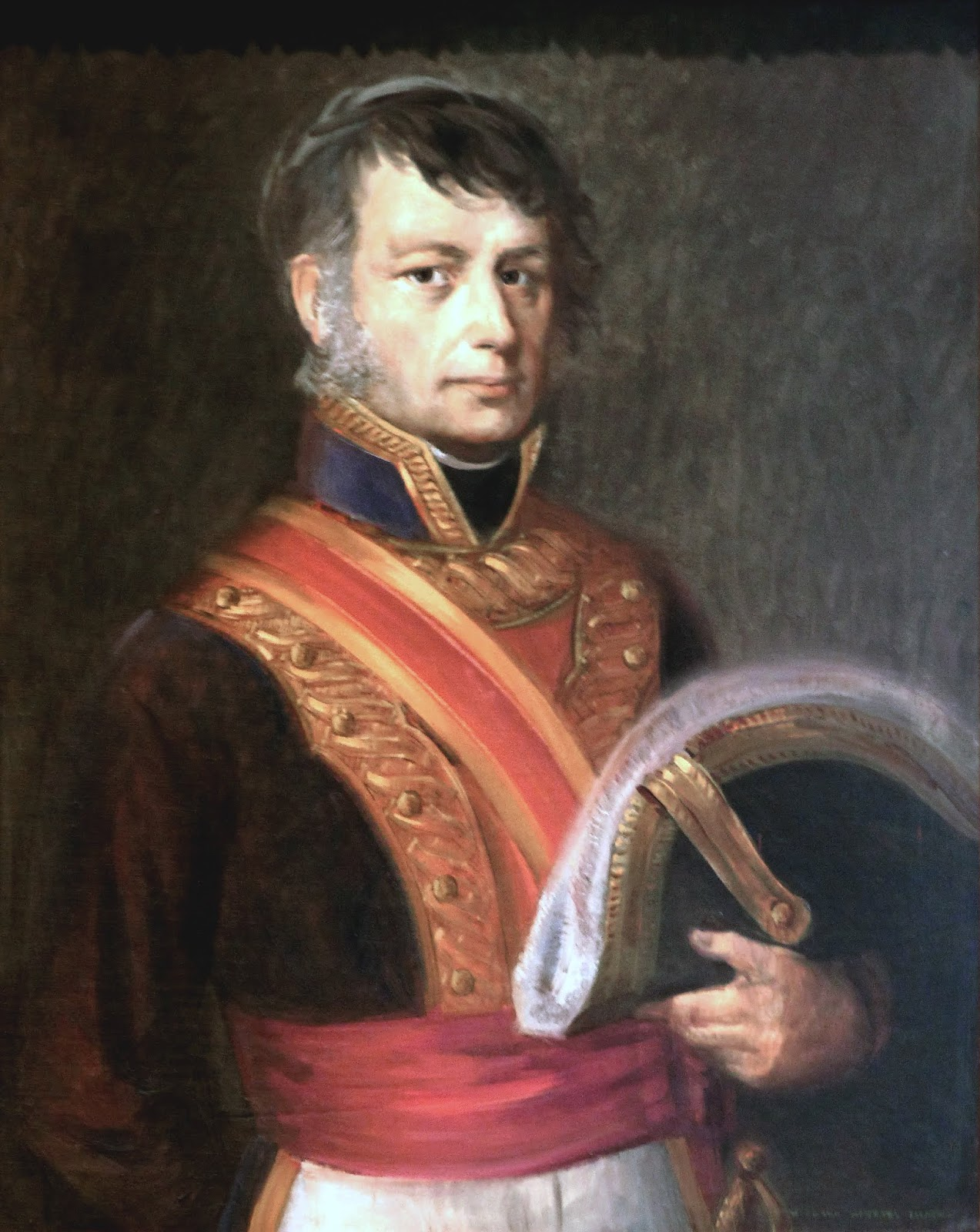
Jose Maria Estudillo

- José Antonio Estudillo (2 Nov 1803–July 20, 1852) Californio and an early settler of San Diego, California.
- José Joaquín Estudillo (1800–1852) Second alcalde of Yerba Buena, California (the precursor to San Francisco), whose land holdings, known as Rancho San Leandro, formed the basis of the city of San Leandro.
- José María Estudillo (?-1830) early settler of San Diego, California, and governing official during San Diego's Mexican period
- José María Flores (1818, New Spain–1866) Officer in the Mexican Army
- Juan Flores (c. 1834–February 14, 1857) Nineteenth-century Californio bandit who, with Pancho Daniel, led an outlaw gang known as "las Manillas" (the Handcuffs) and later as the Flores–Daniel Gang, throughout Southern California during 1856–1857.
- Manuel N. Flores (c. 1801–1868) Served as a volunteer in the Texan army in 1835–38.
- Salvador Flores (c. 1806–1855) Served as a volunteer in the Texan Army in 1835–1836.

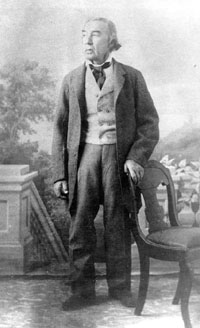
José Antonio Navarro

- José Manuel Gallegos (October 30, 1815 – April 21, 1875) Delegate to the United States Congress from the Territory of New Mexico.
- Carlos de la Garza (1807–1882), rancher in Goliad. He fought against the General Santa Ana in the Texas Revolution, in 1836.
- José Antonio de la Garza (1776–c. 1851) a Tejano noted for being the first landowner in San Antonio, Texas and the first man to create a coin in the state; elected mayor of San Antonio in 1813 and 1832.
- José de la Guerra y Noriega (March 6, 1779 – February 18, 1858) Soldier and early settler in California.
- Antonio Maria de la Guerra (1825–1881) Mayor of Santa Barbara, California, several times a member of the Santa Barbara County Board of Supervisors, California State Senator and Captain of California Volunteers in the American Civil War. He was son of Spanish soldier José de la Guerra y Noriega.
- Francisco Guerrero (politician) (1811–13 July 1851) Alcalde of Yerba Buena (later named San Francisco) in 1836 and 1839.
- Rafael Gonzáles (1789–1857) Spanish soldier from 1780–1821; after Mexican independence a Mexican (1821–57) soldier who served as Governor of Coahuila and Texas from 1824 to 1826.
- Joseph Marion Hernández (May 26, 1788 – June 8, 1857) American of Menorcan descent; he was a soldier, politician, and owner of three plantations in Florida.
- John Horse (c. 1812–1882) African-American military adviser to the Seminole Indian chief Osceola and a leader of Black Seminole units fighting against United States troops during the Seminole Wars in Florida. He was a Seminole slave of Spanish, Seminole, and African-American descent.
- José Joaquin Jimeno (1804–1856) Spanish missionary to the Americas.
- Manuel Lisa (1772, New Orleans - 1820) Spanish fur trader, explorer, and United States Indian agent, he was among the founders in St. Louis of the Missouri Fur Company, an early fur trading company, and was also among the first settlers of Nebraska.
- José del Carmen Lugo (1813–c. 1870) Californio landowner in the Los Angeles area.
- Tranquilino Luna (February 25, 1849 – November 20, 1892) Delegate to the United States House of Representatives from the Territory of New Mexico.
- Francisco Antonio Manzanares (1843–1904) Californio businessman and politician
- Eulalia Pérez de Guillén Mariné (c. 1766–1878) Californio supercentenarian and owner of Rancho del Rincón de San Pascual in southern California
- Paul Charles Morphy (1837–1884) American chess player, he was from a Creole family of French and Spanish descent.
- Suzanne Malveaux - TV News Reporter; from a Creole family in Louisiana of French, Spanish and African origin.
- Domingo Marcucci (1827–1905) Venezuelan born shipbuilder and shipowner settled in San Francisco, California
- Juan María Marrón (February 8, 1808 – September 17, 1853) Early settler of San Diego, California.
- Antonio José Martínez (1793–1867) New Mexican priest, educator, publisher, rancher, farmer, community leader, and politician.
- Antonio Menchaca (1800–1879) Tejano military and politician who fought in the Texas Revolution and was mayor of San Antonio, Texas (1838–39). His great-great grandfather was one of the founders and early settlers of Béxar.
- Manuel Micheltorena (1802–7 September 1853) Brigadier general of the Mexican Army, adjutant-general of the same, governor, commandant-general and inspector of the department of California.
- Juana Briones de Miranda (1802–1889) Pioneering resident of San Francisco, California who made a name for herself in multiple arenas of activity.
- Joseph Montoya (1915–1978) Democratic United States Senator from the state of New Mexico
- Juan Moya (1806–1874) Prominent Tejano landowner and Mexican army captain who fought in the Texas Revolution.
- Esteban Munrás (1798–1850) Nineteenth-century Spanish artist, probably best known for the vibrantly colored frescoes that adorn the chapel interior at Mission San Miguel Arcángel in California.
- Joaquin Murrieta (c. 1829–c. July 25, 1853) His life provided the basis for the fictional hero Zorro.
- Ramón Músquiz (1797–1867) Tejano who served as political chief of Texas from 1828 to 1834.
- Antonio Narbona (1773–1830) Spanish soldier born in Mobile when it was part of Spanish Louisiana. He was governor of Santa Fe de Nuevo México between September 1825 and 1827, and fought the Native Americans in the northern part of Mexico (now the southwestern United States) around the turn of the 19th century. He was of Spanish descent.
- José Antonio Navarro (February 27, 1795 – January 13, 1871) Texas statesman, revolutionary, politician, rancher, and merchant.

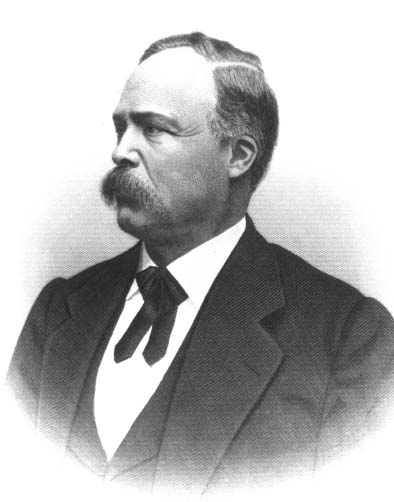
Miguel Antonio Otero

- Miguel Antonio Otero (born 1829) Spanish politician in the New Mexico Territory
- Mariano S. Otero (1844–1904) a Congressional delegate from the Territory of New Mexico
- Romualdo Pacheco (October 31, 1831 – January 23, 1899) Californio politician and diplomat, he was the 12th Governor of California.
- Luís María Peralta (1759, Sonora, New Spain–August 26, 1851) Soldier in the Spanish Army.
- Ignacio Peralta - April 3, 1791 – May 9, 1874) Spanish settler in California, the eldest son of Luís María Peralta.
- Francisco Perea (January 9, 1830 – May 21, 1913) Union Army officer in the American Civil War and a cousin of Pedro Perea. He was a delegate for the Territory of New Mexico to the 38th United States Congress from Mary 4, 1863 to March 3, 1865.
- Manuel Pérez (1735-1819), Lieutenant Governor of Upper Louisiana in 1787-1792. He lived in New Orleans from 1790 until his death.
- Andrés Pico (November 18, 1810 – February 14, 1876) Californio who became a successful rancher, and served as a military commander during the Mexican–American War; he was elected to the state assembly and senate after California became a state, when he was also commissioned as a brigadier general in the state militia.
- Pío Pico (May 5, 1801 – September 11, 1894) Last Mexican governor of Alta California, namesake of Pico Rivera, California.
- Manuel Requena (1802–1876) President of the Los Angeles Common Council in the early 1850s. He served the city in both the Mexican and American periods.
- José González Rubio (1804–1875) Roman Catholic friar prominent in the early history of California.
- Francisco Antonio Ruiz (c. 1804–October 18, 1876) Alcalde of San Antonio during the Texas Revolution and was responsible for identifying the bodies of those killed at the Battle of the Alamo.
- José de la Cruz Sánchez (1799–1878) Eleventh alcalde (mayor) of San Francisco in 1845.
- Robert Fortune Sanchez (1934–2012) Archbishop of the Roman Catholic Archdiocese of Santa Fe, New Mexico. Some of his ancestors were Spanish settlers in New Mexico.
- Francisco Sánchez (April 11, 1805 – September 8, 1862) Commander of the San Francisco Presidio and the 8th alcalde of San Francisco in 1843
- Tomas Avila Sanchez (1826–1882) Soldier, sheriff and public official, who served on the Los Angeles County, California, Board of Supervisors and was a member of the Los Angeles Common Council, the legislative branch of the city.
- Francisco Xavier Sepúlveda (1742–1788) Mexican colonial soldier and patriarch of the prominent Spanish Mexican Sepúlveda family in the early days of Las Californias and Alta California in present-day Southern California.
- Francisco Sepúlveda (1775–1853) Landowner and progenitor of one of the branches of the prominent Spanish Mexican Sepúlveda family in the early days of California's settlement.

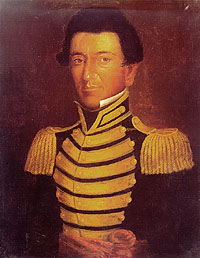
Juan Seguin

- Juan Seguín (October 27, 1806 – August 27, 1890) Nineteenth-century Texas senator, mayor, judge, and justice of the peace; he was a leader of the Texas Revolution.
- Erasmo Seguín - (May 26, 1782 – October 30, 1857) Prominent citizen and politician in San Antonio de Bexar (modern-day San Antonio, Texas) in the 19th century.
- Manuel Antonio Santiago Tarín (1811–1849) (also known as Manuel Leal) was a Mexican soldier and a recruiter and participant in the Texas Revolution on the Texian side.
- Mariano Guadalupe Vallejo - (4 July 1807 – 18 January 1890) Californio military commander, politician, and rancher.
- Juan Martín de Veramendi (1778–1833) governor of the Mexican state of Coahuila y Tejas from 1832 until 1833.
- Francisca Benicia Carrillo de Vallejo (1815-1891) Californio-born. She was an early settler of Sonoma, California.
- Benito Vázquez (1738–1810), Spanish-born soldier, fur trader, merchant and explorer. He emigrated to Missouri when it was part of Louisiana and lived there until the end of his life.
- Louis Vasquez (1798–1868) - Mountain man and trader. Born in Missouri, he was the son of Benito Vázquez
- Tiburcio Vásquez (April 11, 1835 – March 19, 1875) a Californio bandit
- Bernardo Yorba (1800–1858) Son of the Spanish soldier, José Antonio Yorba, was one of the most successful ranchers in Alta California, having thousands of cattle and horses grazing on land grants totaling more than 35,000 acres.
- Agustín Vicente Zamorano (1798–1842) Printer, soldier, and provisional Mexican Governor of Alta California.
- Ignacio Zaragoza (March 24, 1829 – September 8, 1862) General in the Mexican army, best known for defeating invading French forces at the Battle of Puebla on May 5, 1862.

== Descendants of Spanish and Mexican settlers in the modern United States ==
These are descendants of Spanish and Mexican settlers who were born in the United States after 1803 in Louisiana, after 1819 in Florida and after 1850 in the Southwest:

Ezequiel Cabeza De Baca

- Rudolfo Anaya American author.
- Antonio D. Archuleta (1855–1918), member of the Colorado Senate.
- Gloria Anzaldúa (1942–2004) Scholar of Chicana cultural theory, feminist theory, and queer theory, she was a descendant of many of the prominent Basque and Spanish explorers and settlers who came to the Americas in the 16th and 17th centuries.
- Avila family of California
- Polly Baca American politician who served as chair of the Democratic Caucus of the Colorado House of Representatives (1976–79), being the first woman to hold that office, and the first Hispanic woman elected to the Colorado State Senate as well as first elected to the House and Senate of a state Legislature.
- Ezequiel Cabeza De Baca (1864–1917) First Hispano elected for office as Lieutenant Governor in New Mexico's first election. A member of the Baca Family of New Mexico, he is a descendant of the original Spanish settlers.
- Stephen Vincent Benét (1827–1895) Born in Saint Augustine, Florida, he was an officer in the United States Army. His grandfather was a Spanish settler in Florida.
- William Rose Benét (1886–1950) American poet, writer, and editor. Stephen Vincent Benet's grandson
- Stephen Vincent Benét (1898–1943) American poet, short story writer, and novelist. Stephen Vincent Benet's grandson
- Laura Benét (1884–1979), was an American social worker, biographer and newspaper editor. Stephen Vincent Benet's granddaughter
- Joan Bennett (1910–1990) American stage, film and television actress, her mother was actress Adrienne Morrison, daughter of actor Lewis Morrison, who was of English, Spanish, Jewish, and African ancestry.
- Constance Bennett (1904–1965) American actress, sister of Joan Bennett
- Barbara Bennett (1906–1958) Actress and dancer, sister of Joan and Constance Bennett
- Dionisio Botiller (1842–1915) Member of the Los Angeles Common Council, the governing body of the city, in June 1868, December 1868 and in 1869, as well as the city auditor for eight years. His family were Californios.
- John Edward Bouligny (1824–1864) U.S. Congressman, grandson of Francisco Bouligny
- Leo Carrillo (1881–1961) Actor, vaudevillian, political cartoonist, and conservationist, his great-great grandfather, José Raimundo Carrillo (1749–1809) Spanish settler in San Diego, California.
- Ezequiel Cabeza De Baca (1864–1917) First Hispanic elected for office as Lieutenant Governor in New Mexico's first election, and also a descendant of the Baca Family of New Mexico.
- Angelico Chavez (April 10, 1910 – March 18, 1996) Franciscan priest, historian, author, poet, and painter from New Mexico.
- Denise Chavez New Mexican author, playwright, and stage director.
- Dennis Chavez (1888–1962) Democratic U.S. Senator from New Mexico.
- Linda Chavez Her father's ancestors came to New Mexico from Spain in 1601.
- Henry Cisneros Politician and businessman
- Gil Cisneros - His great-grandmother was born in Los Angeles in the early 19th century.
- Page Cortez Isleño Businessman from Lafayette, Louisiana, a Republican member of the Louisiana State Senate from District 23.
- Henriette DeLille (1813–1862) Nun who founded the Catholic order of the Sisters of the Holy Family in New Orleans, which was composed of free women of color. Her mother was a Creole of color of French, Spanish and African ancestry and was born in New Orleans.
- Aurelio Macedonio Espinosa Sr. - (1880–1958). Professor who studied the Spanish American folklore and philology. He descended of the first New Mexicans to settle in Colorado in the mid-1800s.
- Aurelio Macedonio Espinosa Jr., (1907–2004), son of Aurelio Macedonio Espinosa Sr. Professor at Stanford University and an expert on Spanish linguistics, focusing on Spanish American folklore.
- Albert Estopinal, Jr. (1869–1952) Attorney and politician from St. Bernard Parish in south Louisiana. He was son of Albert Estopinal.
- Joe Falcon (September 28, 1900 – November 19, 1965) Cajun accordion player in southwest Louisiana, best known for the first recording of a Cajun song entitled "Allons à Lafayette" in 1928. He was descendant of Isleños and Cajuns
- Joachim O. Fernández (August 14, 1896 – August 8, 1978) Isleño politician
- Robert Fortune Sanchez (20 March 1934 – 20 January 2012) Archbishop of the Roman Catholic Archdiocese of Santa Fe, New Mexico, in the United States.

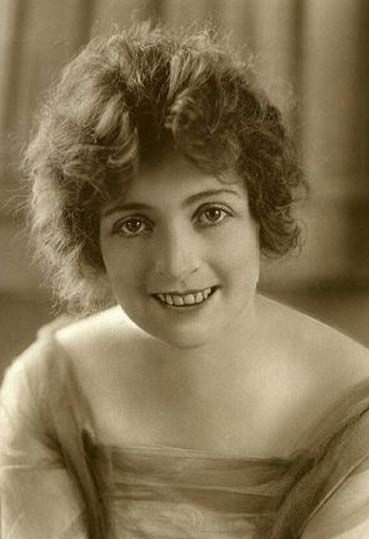
Myrtle Gonzalez

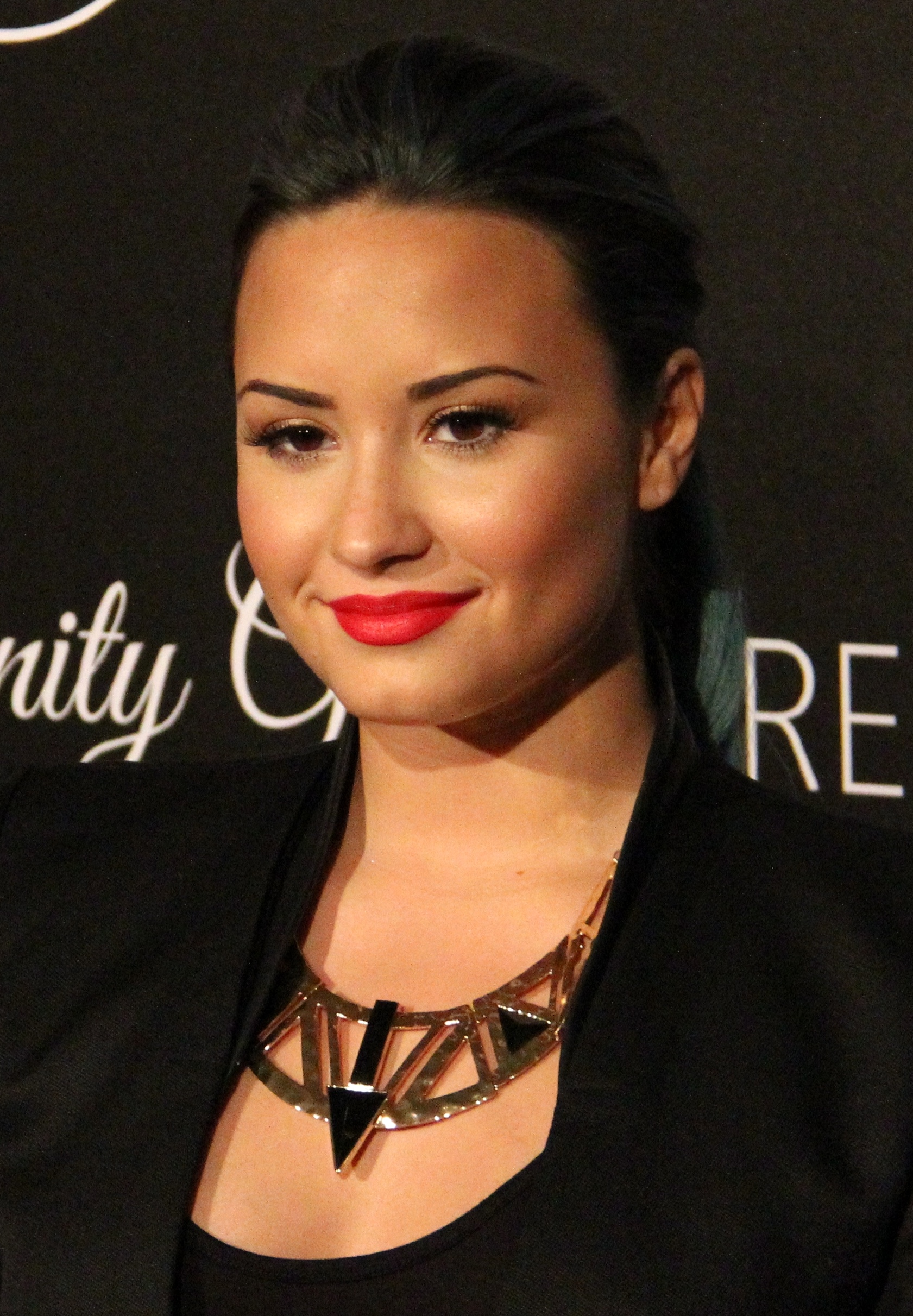
Demi Lovato

- John Gavin (1931-2018) American actor of Chilean and Mexican descent. His paternal ancestors, including Cayetano Apablasa, were landowners in Spanish California
- William Gaxton (1893–1963) Film and theater actor
- Lita Grey (1908–1995) American actress, her mother's family was descended from a Californian Spanish family.
- Joseph Gonzales (politician) (1862–1940) Isleño politician who served as first Mayor of Gonzales, Louisiana.
- Myrtle Gonzalez (September 28, 1891 – October 22, 1918) American actress. Her paternal side comes from a native Hispanic Californio family of Spain.
- Eva Longoria - Tejano actress of colonial descent.
- Michelle Lujan Grisham - American lawyer and politician serving as the 32nd governor of New Mexico since 2019.
- Demi Lovato American actor and singer. They are a descendant of Civil War veteran Francisco Perea and Santa Fe de Nuevo México governor Francisco Xavier Chávez.
- Ben Ray Luján, US Congressman
- Manuel Lujan, Former US Congressman, Secretary of the Interior
- Tranquilino Luna (1849–1892) Delegate to the House of Representatives from the Territory of New Mexico.
- Patricia Madrid, American politician who served in New Mexico.
- Louis H. Marrero (1847–1921) Prominent American military, politician, businessman, banker, chief of police and landowner whose political career was played in Louisiana´s state.

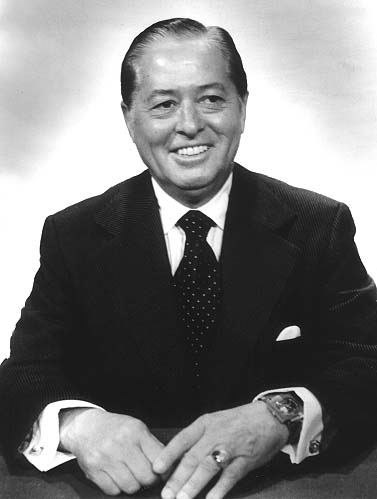
Joseph M Montoya

- Morris W. Morris (1845–1906) Soldier in the Louisiana Native Guards during the Civil War and later a stage actor.
- Adrienne Morrison American actress, daughter of actor Lewis Morrison, who was of English, Spanish, Jewish, and African ancestry.
- Joseph Montoya (1915–1978) Democratic U.S. Senator from New Mexico
- Alcide Nunez (March 17, 1884 – September 2, 1934) Early white American jazz clarinetist, he was of Isleño descent.
- Samuel B. Nunez Jr. Isleño politician from Louisiana
- Miguel Antonio Otero (born 1859) Governor of the New Mexico Territory (1897–1906)
- Pedro Perea (April 22, 1852 – January 11, 1906) Delegate from the Territory of New Mexico, cousin of Francisco Perea.
- Irvan Perez American Isleño décima singer and woodcarver
- Leander Perez (July 16, 1891 – March 19, 1969) Democratic political boss of Plaquemines and St. Bernard parishes in southeastern Louisiana during the middle third of the 20th century.
- Manuel Perez (1871–1946) American cornetist and bandleader born into a Creole of Color family of Spanish, French and African descent
- Robert Ri'chard Television and film actor of Louisiana Creole (French, African American, Native American, and Spanish) descent
- Edward R. Roybal (February 10, 1916 – October 24, 2005) Member of the Los Angeles, California, City Council for thirteen years and of the U.S. House of Representatives for thirty years.
- Matthew Randazzo V American true crime writer and historian of Isleño, Cajun and Sicilian descent.
- Juan Bautista Rael (1900–1993) Ethnographer, linguist, and folklorist who was a pioneer in New Mexican ethnography, including the stories and language of Hispanics from northern New Mexico and Southern Colorado.
- Junior Rodriguez Isleño politician in Louisiana.
- Edward L. Romero Coloradan whose family was originally from New Mexico, he is an entrepreneur and an American diplomat who served as the US ambassador to Spain and Andorra between 1998 and 2001.

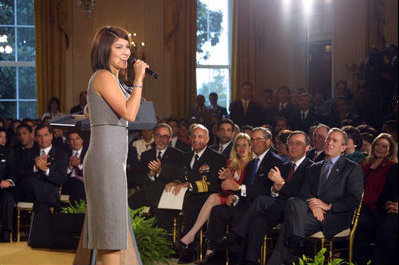
Jaci Velásquez

- Trinidad Romero Isleño politician in Louisiana.
- Marin Sais - (1890–1971) American actress of the silent film era. She was descended from early Castilian settlers of colonial California.
- Agueda Salazar (1898—2000) weaver, head of New Mexico's largest Hispanic weaving family
- John Salazar - former Congressman for Colorado's 3rd congressional district, serving from 2005 until 2011
- Ken Salazar - 50th United States Secretary of the Interior in the administration of President Barack Obama from 2009 to 2013. He is a descendant of Spanish settlers in New Spain in 16th century. Brother of John Salazar
- Paul Sanchez Isleño musician from Louisiana.
- Jaci Velasquez Tejano singer.
- Adelina Otero-Warren (1881–1965)- Nuevomexicana woman's suffragist, educator, and politician in the United States
- Adina Emilia De Zavala (1861–1955) Tejano teacher, historian and preservationist of Texas history.

== See also ==
- List of Spanish Americans
- List of Mexican Americans
- Cuban Americans
- Hispanic and Latino Americans
- Californios (List of notable Californios)
- Floridanos
- Neomexicano (List of Notable Hispanos of New Mexico and Colorado)
- Tejanos (List of Notable Tejanos)
- Louisiana Creole people
  - Isleños in Louisiana (List of Notable Isleños in Louisiana)
- Spanish Empire
- Spanish colonization of the Americas
- Viceroyalty of New Spain
- List of viceroys of New Spain
- List of governors of California before 1850
- List of Spanish governors of New Mexico
- List of Texas governors and presidents
- List of colonial governors of Louisiana
- Royal Governor of La Florida
- List of Cajuns
