= List of mayors of San Antonio =

Mayor of the City of San Antonio
- Coat of Arms of San Antonio

- Flag of San Antonio

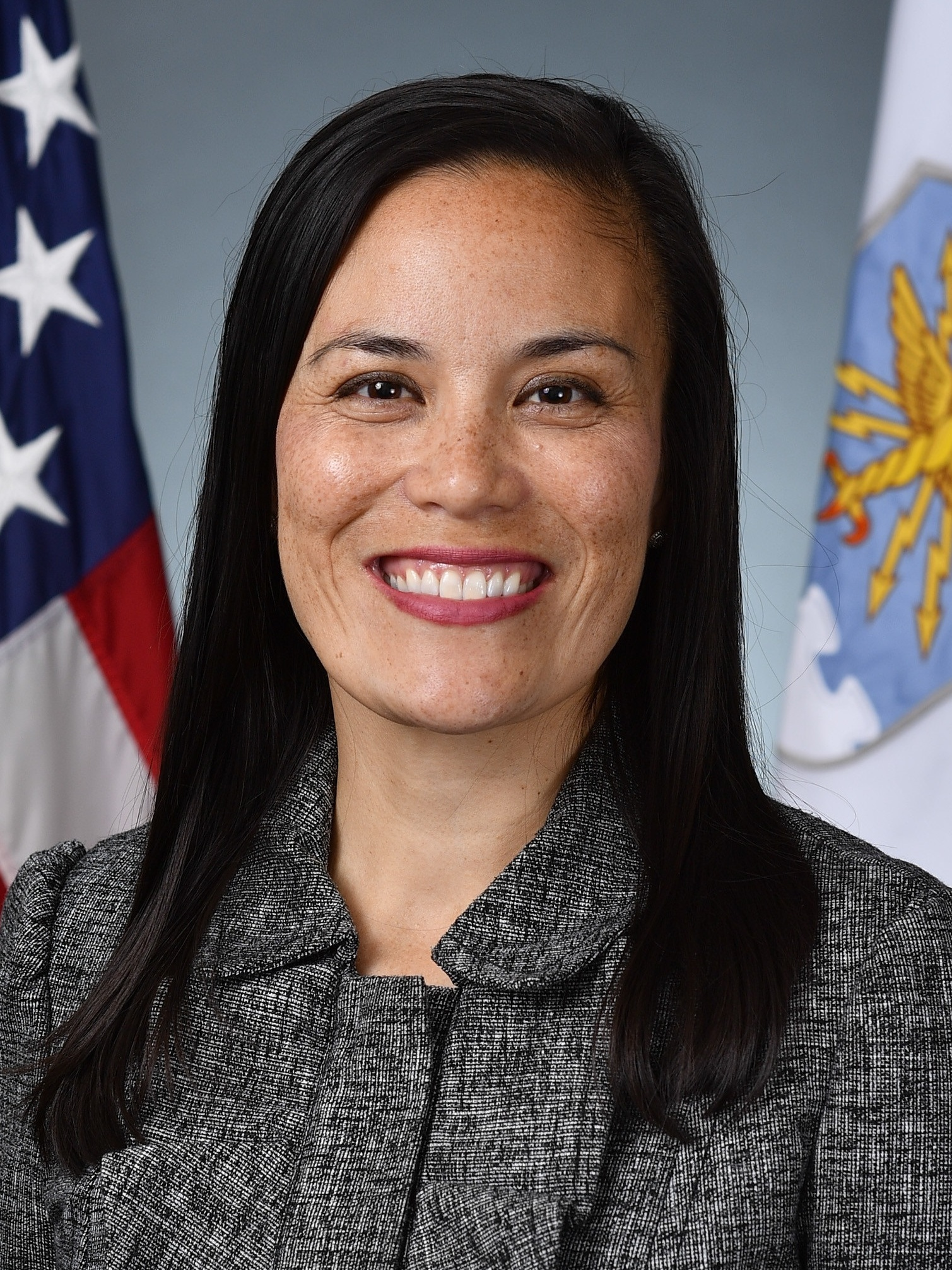
- Incumbent; Gina Ortiz Jones since June 18, 2025
- Residence: Private residence
- Term length: 4 years; 2 term limit
- Formation: 1731
- Website: www.sanantonio.gov/Mayor

The following is a list of mayors of San Antonio, Texas.

San Antonio operates under a council–manager form of government. While the mayor presides over meetings of the City Council and is paid $3,000 more than other members of the council, the mayor does not wield executive authority or veto power. Rather, the mayor has one vote (of 11) on the city council, and the city manager, appointed by the City Council, has executive power (the city charter gives the manager the responsibility to "execute the laws and administer the government of the city"). However, the mayor does have additional ceremonial responsibilities, such as issuing proclamations. Additionally, the mayor is the only city-wide elected official, and "a high-profile mayor can wield considerable political influence" in the city. For example, the San Antonio Express-News editorial board wrote that Mayor Julian Castro has "a mastery of political skill that made him a strong force in a weak mayor structure" during his term (2009–14).

Under Texas law, the mayor, like the city council, is selected in a non-partisan election. When a vacancy occurs, the city council appoints an interim mayor. The mayor, like the other members of the city council, served a two-year term, with a four-term limit. However, due to the passage of Proposition F in 2024, the winner will receive a four-year term, as term limits were changed from four two-year terms to two four-year terms. From 1975 to 2025, every mayor of San Antonio had previously served on the city council.

== Colonial (1731–1821) and Mexican (1821–1836) San Antonio ==
The mayors of colonial San Antonio served one-year terms, although there were exceptions: some mayors, such as José Curbelo, Ignacio Lopez de Armas and Jose Felix Menchaca, held office several times. Juan Leal Goraz became the first mayor of La Villa de San Fernando, the settlement which would later become known as the city of San Antonio, after its founding on March 9, 1731.

Mayors of San Antonio, Texas
Years of service	Mayor
1731–32 (civil founding of San Antonio)	Juan Leal Goraz
1733	Antonio de los Santos
1734	Manuel de Niz
1735	Juan Leal Goraz (2nd term)
1736	Antonio de los Santos (2nd term)
1737	Juan Curbelo
1738	Ignacio Lorenzo de Armas
1739	Juan Curbelo (2nd term)
1740	Juan Delgado
1741	Antonio Rodríguez Medero
1742	Patricio Rodríguez
1743	Antonio Sosa
1744	Antonio López Aguado y Villafuente
1745	Juan José Montes de Oca
1746	José Curbelo
1747	Mateo Pérez
1748	Juan José Padrón
1748	José Leal
1750	Juan José Padrón (2nd term)
1751	José Curbelo (2nd term)
1752–53	Luis Antonio Menchaca
1755	Manuel Delgado
1756	Antonio López Aguado y Villafuente (2nd term)
1757	José Curbelo (3rd term)
1758	Juan José Flores
1759–1760	Martín Lorenzo de Armas
1761	Antonio López Aguado y Villafuente (3rd term)
1762	Juan José Flores (2nd term)
1763	Luis Antonio Menchada (2nd term)
1764	Ignacio Lorenzo de Armas (2nd term)
April 1764 – ?	Francisco Delgado
1765	Bernabé de Carbajal
1766	Domingo Delgado
1767	Miguel Gortari
1768	Jacinto Delgado
1769	Francisco Flores de Abrego
1770	Simón de Arocha
1771	José Félix Menchaca
1772–73	Domingo Delgado (2nd term)
1774	Joaquín Menchaca
1775	Amador Delgado
1776	Vicente Álvarez Travieso
1777	Manuel Delgado (2nd term)
1778	José Félix Menchaca (2nd term)
1779	Francisco Flores de Abrego (2nd term)
1780	Toribio de la Fuente Fernández
1781	Francisco Flores de Abrego (3rd term)
1782	Juan José de la Santa
1783	Manuel Delgado (3rd term)
1784	Francisco Javier Rodríguez
1785	Salvador Rodríguez
1786	Juan José de la Santa (2nd term)
1787	Simón de Arocha (2nd term)
1788	José Félix Menchaca (3rd term)
1789–90	Ignacio Calvillo
1791	Francisco de Arocha
1792	Vicente Ferrer Enriquez de Amador
1793	Manuel de Arocha
1794	Ramón de las Fuentes
1795	José Félix Menchaca (4th term)
1796	Salvador Rodríguez (2nd term)
1797	José Roberto Núñez
1798	Manuel de Arocha (2nd term)
1799	Juan José de la Garza
1800	Manuel Delgado (4th term)
1801	Manuel María Barrera
1802	José Antonio Saucedo
1803	José Félix Menchaca (5th term)
1804	Tomás de Arocha
1805	Ignacio Pérez
1806–07	José Antonio Saucedo (2nd term)
1807	Ángel Navarro
1808	Ignacio Pérez
1809	Manuel María Barrera (2nd term)
1810	Manuel Delgado (5th term)
January–February 1811	Gaspar Flores de Abrego
March 1811 – ?	Francisco Travieso
1812	Clemente Delgado
1813 (until October)	José Antonio de la Garza
1813–14	José Antonio Saucedo (3rd term)
1815	José María Zambrano
1816	Domingo Bustillos
1817	Francisco Flores
1818	Juan María Zambrano (2nd term)
1819	Francisco Montes de Oca
1820	Francisco Flores (2nd term)
1820	Erasmo Seguín (from July 25)
1821	José Ángel Navarro
1822	José María Salinas
1823	Manuel Yturri Castillo
1824	Gaspar Flores de Abrego (2nd term)
1825	Juan Martín de Veramendi
1826	Juan José Zambrano
1827	José María Salinas (2nd term)
1828	Juan Martín de Veramendi (2nd term)
1829	Gaspar Flores de Abrego (3rd term)
1830	Jose Miguel de Arciniega
1831	José María Salinas (3rd term)
1832	José Antonio de la Garza (2nd term)
1833	Jose Miguel de Arciniega (2nd term)
1834	Juan Seguín
1835	José Ángel Navarro (2nd term)
January–February 1836	Francisco Antonio Ruíz
April 1836 – 1837	José María Salinas (4th term)

== San Antonio in the Republic of Texas (1836–1844) and U.S. State of Texas (1844–present) ==
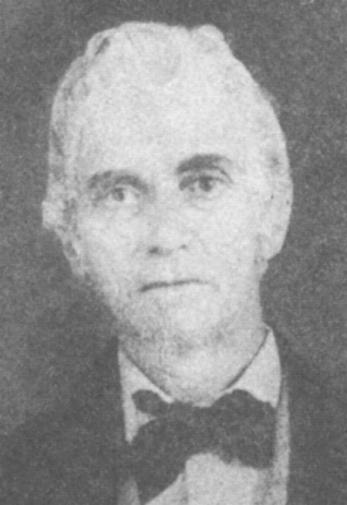
Samuel Maverick

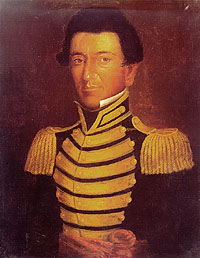
Juan Seguín

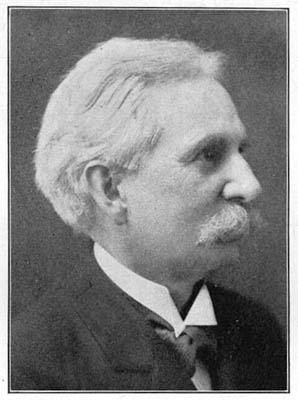
Daniel Cleveland

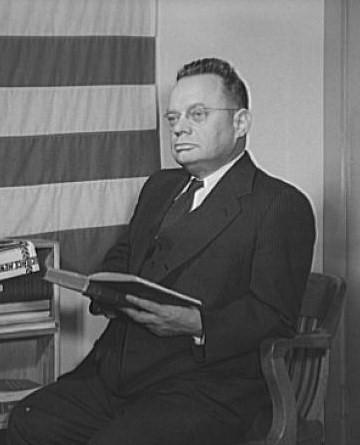
Maury Maverick

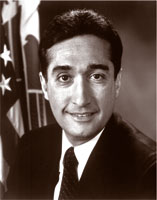
Henry Cisneros

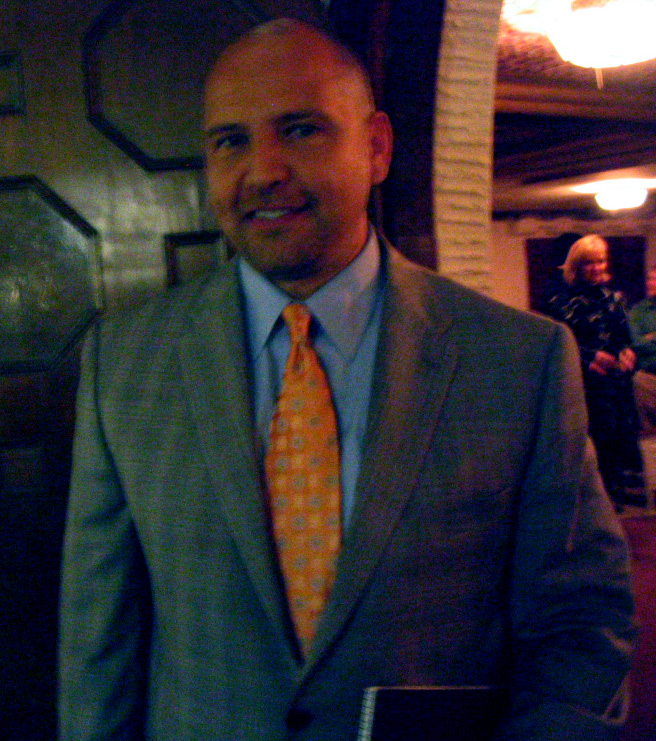
Edward D. Garza

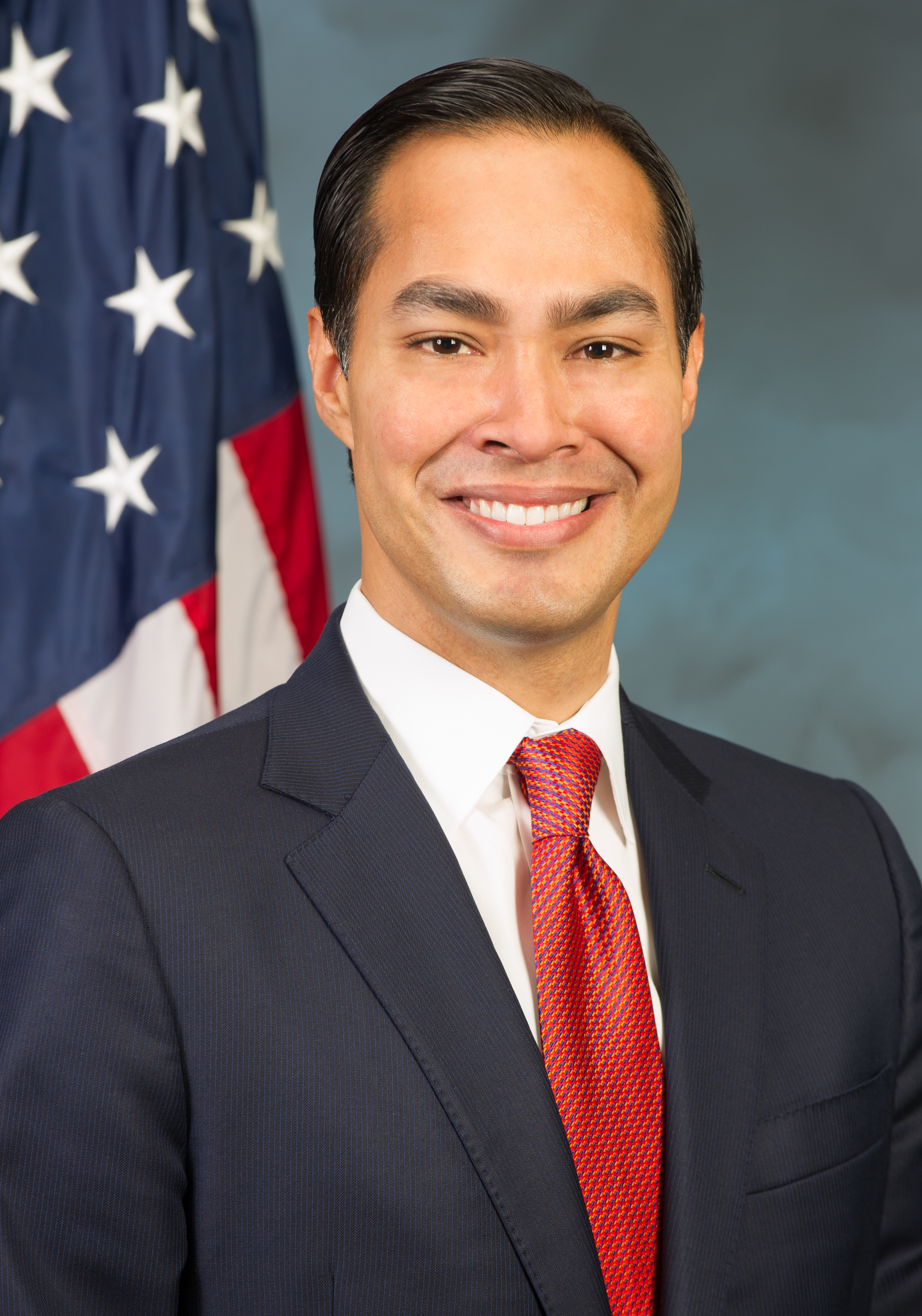
Julian Castro

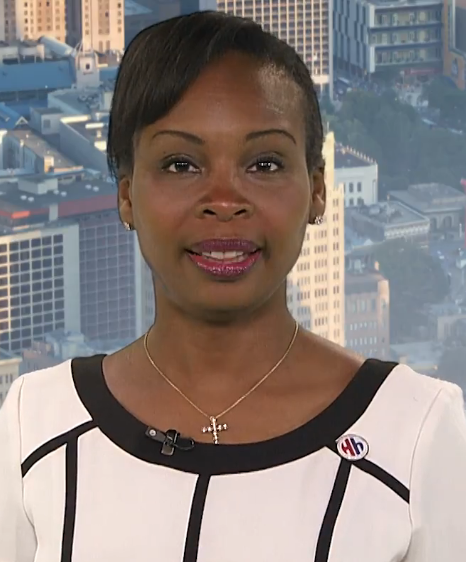
Ivy Taylor

Mayors of San Antonio, Texas
Years of service	Image	Mayor
1837–38		John W. Smith
1838		William H. Daingerfield
1838–39		Antonio Menchaca (Pro Tem)
1839–40		Samuel Maverick
1840–41		John W. Smith (2nd)
1841–42		Juan Seguín (2nd)
1841		Francis Guilbeau (Pro Tem)
1842–44		John W. Smith (3rd)
1844–46		Edward Dwyer
1846–47		Bryan Callaghan, Sr.
1847		Charles F. King
1847–48		S. S. Smith
1848		Charles F. King (2nd)
1848–49		S. S. Smith (2nd)
1849–51		J. M. Devine
1849–51		J. S. McDonald
1852–53		Charles F. King (3rd)
1853–54		J. M. Devine (2nd)
1854–55		John M. Carolan
1855–56		James R. Sweet
1856–57		J. M. Devine (3rd)
1857		J. H. Beck (Pro Tem)
1857–59		A. A. Lockwood
1859–62		James R. Sweet (2nd)
1862–63		Samuel Maverick (2nd)
1863–65		P.L. Buquor
1865		J. H. Lyons
1865–66		Daniel Cleveland
1866–67		J. H. Lyons (2nd)
1867–72		Wilhelm Carl August Thielepape
1872		S. G. Newton
1872–75		Francois P. Giraud
1875–85		James H. French
1885–92		Bryan Callaghan, Jr.
1892–93		A. I. Lockwood (Pro Tem)
1893–94		George Paschal
1894		Henry Elmendorf (Pro Tem)
1894–97		Henry Elmendorf
1897–99		Bryan Callaghan, Jr. (2nd)
1899–03		Marshall Hicks
1903		Frederick Terrell (Pro Tem)
1903–05		John P. Campbell
1905–12		Bryan Callaghan, Jr. (3rd)
1912		William L. Richter (Pro Tem)
1912–1913		A. H. Jones
1913		Albert Steves (Pro Tem)
1913–1917		Clinton G. Brown
1917–21		Sam C. Bell
1921–23		O. B. Black (Orlando Bacon Black)
1923–27		John W. Tobin
1927		Phil Wright (Pro Tem)
1927–33		C. M. Chambers
1933		C. K. Quin (Pro Tem)
1933–39		C. K. Quin
1939–41		Maury Maverick
1941–43		C. K. Quin (2nd)
1943–47		Gus B. Mauerman
1947–49		Alfred Callaghan
1949–52		A. C. (Jack) White
1952–53		Sam Bell Steves
1953–54		A. C. (Jack) White (2nd)
1954		R. L. Lester
1954–55		R. N. White, Sr.
May 1, 1955 – May 1, 1961		J. Edwin Kuykendall
May 1, 1961 – May 1, 1971		Walter W. McAllister
May 1, 1971 – May 1, 1973		John Gatti
May 1, 1973 – May 1, 1975		Charles L. Becker
May 1, 1975 – May 1, 1981		Lila Cockrell
May 1, 1981 – June 1, 1989		Henry G. Cisneros
June 1, 1989 – June 1, 1991		Lila Cockrell (2nd)
June 1, 1991 – June 1, 1995		Nelson Wolff
June 1, 1995 – June 1, 1997		William E. "Bill" Thornton
June 1, 1997 – June 1, 2001		Howard W. Peak
June 1, 2001 – June 7, 2005		Edward D. Garza
June 7, 2005 – June 1, 2009		Phil Hardberger
June 1, 2009 – July 22, 2014		Julian Castro
July 22, 2014 – June 21, 2017		Ivy Taylor
June 21, 2017 – June 18, 2025		Ron Nirenberg
June 18, 2025 – present		Gina Ortiz Jones

== See also ==
- Timeline of San Antonio
