= Ángel Navarro =

Spanish settler and patriarch of San Antonio, Texas

Ángel Navarro (1748–1808) was a leading early Spanish settler and patriarch of San Antonio, New Philippines. The Navarro family played a prominent role in the Mexican and Texas revolutions. He was born in Corsica in 1748 and settled in Spanish Texas in 1769. Navarro was the seventy-second alcalde (mayor) of San Antonio under Spanish Texas.

He was the father of Texas statesman José Antonio Navarro, San Antonio alcalde José Ángel Navarro (elder), and the grandfather of Texas state legislator José Ángel Navarro III.

Ángel Navarro's daughter María Josefa Navarro married Juan Martín de Veramendi, the Governor of Coahuila y Tejas from 1832 to 1833. This couple's eldest daughter, Maria Ursula de Veramendi, was the wife of Texas revolutionary Jim Bowie.

According to census records, Navarro was an active participant in the slave trade. One of Navarro's slaves was Maria Gertrudis de la Peña, an Indigenous woman who sued for her freedom in 1785 in San Fernando de Béxar (San Antonio) on the basis that she could not be enslaved because Indigenous peoples were granted some of the same rights as Spanish people in New Spain where slavery was also illegal. During her ownership by Ángel Navarro she was known as "Escalava" (slave) and accused Navarro and his family of "many ill-treatments". Upon purchasing her, Navarro promised la Peña that she would be freed within three years, but la Peña sought her freedom before that due to "the temper and style of the household." She petitioned Texas Governor Domingo Cabello y Robles and was granted freedom after the Governor ruled that Spanish law "greatly favors the freedom of Indians".

Political offices
Preceded by Jose Antonio Saucedo	Alcalde of San Antonio, Texas; 1807–1808	Succeeded by Ignacio Perez
