= Botiller =

Botiller is a surname. Notable people with the surname include:

- Dick Botiller (1896–1953), American actor
- Dionisio Botiller (1842–1915), American politician

== See also ==
- Botiller v. Dominguez, a United States Supreme Court case
