= Salvador Rodríguez =

Salvador Rodríguez may refer to:

- Salvador Rodríguez (mayor), mayor of San Antonio, Texas, in 1785 and 1796
- Salvador Rodríguez (regidor), regidor of San Antonio, Texas
- Salvador Becerra Rodríguez (born 1946), Mexican politician
- Salvador Rodríguez (athlete) (born 1980), Spanish sprinter
- Salvador Rodríguez (footballer) (born 2001), Mexican footballer
