= José Ángel Navarro (elder) =

José Ángel Navarro (1784–1836), known as José Ángel Navarro (the elder), was born in San Antonio de Béxar and became a soldier under Spanish Texas. He was the son of Ángel Navarro, a brother to Texas statesman José Antonio Navarro, and an uncle to Texas legislator José Ángel Navarro III.

Navarro was two-term alcalde (mayor) of San Antonio in Spanish Texas. As alcalde, he was one of the seven community leaders to sign the December 19, 1832, Béxar Remonstrance, a petition to the Mexican government regarding what they felt was "the historic neglect of San Antonio in particular and Texas in general".

He died June 13, 1836, at his home.

Political offices
Preceded by Erasmo Seguín	Alcalde of San Antonio, Texas; 1821–1822	Succeeded by José María Salinas
Preceded by Juan Seguín	Alcalde of San Antonio, Texas; 1835–1836	Succeeded by Francisco Antonio Ruiz
