= Bryan Callaghan Jr. =

American mayor (1852–1912)

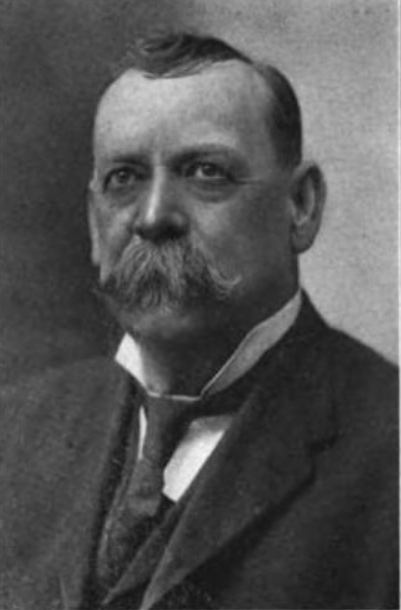

138th Mayor of San Antonio, Texas (1st time)
- In office 1885–1892
- Preceded by: James H. French
- Succeeded by: A. I. Lockwood (Pro Tem)

143rd Mayor of San Antonio (2nd time)
- In office 1897–1899
- Preceded by: Henry Elmendorf
- Succeeded by: Marshall Hicks

147th Mayor of San Antonio (3rd time)
- In office 1905–1912
- Preceded by: John P. Campbell
- Succeeded by: William L. Richter (Pro Tem)

Personal details
- Born: April 1, 1852 San Antonio, Texas, US
- Died: July 8, 1912 (aged 60) San Antonio, Texas, US
- Spouse: Adele Guilbeau
- Children: 7
- Education: University of Virginia (LLB)
- Profession: Politician, judge

Bryan V. Callaghan Jr. (April 1, 1852 – July 8, 1912) was a nine-term mayor of San Antonio, Texas. He was the son of former San Antonio mayor Bryan Callaghan Sr. and the father of future mayor Alfred Callaghan. He served from 1879 on as a city alderman, city recorder, mayor, and County Judge.

== Early life ==
Callaghan was born in San Antonio on April 1, 1852. His father, Bryan, was born in Ireland and moved to San Antonio in 1838. Callaghan Sr. served as mayor of San Antonio from 1847-49. His mother, Concepción Ramon, was a member of a local prominent family. The youngest child of the couple, Callaghan received an elementary education at St. Mary's Institute in San Antonio.

Following this, he was sent to study at the Lycée de Montpelier for five years in Montpellier, France. After returning to San Antonio, he took up a position as a guard for a West Texas stagecoach line owned by Peter Gallagher. He worked at this job for a few years before deciding to return to school, attending the University of Virginia. He graduated in 1874 with a Bachelor of Laws degree and moved back to San Antonio.

== Career ==
Callaghan's political service first began in 1879, when he was elected as an alderman in San Antonio. After four years as alderman, he became the city recorder in 1883. In 1885 he ran for his first term as mayor and won. Following three more re-elections, Callaghan resigned during his fourth term to run to be a county judge in Bexar County. In 1897, he returned to the mayoral office for his fifth term, but suffered his first and only electoral loss during his re-election campaign in 1899. After his loss, he returned to private law practice until 1905, when he was once more elected to be mayor. He served for three more terms as mayor before his death in 1912.

Overall, Callaghan served as mayor for a duration of 16 years over 9 terms of office. Callaghan helped to create a political machine in the city, with vote manipulation, favoritism, patronage, lenience towards gambling, and opposition to civil-service reform. He expanded city services, modernize the police and fire departments, and started major sewer and road paving operations. During his tenure, the park system was expanded and a new city hall and hospital were built.

== Personal life ==
In 1879, Callaghan married his first cousin Adele Guilbeau. Together the couple raised seven children, amongst these Alfred Callaghan. Alfred Callaghan would later also serve as mayor of San Antonio for one term from 1947 to 1949.

Callaghan was multilingual, fluent in English, Spanish, French, and German. He was known to give speeches in all of these languages, which helped his appeal to the many diverse voters in San Antonio. Callaghan died of chronic nephritis on July 8, 1912, and was buried in San Fernando Cemetery No. 1 in San Antonio.

== Legacy ==
Callaghan Avenue in Downtown San Antonio, Texas is named after him while Callaghan Road in Northwest San Antonio is named after his son, Alfred.
