= José Ángel Navarro III =

American politician

José Ángel Navarro III (1828–1876), also known as José Ángel Navarro (the younger), was born in San Antonio de Béxar to José Antonio Navarro and his wife Margarita de la Garza. He was a grandson of Ángel Navarro, who is sometimes found in historical records as José Ángel Navarro.

An 1850 graduate of Harvard Law School, Navarro later served in the Texas Instrument. Although Texas legislative records list him as José Ángel Navarro III, some historical references show him as José Ángel Navarro (younger) to distinguish him from his uncle José Ángel Navarro (elder). Navarro served as an elected representative in the Seventh, Eighth and Ninth Texas legislatures. During his service, he was a member of the committees on Education, Indian Affairs, Public Debt, Judiciary, Military Affairs, Private Land Claims and State Affairs. Navarro was also the chair of a committee charged with translating Spanish language documents into English.

Navarro's public service coincided with Sam Houston's term as Governor of Texas, during which Houston sent Navarro and state Senator Robert H. Taylor to conduct an investigation of the Cortina Troubles in the Rio Grande area. It was during the Eighth Texas Legislature that Texas joined with other Southern states in signing the Ordinance of Secession, and during which Houston was dismissed from office for his refusal to swear an allegiance to the Confederate States of America. Navarro, however, signed the ordinance for the House, and went on to serve in the Ninth legislature.

== Personal life ==
Navarro and his wife Concepción Ramón Callaghan were the parents of three children. He died in 1876.

Texas House of Representatives
| Preceded by Marcellus French | Member of the Texas House of Representatives from District 70 (San Antonio); 1859–1861 | Succeeded by Vacant until after 1863 |
| Preceded by Jacob Waelder | Member of the Texas House of Representatives from District 71 (San Antonio); 1861–1863 | Succeeded by Samuel Sampson |
