= Gaspar Flores de Abrego =

American politician

José Gaspar María Flores de Abrego

Mayor of San Antonio
- In office January 1811 – February 1811
- In office 1824–1825
- In office 1829–1830

Personal details
- Born: January 5, 1781 San Antonio de Béjar, Texas
- Died: September 6, 1836 (aged 55) Villa de San Fernando, San Antonio, Texas
- Spouse: Petra Zambrano
- Profession: land commissioner and mayor of San Antonio

José Gaspar Flores de Abrego (1781–1836) was a Tejano who served three terms as the mayor of San Antonio, Texas. He was also a land commissioner and associate of Austin's early colonists. Gaspar Flores was a member of a group opposing the dictatorial actions of the President of Mexico, Antonio Lopez de Santa Anna, and is known to have attended their first meeting in Bexar as well as the first revolutionary convention ever held in the city on November 15, 1834 (held by the anti-centralist opposition). He was one of the 35 men who signed the anti-Centralist document which was presented at the convention.

== Early life and family ==
José Gaspar María Flores de Abrego was born in San Antonio de Béjar as the son of Vicente Flores and Maria Antonia de las Fuentes Fernandes, descendants of Texas' first settlers, from the Canary Islands.

He was the great-grandson of the first alguacil mayor of San Antonio, Vicente Álvarez Travieso (1731–1779). In 1827, he was acting land commissioner for the Austin colony, issuing 35 land titles. He was elected as mayor of San Antonio in 1811, 1819, 1824, 1829, and 1834.

== Involvement in the Texas Revolution ==
Gaspar Flores attended the first meeting in Bexar and the first revolutionary convention ever held in the city on November 15, 1834. Flores was Treasury administrator in the 1830s and signed the anti-Centralist document which was presented at the convention.

In 1835, Santa Anna dissolved Congress and enforced his political power in all the state governments of Mexico, including Coahuila and Texas. When the Colonel Domingo Ugartechea with his troops arrived to San Antonio, Flores opposed the colonel's requirement and relinquish the Treasury's official documents.

Subsequently, Santa Anna sent other troop, led by General Martin Perfecto de Cos, to San Antonio to control the city. However, in December 1835 a group of Texians fought against them and expelled them from San Antonio and Texas during the siege of Bexar. Flores went to the aid of those who had decided to stay in Bexar after the battle, supplying them food, cattle and other goods. Taking advantage of the meeting of the Mexican soldiers with the residents of San Antonio in January 1836, Flores worked in a committee in order to elaborate possible resolutions to the conflict.

In February 1836, elections in Texas took place. Each city elected four delegates to represent them at the convention that would take place on the first of March; Gaspar Flores was one of the delegates chosen in Bexar, though José Antonio Navarro, José Francisco Ruiz and Erasmo Seguin all opposed him in the political race.

Two weeks later, Texas received information that Santa Anna was on its way to Texas to occupy San Antonio with several thousand troops. However, almost immediately after the town had heard the news young men joined the local militia or acted as messengers. After the fall of the Alamo, Flores and Seguin brought many families to eastern Texas, to protect them from conflict.

Flores died on September 6, 1836, after the battle of San Jacinto, having managed to go a few miles east of San Felipe. He probably died of a fever that struck the area.

He married twice. His second wife, Petra Zambrano, his son Nicholas, and his two sons-in-law were bequeathed his possessions on February 11, 1837.
