= José María de Letona =

Mexican politician (1799–1832)

10th Governor of Coahuila and Texas
- In office 5 April 1831 – 28 April 1831
- Preceded by: José María Viesca
- Succeeded by: José Rafael Eça y Múzquiz

12th Governor of Coahuila and Texas
- In office 10 May 1831 – 18 September 1832
- Preceded by: José Rafael Eça y Múzquiz
- Succeeded by: Juan Martín de Veramendi

Personal details
- Born: 1799
- Died: 18 September 1832 (aged 32–33) Saltillo, Coahuila, Mexico
- Profession: Political

José María de Letona (1799–1832) was governor of the Mexican state Coahuila and Texas in 1831 and 1832.

== Biography ==
Letona was born in 1799. He worked as a lawyer for a long time until he joined the revolt provoked by Miguel Hidalgo y Costilla in order to improve the social conditions of workers and abolish slavery. He collaborated in the revolt following orders from Gen. Mariano Jiménez. After the revolt, he worked as a legal advisor. As a resident of Saltillo, he served on the city's governing board, which proclaimed the so-called Plan of Iguala. Through this plan, the board defended the independence of Mexico.

Although he was appointed governor of Coahuila and Texas in January 1831, he did not officially take office until 5 April of that year. However, this period of government was brief, as it ended on the 28th of that same month, being succeeded by José Rafael Eça y Múzquiz. However, it would not be long before he returned to the position of governor, as on May 10 of the same year (1831) he assumed office again. He held this office until September of the following year.

During his dual administration in Coahuila and Texas, Letona oriented his policies toward issues related to the possession of lands of the state's inhabitants. The lawyer from Saltillo distrusted the Law of 6 April 1830, which cancelled or limited the settlement of Americans in the state, as well as the importation of slaves. Letona argued it was unconstitutional, so he sent land commissioner José Francisco Madero to Texas to investigate the titles of the properties that had been given to the settlers of the city of Trinidad, Texas. Madero measured and gave land to its residents. Letona also took into account the lands that the Cherokee were claiming as part of their original properties.

However, Letona was unable to complete his term as governor, as he died in Saltillo on 18 September 1832, and was replaced by Vice-Governor Juan Martín de Veramendi.
