= José Antonio de la Garza =

American mayor

79th and 99th Mayor of San Antonio
- In office 1813–1814
- Preceded by: Clemente Delgado
- Succeeded by: José Antonio Saucedo
- In office 1831–1832
- Preceded by: José María Salinas
- Succeeded by: José Miguel de Arciniega

Personal details
- Born: May 31, 1776 San Antonio de Béjar, Tejas, Viceroyalty of New Spain
- Died: 1851 (aged 74–75) San Antonio, Texas, U.S.
- Spouse: Maria Gertrudis de Jesus Rivas Irenaeus
- Profession: Landowner and politician

José Antonio de la Garza (May 31, 1776 – 1851?), was a Tejano who was the first landowner in San Antonio, Texas, and the first man to create a coin in the state. Antonio de la Garza was elected mayor of San Antonio in 1813 and 1832.

== Biography ==
=== Early years ===
Antonio de la Garza was born in San Antonio de Béjar, Texas, on May 31, 1776. His parents were Leonardo de la Garza and Magdalena Martinez. His ancestors came from Nuevo Leon (modern Mexico). In 1813, he became the first elected mayor of San Antonio.

=== The first coin in Texas ===
In 1818, after acquiring permission from the government of Texas, he created the first coin that existed in Texas. "On one side of the coin", de la Garza imprinted his initials "JAG" (José Antonio de la Garza) as well as, the year it was minted (1818). On the other side of the coin, he fixed a drawing of one star.

The importance of this event was not only the creation of the first coin of Texas, but also that the star symbol drawn in the currency is said to have served of inspiration to the symbol of modern State of Texas, the "Lone Star."

De la Garza used a building located between the Houston and Soledad streets for the minting of coins. He minted them for a year and a half.

=== Landowner ===
In 1824, thanks to the success of its currency, de la Garza obtained a large extension of land (which consisted of two leagues) between San Antonio and Medina River. In doing so, he "became one of the largest landowners in Bexar County".

=== Mayor ===
In 1832, de la Garza became Mayor of San Antonio. That year he signed the articles from the Convention of 1832. Probably at the beginning of 1834 he bought the San Francisco de la Espada Mission. This purchase, however, was deemed illegal by some residents, leading to a rejection of him. This rejection was further strengthened when during the Texas Revolution (1835-1836), some Texas residents thought that his family defended the idea that Texas should remain Mexican (Texas was a province of Mexico previous to the Revolution).

In the 1840s, de la Garza and his family settled near Calaveras Lake. Their house there, "a two-story structure", had been built forty years earlier (1801) and had three functions: as a church, a school and a community centre.

== Personal life ==
José Antonio de la Garza married Maria Gertrudis de Jesus Rivas Irenaeus on October 21, 1813, at "La Villa de San Fernando de Béjar". They had 3 children; Carmen, Vicente and Rafael. Later, on July 20, 1824, he married María Josefa Menchaca and they had four children. One of his sons, Leonardo Garza, became a banker, business owner, and one of the wealthiest citizens of Bexar County in his time. De la Garza died on May 5, 1851, in San Antonio, according to the State of Texas Bulletin.

== Legacy ==
In 1876 Garza County was named after the family of José Antonio de la Garza, which lived in San Antonio for more than two hundred years.
