= Juan Leal =

Spanish settler and politician

Juan Leal Goraz

1st Mayor of San Antonio, Texas (1st term)
- In office 1731–1732
- Succeeded by: Antonio de los Santos

4th Mayor of San Antonio (2nd term)
- In office 1735–1735
- Preceded by: Manuel de Niz
- Succeeded by: Antonio de los Santos

Personal details
- Born: 1676 Teguise, Lanzarote, (Canary Islands)
- Died: March 1742 (aged 65–66) San Antonio de Béjar, Spanish Texas, New Spain (now San Antonio, Texas, U.S.)
- Spouse: Lucía (Catarina) Hernández · María Melano
- Profession: councilor and Mayor

Juan Leal Goraz (1676–1742 or 1743), also called Juan Leal Gonzal, was a Spanish settler and politician who served as the first alcalde (a municipal magistrate with both judicial and administrative functions) of La Villa de San Fernando, which later would become the city of San Antonio, Texas. A native of the Canary Islands, Leal went to San Antonio in 1731 leading a group of settlers from the Canary Islands to populate this municipality, founded by the Spanish government under the sponsorship of King Philip V. Leal had asserted himself as the Canarian emigrants' leader and spokesman since they left the islands. He served as alcade of San Antonio between 1731 and 1732, and again in 1735.

== Early life and first actions as leader of the new settlers ==
Juan Leal was born in 1676 in the city of Teguise, in Lanzarote (Canary Islands). He was the son of Antonio Goraz and Maria Perez and became a councilor of the municipality of Teguise. He lived in the village of San Bartolomé, on the same island.

In 1730, the Spanish Crown decided to send ten or eleven families from the Canary Islands as emigrants to Villa de San Fernando because of a supposed threat to Spanish interests by the French in Louisiana. Leal was the first Canarian councilor to respond, and agreed to enlist seven families of the ten more needed for the enterprise.

In Santa Cruz, the capital of Tenerife, Bartolomé de Casabuena, Superintendent of the Court of the Indies in the Canary Islands, appointed the oldest male among the chosen settlers, which happened to be Leal, as their leader. He accepted the assignment. On March 27, 1730, Leal, along with his own and the other Canarian families, departed from Santa Cruz on the frigate Santísima Trinidad y Nuestra Señora del Rosario, headed for Veracruz, via Havana. The first impression that the Canarians, who were unaccustomed to sea travel, had of their transport was that the ship was very small for such a long voyage. When many in the group panicked from fear and confusion, Leal's calm demeanor reassured them, and helped them endure a passage on rough seas across the Atlantic. This was the first indication of his natural ability as a leader, although not all his decisions were at first accepted by every one of the Canarian settlers. The group eventually came to the mutual conclusion that they needed a leader to choose a course of action to address any problems.

The settler group arrived in Havana on May 10 and were greeted by its governor, who had been made aware of their impending arrival by a letter from Bartolomé de Casabuena at Tenerife. Here they remained for several weeks and were given food and clothing. On July 9 they embarked on the ship Santísima Trinidad y Nuestra Señora del Rosario for Veracruz, where they landed on July 19 and remained for thirteen days. The alcalde of Veracruz greeted them on behalf of the Viceroy of New Spain, Juan de Acuña, and ordered horses and mules and wagons, and a guide called Francisco Duval to be made available to them. Continuing their journey overland, they reached Cuautitlán Izcalli, a town northwest of Mexico City, on August 27, 1730, where they received food, shelter, and clothing. Leal went to Mexico City for an audience with the viceroy to request better transportation and tools. Viceroy Acuña committed to providing more resources for the trip, and issued letters of introduction instructing the Governor of Texas and the Captain of the Presidio of San Antonio to assist the Canarians in building the new cabildo.

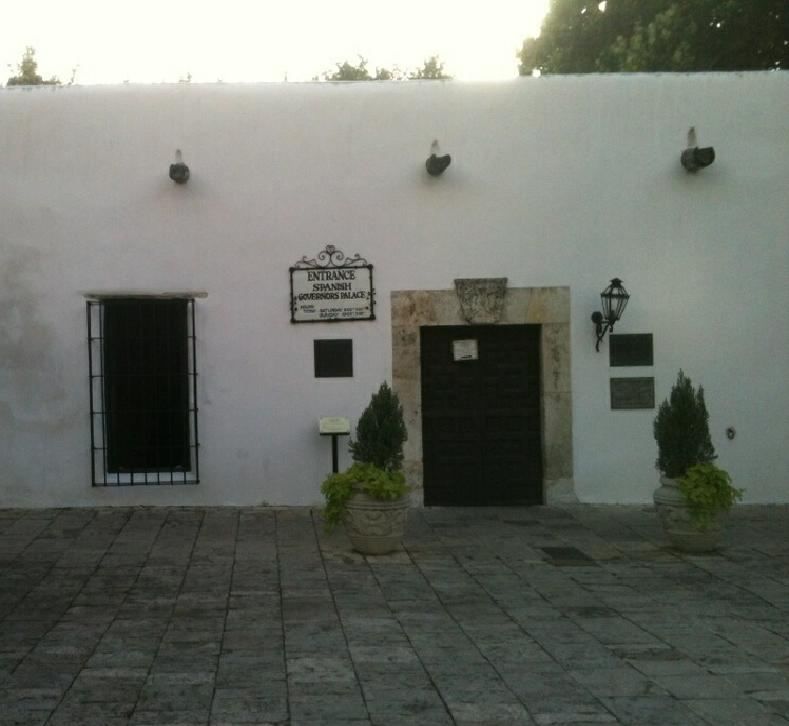
Presidio San Antonio de Bexar, San Antonio (Texas).

After the arrival of the settlers' caravan at San Luis de Potosí on November 14, 1730, Leal told the alcalde of the city that four Canarian men had abandoned the caravan and fled. The alcalde sent soldiers in pursuit, and they were arrested several days later and imprisoned at San Luis. The alcalde told Leal that if he would agree to be responsible for them, he would release the deserters to his custody. Leal accepted his proposal. The fact that Juan Leal led the four Canarians in handcuffs back to the caravan and did not respond to them while they were incarcerated at San Luis was the source of many problems that divided the Canarian families once they were established in San Antonio. Many days after this, Juan Leal gave a loan to the fugitives, who were not returned until later, when Juan Leal forced them.

After passing through many other towns and cities, the settlers finally reached the Presidio of San Antonio on the morning of March 9, 1731, after eight months of travel in a caravan and almost a year since they had left the port of Santa Cruz de Tenerife for Texas. Leal was 54 years old.

== Mayor of San Antonio ==
On August 31, 1731, Leal was elected alcalde (mayor) and regidor of the city. Since departing from Tenerife, he had been the group's leader. Once the Canarian people established themselves in the city, Leal found they had problems, including frequent clashes with the Franciscan missionaries of San Antonio and the soldiers stationed at the presidio. The Franciscans were opposed to the Canarians settling in the middle of an area where they had already established their domain and that they regarded as belonging to them.

Given these considerations and his investment in his own decision to settle in Texas, Leal traveled from San Antonio to Mexico to speak to the viceroy and request that the appropriate orders be given to the Captain of the presidio, Almazan, and thus ensure that the Cabildo (council) constituted by the new settlers in Texas had the greater power in the matter and the Canarian settlers would be enabled to succeed in their mission. He also requested necessary instructions on how to administer the council. The viceroy, again assisted by Brigadier Rivera, sent clear orders to the captain of the presidio to recognize and respect the will of the council. Leal succeeded in establishing the new colony and the city was populated with new families.

During Leal's administration, the settlers twice requested that the viceroy assign Native Americans working in the Spanish missions to farm their lands (whether they were willing or not). The settlers maintained that missionaries should engage in ecclesiastical functions only and forego entering trade or enlarging their farm lands, since they were trained as clerics, and should not compete with the farmers in either endeavor. The viceroy, however, rejected both their requests. The following year, 1733, Leal completed his term as alcade of San Antonio and was replaced by Antonio de los Santos.

In 1735, Leal was appointed as town councilman, and soon after was appointed to a life term as alcalde. Leal was not considered either tolerant or judicious by many among the military, the clergy, and the settlers themselves, and soon gained their general contempt. Consequently, his second term as mayor lasted only a year and he was replaced again by Antonio de los Santos.

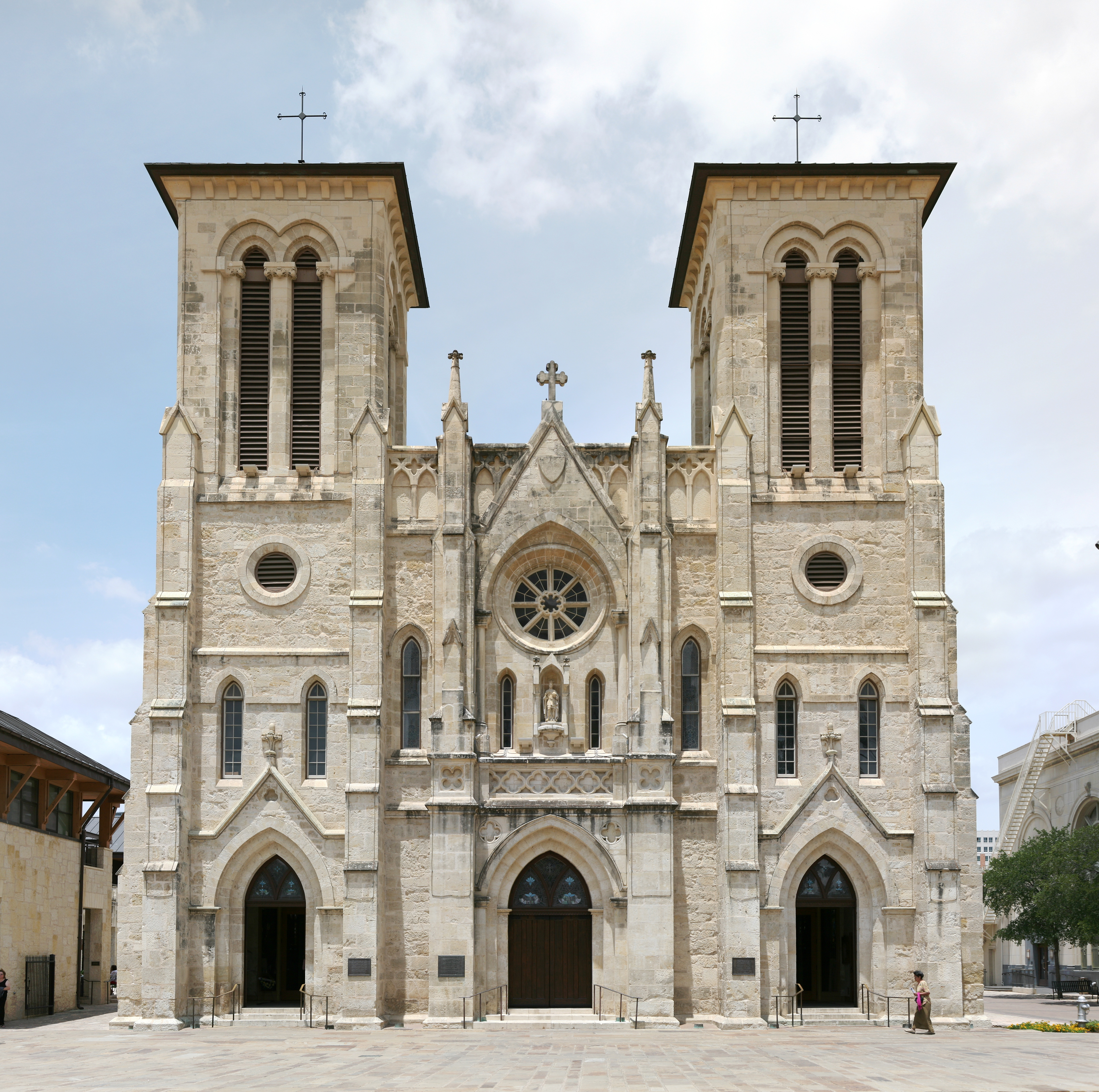
Juan Leal is buried in the San Fernando Cathedral, main Plaza, Cathedral, and Court House of colonial San Antonio

Although Leal's administration seems to have been successful, he had clashes with other Canarians in Texas. The first of the Canarians with whom he had problems was Mayor Alguacil Vicente Álvarez Travieso, from whom he was to reclaim a loan in court when they arrived in Coahuila. Leal had made a loan to Travieso in San Luis Potosí, and Travieso had not repaid him by the deadline. This circumstance and the distribution of land lots (Juan Leal had chosen the last one and therefore the worst one) in the city was a trigger for a series of lawsuits and claims against other families like the Traviesos, the Curvelos, the Padróns, and the Santos. These events occurred between 1732 and 1735.

== Later years ==
Juan Leal Goraz died in the Villa de San Fernando in March 1742 or 1743 in San Antonio, Texas. He was buried in the Campo Santo of the Cathedral of San Fernando.

== Personal life ==
According to the Our Lady of the Lake University, Leal married Lucía (Catarina) Hernández in his native Lanzarote, and they had five children: Juan "El Mozo" (born 1700), José (born 1708), Catalina (1714–1794), Bernardo (1717–1751) and Vicente Leal, but Lucia, exhausted by the rigors of the long journey to San Antonio, became ill and died, as did many other Canarians.

Leal then married María Melano, who bore him three children: Juan Leal Goraz, Jr., Bernardo and Catrina Leal. His son, José Leal, was mayor of San Antonio in 1748. Currently, some of their descendants still live in San Antonio, as in the case of John O. Leal, historian and president of the Canary Islands Descendants Association of San Antonio, Texas. A descendant of Juan Leal was a Bexar County's archivist at the end of the 20th century.
