= Ignacio Lorenzo de Armas =

Spanish politician

7th Mayor of San Antonio, Texas (1st term)
- Incumbent
- Assumed office 1738
- Preceded by: Juan Curbelo
- Succeeded by: Juan Delgado

30th Mayor of San Antonio, Texas (2nd term)
- In office 1906–Unknown
- Preceded by: Luis Antonio Menchaca
- Succeeded by: Bernabé de Carbajal

Personal details
- Born: 1706 San Sebastián de La Gomera, Canary Islands, Kingdom of Spain
- Died: unknown San Antonio, Tejas, Viceroyalty of New Spain
- Spouse: Ana Cabrera
- Profession: Mayor

Ignacio Lorenzo de Armas (1706 – unknown) was a Spanish politician who served as mayor of San Antonio, Texas in 1738 and 1764. His family arrived in San Antonio from the Canary Islands in 1731 with other Canarian families in order to populate this region.

== Biography ==
Juan Ignacio Lorenzo de Armas was born about 1706, in San Sebastián de La Gomera, Canary Islands. His parents were Roque Lorenzo De Armas and Teresa De Aviles. He had a brother, Martin Lorenzo de Armas, who was younger than him and also settled in San Antonio. In 1731, when he was 22 years old, his family arrived in San Antonio with other families from the Canary Islands to settle this unpopulated region,.

In 1738 and 1764 De Armas was named mayor of San Antonio, replacing mayors Juan Curbelo and Luis Antonio Menchaca respectively.

De Armas married another local Canarian, Ana Cabrera, with whom he had two children.
