= Juan Curbelo (Texan settler) =

Spanish politician

6th Mayor of San Antonio
- In office 1737–1737
- Monarch: Philip V
- Preceded by: Antonio de los Santos
- Succeeded by: Ignacio Lorenzo de Armas

8th Mayor of San Antonio
- In office 1739–1739
- Monarch: Philip V
- Preceded by: Ignacio Lorenzo de Armas
- Succeeded by: Juan Delgado

Personal details
- Born: 1680 Lanzarote, Canary Islands
- Died: January 26, 1760 (aged 79–80) San Fernando de Béxar, Texas
- Spouse: Gracia Perdomo y Umpienres

Juan Curbelo (1680–1760) was a Spanish politician who served as the sixth and eighth mayor of San Antonio, Texas, in 1737 and 1739. His family arrived in San Antonio from the Canary Islands in 1731 with other Canarian families to populate the region.

== Biography ==
Juan Curbelo was born in 1680 in Lanzarote, Canary Islands, Spain, and was son of Domingo Curbelo y María Martín Enríquez. He arrived in San Fernando de Béxar, Texas (present-day San Antonio) in 1731. In 1737 and 1739, he served one-year terms as mayor of the community. He married Gracia Perdomo y Umpienres. Juan Curbelo and his wife had five children: José, Juan Francisco (born in La Palma, Canary Islands), Mariana (born in Lanzarote), Juana and María Curbelo. He died in 1760 in La Villa de San Fernando (San Antonio) de Béxar.

His son José was mayor of San Antonio three times: 1746, 1751 and 1757. His daughter Maria Ana married alguacil Vicente Álvarez Travieso and his granddaughter Maria Jesusita Curbelo married the future mayor of San Antonio (between the 1830s and 1840s), John William Smith.
