= Simón de Arocha =

Tejano militia commander and alcalde

37th Mayor of San Antonio (1st term)
- In office 1770–1770
- Preceded by: Francisco Flores de Abrego
- Succeeded by: José Félix Menchaca

53rd Mayor of San Antonio, Texas (2nd term)
- Incumbent
- Assumed office 1928
- Preceded by: Juan José de la Santa
- Succeeded by: José Félix Menchaca

Personal details
- Born: October 1731 San Antonio de Béxar, Texas
- Died: July 29, 1796 (aged 64) Villa de San Fernando, San Antonio, Texas
- Occupation: Judge presiding over the distribution of public lands and mayor of San Antonio de Béxar

Simón de Arocha (1731–1796) was a Tejano cowboy, militia commander, and alcalde (a municipal magistrate who had both judicial and administrative functions) of San Antonio de Béxar (1770 and 1787). Like his father, who had been city clerk and public notary, Simón and his brothers became leaders in the province.

== Biography ==
Simón de Arocha was born in San Antonio de Béxar, Texas, in October, 1731. His parents, Francisco de Arocha and Juana Curbelo, came from La Palma, one of the Canary Islands of Spain. They had arrived at San Antonio in March of the same year with a group of Canarian settlers. Simón was the oldest of fifteen children. His father held important administrative positions in San Antonio. In his youth, Simón joined the local militia, and rose through the ranks to become its commander with the rank of lieutenant general. Eventually, he was appointed as a judge to distribute public lands among the Isleño community in San Antonio. He also served as alcalde of San Antonio in 1770 and 1787. Between the years of his service as alcalde Arocha served in other capacities: in 1774 he was appointed lieutenant governor of Béxar province over the objections of the cabildo's sheriff and perhaps most of the local ranchers, and escorted the Adaesaños (also descendants of Spanish settlers), who were residents in Los Adaes, to the new settlement of Bucareli on the Trinity River; in 1778 he prepared a census report on the province for the new commanding general, Fray Juan Agustín Morfi. Four year later, in 1782, Simón and his brother Juan de Arocha obtained title to a ranch north of Floresville, and their families became leaders of the local ranching community. Simón played an important role in organizing a cattle roundup with the Spanish missions in 1787. He and his family subsequently gained almost complete control of the city council of San Antonio. When Simón tried to buy another ranch at the confluence of the San Marcos and Guadalupe rivers, many ranchers in the province protested, with the support of Governor Rafael Martínez Pacheco. The furor following this protest caused the governor to lose his position. Simón de Arocha died on July 29, 1796.

== After his death ==
Most of the Arocha family's lands were confiscated in the early 19th century during the revolutionary uprisings in the Spanish colony of New Spain, of which they were active participants. With the winning of Mexican independence in 1821, Simón's grandson was able to reconfirm the title to his grandfather's Spanish land grant.

== Personal life ==
In 1752, Simón de Arocha married María Ignacia de Urrutia; they had eight children.
