= Jose Miguel de Arciniega =

Mexican military explorer and legislator

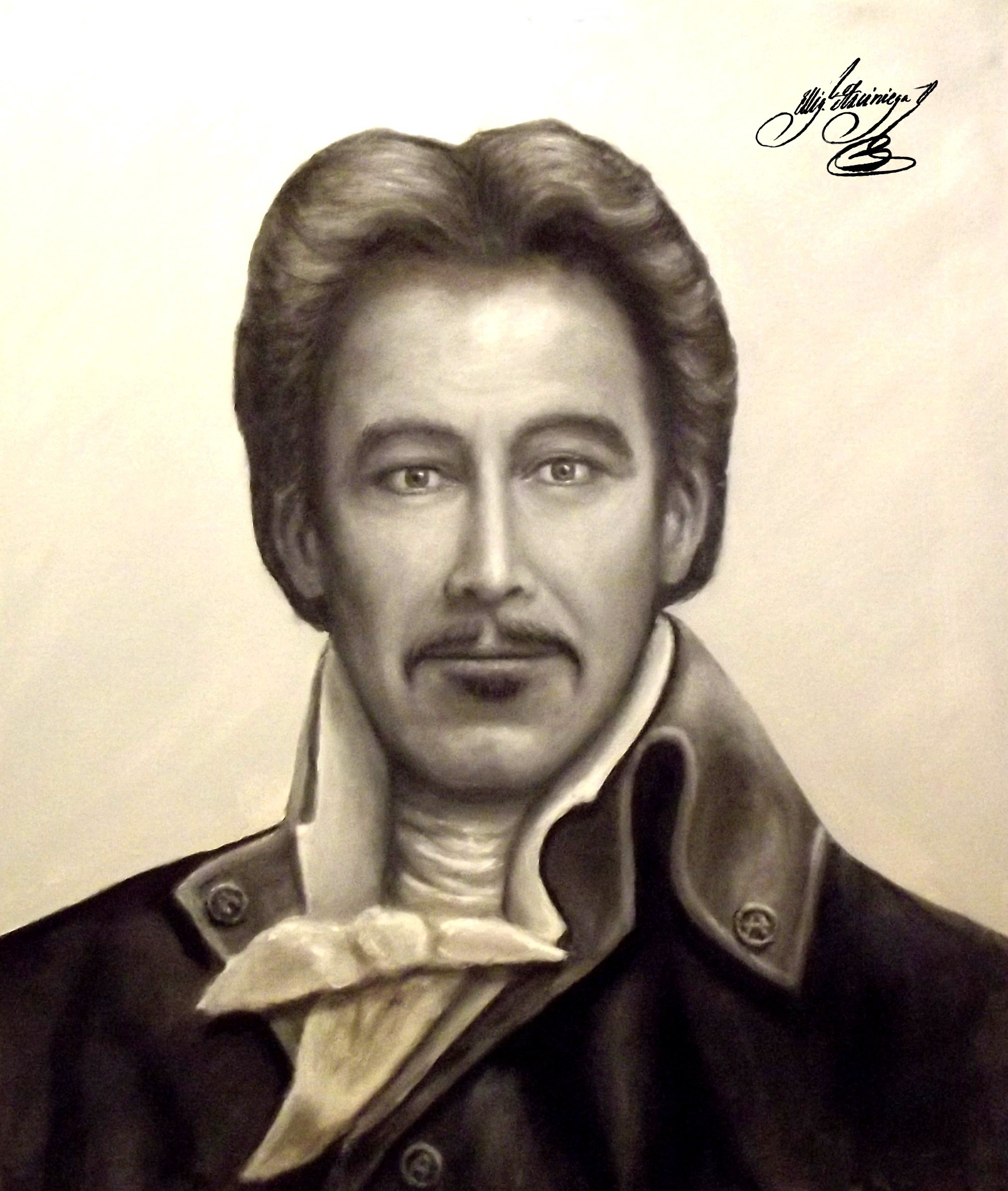

Personal details
- Born: 1793 Coahuila, New Spain
- Died: May 13, 1849 (aged 55–56) San Antonio, Texas
- Occupation: Military explorer and legislator

Jose Miguel de Arciniega (1793–1849) was a Mexican military explorer and legislator. He was mayor of San Antonio, Texas, in 1830 and 1833.

== Biography ==
=== Early years ===
He was born in Coahuila, New Spain, to Jose Gregorio Arciniega and Maria Josefa Flores de Abrego. He married Maria Alejandra Lasoya on January 25, 1825, and had ten children. Jose Miguel's father and his uncle, Felipe Arciniega were mounted lancers in the Second Flying Company of San Carlos de Parras. The name of their Spanish regiment was Alamo de Parras. They traveled from the pueblo San Jose y Santiago de Alamo, near Las Parras, Coahuila to La Villa de San Fernando, present-day San Antonio. Their assignment was to secure the Louisiana; United States borders in order to keep the Americans out of Texas, and to stop the livestock smuggling.

This regiment was the only protection that Texas had. The United States insisted the Louisiana border extended to the Rio Grande taking the Gulf of Mexico's ports from Spain. King Carlos IV disagreed and sent his seasoned mounted lancers from the garrison of Alamo de Parras to protect Texas from being taken over. The mounted lancers of Alamo de Parras were also commissioned to stop the Indian raids from penetrating the Interior Provinces of New Spain, in turn the soldiers were able to start a settlement, become merchants, civil workers, ranchers and farmers. The barracks for the presidio soldiers were in ruins leaving the mounted lancers to live in the Alamo with their families. Jose Miguel was only nine years old when he went to live in the Alamo. He lived in the Alamo until he turned seventeen years old when his father Gregorio had retired for serving thirty-two years in the Spanish regime. In 1811, Gregorio received a Spanish land grant in the center of present-day San Antonio. The San Antonio Mission's name was changed to the Alamo because of this Spanish regiment; Alamo de Parras.

Jose Miguel de Arciniega was the third Arciniega generation as a mounted lancer. His son, Jose Miguel Cristoval also became a mounted lancer, making him the fourth generation. Jose Miguel was a mounted lancer from 1810 to 1836. The Second Flying Company of San Carlos de Parras disband in 1836 after the formation of the Republic of Texas. Within these years, Jose Miguel was an emissary for Spain and captain of a military exploratory party. By the year 1819 there were still French settlers in Louisiana living among Anglos. Jose Miguel was linguistic. He was assigned as a secret agent by Spain to gather information on the whereabouts and the movements of both enemies of Spain; France and the United States making it essential for Jose Miguel to be fluent in Spanish, English and French. Jose Miguel also had fluency in several different dialects of native Indians.

Moses Austin made a contract with Spain to colonize southeast Texas, however, he died before he could start his venture in colonization. His successor was his son, Stephen F. Austin, who came to Texas at the end of the Mexican revolutionary war. Austin was disappointed to find that his father's contract to colonized was null and void after Spain no longer had jurisdiction over New Spain, now Mexico. Austin continued on with his quest with Mexico, and renegotiated a contract that lasted for almost two years to colonize the first “Old 300” families in southeast Texas in 1823.

Jose Miguel Arciniega fought in the Mexican revolutionary war with his father Gregorio Arciniega and uncle Felipe Arciniega. The people of Texas, Mexico, had to build their newly won motherland. The state of Coahuila and the state of Texas were joined together as one state. Texas was now Coahuila and Texas. Coahuila and Texas was an untamed frontier land. Throughout many years of wars, skirmishes, and Indian deprivations, the land needed to be settled throughout. The Tejanos did not have the money to restore their new state and country. The continuous Indian raids made it difficult to colonize Coahuila and Texas. Jose Miguel had been commissioned by the Mexican Supreme Government to have peace talks with the hostile Native Indians to promote peace with the Indians so they could all live together.

=== Career as a politician ===
On October 21, 1822 Jose Felix Trespalacios was the Political chief for the Province of Texas and a veteran as a revolutionary leader for the Mexican movement for independence against Spain. Trespalacios opened the first “Banco Nacional de Texas”. This was the first chartered bank west of the Mississippi. Councilman Jose Miguel Arciniega, Councilman Vicente Travieso, Alcalde (Mayor) Jose Salinas and Trespalacios had to sign the currency in order for it to become legal tender. Jose Miguel launched his career as a governmental and political leader for Mexico from this time. Jose Miguel's father died in 1822 from a tooth infection and Jose Miguel inherited his father, Gregorio's property in downtown San Antonio.

In 1823, Jose Miguel was a legislator for the State of Coahuila and Texas. He served with Felipe Enrique Neri also known as the Baron de Bastrop who was Jose Miguel's dear friend, fellow legislator, and next door neighbor. The Baron was instrumental to the formation of Texas as it is today. The Baron spoke on behalf of Moses Austin to the Spanish government to approve his contract. When Moses died the Baron of Bastrop continued to assist Stephen Austin and diligently served Texas a short time as Austin's land commissioner and legislator for the State of Coahuila and Texas until his death in Saltillo, on February 23, 1827. Jose Miguel served from 1828 and again in 1829 with Jose Antonio Navarro.

In 1826 Arciniega was ordered to have peace talks with Chief Richard Fields of the Cherokee Indians. He was then sent to the Las Lagunas de Gallinas to continue his mission to have peace talks with the Comanche, Tahuallaces, Tejas and Caddo Indians. It took Miguel from January 21 to June 15, 1826, to complete this mission.

In 1830 Jose Miguel was appointed Land commissioner for Austin's colonies by the Mexican Supreme Government Jose Miguel had the authority vested in to him by the Mexican Supreme government in conformity with the Colonization Law of March 24, 1825, in Article 11 and Article 34 to establish a new town to serve as a seat in the Austin's colony. In 1832 Jose Miguel Arciniega was the founder of the Town of Bastrop. He named this town in memory of his longtime friend and fellow legislator, the Baron de bastrop. Samuel May Williams served as Austin's secretary who wrote the title for the Town of Bastrop out as Williams did with all of Austin's land title. Williams wrote them out for Jose Miguel to validate them. Samuel P. Brown was the surveyor of the four league town. Arciniega served as the public treasurer, political chief, judge, captain of the militia, general inspector of arms, and Alcalde of San Antonio in 1830 and 1833. He assisted Austin to convince the Tejano Leaders in San Antonio to side with Austin in the convention of 1833 to separate Texas from Coahuila.

It was in this year that Jose Miguel wrote a letter to State Representative, Juan Vicente Campos requesting that Compos would present Jose Miguel's proposal with the support of Francisco Xavier Bustillos, Ignacio Chaves, Jose Flores, Jose Maria de Cardenas to place Maritime Customs Houses; one at the Bay of San Bernardo, one at the port of Galveston, and a land check point at the border with Nacogdoches hoping to populate these areas. Custom houses and the check point were to stop pirates, and contraband from coming in and to increase the commerce for Coahuila and Texas in the import and export industries within a few years.

From 1832 to 1835 Jose Miguel was approved by the Mexican Supreme Government to purchased 11 leagues of land that is equivalent to 48,703 acres of land in the neutral land or buffer zone between Northern Texas and Louisiana's US border. The 48,703 acres of lands were split up in present-day Hunt, Grayson, and Harrison Counties in northern Texas and in Natchitoches, Louisiana. He raised goats and had many forests along a canyon by the Sabine River, Red River and south of Lake Sciodo.

On December 11, 1835, Jose Miguel was appointed by General Martin Perfecto de Cos to be his interpreter for the Capitulation between him and General Edward Burleson after the Siege of Bexar was won by the Texians and the Tejanos who supported the Texians. Jose Miguel continued to serve in the military for the Republic of Texas with his son Jose Miguel Cristoval. Jose Miguel's son, Jose Miguel Cristoval served under Juan Seguin's company in 1839. Jose Miguel was very active during the Republic of Texas era and served as a probate and an associate judge, Bexar County Commissioner, Alderman, secured the borders at the Rio Grande under the instructions of President David G. Burnet, and was a well-known lifelong merchant of sugarcane, potatoes and corn. He made and sold carts for horses.

In 1846 during the Mexican War and the Annexation of the Republic of Texas to become Texas, United States, Arciniega secured the Rio Grande border for United States as a Captain. On May 13, 1849, Arciniega died an untimely death at the age of fifty-six only a few blocks from his home in downtown San Antonio. His exact final resting place is unknown. He is in the vicinity of the hallowed ground of the old Campo Santo Cemetery; currently, under Benjamin Milam Park and the Santa Ana Hospital in San Antonio, Texas.

== Legacy ==
There is an unfinished fountain on the west side of the park that was built in the 1990s by the City of San Antonio. The face of the fountain has a summary of the history and a long list inscribed of the Tejano residents of San Antonio who were laid to rest in what used to be Campo Santo Cemetery. At this present day they are still underneath the downtown Benjamin Milam Park and the Santa Rosa Hospital. Jose Miguel Arciniega, Gregorio Arciniega, Maria Petra Arciniega, Mateo Arciniega along with hundreds more names can be visited at the Benjamin Milam Park, San Antonio, TX.

His descendants from the Jose Miguel Arciniega Descendants Society, (JMADS) named his first home the Arciniega House on his birthday September 22, 2013; presently still standing on the corner of Arciniega Street and South Presa Street; in the historic gardens of the Plaza Hotel & Spa an Autograph Collection Hotel. He and his father, Gregorio Arciniega, built the small house in 1811. JMADS has installed a Texas Historical Marker on May 15, 2015, in front of his home for his loyalty and dedication to Texas. Arciniega is commemorated as a Maker of Texas by the Texas Historical Commission. On November 6, 2015, JMADS unveiled a portrait of Arciniega in the Texas State Capital. He can also be seen inside his home on Arciniega Street, in the South Campus of San Jacinto College in Houston, TX, and Meador Elementary School in Houston, TX where he validated land grants for Stephen F. Austin's coastal colony as the land commissioner. His portrait is also displayed in the Town of Bastrop Museum. Arciniega's portraits were painted by a lifelong artist, David Baisden, from Houston, TX.
