= Salvador Rodríguez (mayor) =

Spanish politician

Salvador Rodrígez was a Spanish politician who served as the fifty-first and sixty-first mayor of San Antonio, Texas in 1785 and 1796, replacing to mayors Francisco Javier Rodríguez and Ramón de las Fuentes respectively.
