= Dionisio Botiller =

American politician

Member of the Los Angeles Common Council
- In office June 1868 – January 20, 1870

Personal details
- Born: October 9, 1842 Pueblo de Los Ángeles
- Died: October 11, 1915 (aged 73) Los Angeles, California

Dionisio Botiller or Dionisio de Botiller (1842–1915) was a Californio politicians, who served as a member of the Los Angeles Common Council, the governing body of the city, in June 1868, December 1868 and in 1869, as well as the city auditor for eight years. He was also the owner of extensive property within the city of Los Angeles, California.

== History ==
The Botiller Californio family had settled in Spanish colonial Las Californias province in the 18th century, living near the pueblo of Santa Barbara. Dionisio was born Oct. 9, 1842 in an adobe structure in the Pueblo de Los Ángeles in Mexican Alta California, near present-day Fourth and Main Streets in Downtown Los Angeles.

He had nine siblings, including brothers Plutarcho Reyes Botiller of Los Angeles, who died in September 1906, Felipe Botiller and Brigido Botiller defendant in Supreme Court case Botiller vs. Dominguez, also of Los Angeles.

Botiller was elected a member of the Los Angeles Common Council, the governing body of the city in June 1868. He was re-elected in December 1868 and in 1869, and resigned on January 20, 1870, after which he became the city auditor for eight years. He was also the owner of much property within the city.

Dionisio died on October 11, 1915, in his residence at 1531 West Ninth Street (now James M. Wood Boulevard) in Los Angeles, California.
