= Juan Martín de Veramendi =

Spanish and Mexican politician

Juan Martin de Veramendi

6th Governor of Coahuila and Texas
- In office 1831–1833
- Preceded by: José María de Letona
- Succeeded by: José Francisco Vidaurri y Villaseñor

92nd and 95th Mayor of San Antonio
- In office 1825–1826
- In office 1828–1829

Personal details
- Born: December 17, 1778 San Antonio de Béjar, Spanish Texas, Viceroyalty of New Spain (now Texas, U.S.)
- Died: September 7, 1833 (aged 54) Monclova, Coahuila, Mexico
- Spouse: Josefa Navarro
- Profession: Politician

Juan Martin de Veramendi (December 17, 1778–1833) was a Spanish (1778-1821, Mexican independence) and Mexican (1821–1833) politician who served as governor of the Mexican state of Coahuila y Tejas from 1832 until 1833. Veramendi was also collector of foreign revenue (in Bexar in 1822–1823), alternate deputy of the Texas Provincial Depuration to the Mexican National Constituent Congress, alcalde of Bexar (1824, 1825 and 1828) and Vice Governor (in Coahuila y Tejas province on September 6, 1830).

== Personal life ==
Veramendi was born on December 17, 1778, in San Antonio de Béxar, known as Béxar, which was then a part of Spanish Texas. He was the second son of Fernando Veramendi, a native of Pamplona, Spain, who had come to Béxar by 1775, and María Josefa Granados, a native of Béxar.

Fernando was a merchant. He owned four tracts of irrigated land as well as a stone house on Soledad Street, "one of the more substantial homes" in the town. Fernando Veramendi was killed in an Indian attack in May 1783, leaving his property to be divided between his children, José Maria, Juan Martín, and Fernando Ramon . Another child, daughter María Josefa, was born soon after Fernando's death.

Per the terms of his father's will, Juan Martín Veramendi and his brothers were under the oversight of Father Pedro Fuentes, who would see to their education, and Juan José de la Santa, who would oversee the property. His mother soon remarried, to Spaniard Juan Martin de Amondarain. By 1790, María Josefa Granados had died and Father Fuentes had left the area, leaving Amondarain to raise the children.

In 1810, Juan Martín Veramendi married María Josefa Navarro, the sister of his good friend José Antonio Navarro. Their first child, Ursula, arrived in October 1811, and they had six other children together. Veramendi and his wife also raised their goddaughter, Juana Navarro, daughter of José Navarro and Concepción Cervantes. This couple's eldest daughter, Maria Ursula de Veramendi, was the wife of Texas revolutionary Jim Bowie.

== Career ==
By 1801, Veramendi had taken sole ownership of the family home and had embarked on a career as a merchant. The 1804 census shows Veramendi living with one of his brothers, his sister, and a five-year-old slave girl. He was listed as a notary, which implied some education in crafting legal documents. Four years later, he was appointed the sindico-procurador for the ayuntamiento, meaning he had authority to enforce the rules of the ayuntamiento. He continued trading goods, and also developed a ranch along Cibolo Creek, where he raised cattle, sheep, and goats.

The Mexican War of Independence broke out in 1810, and while most of the fighting was in the interior, two separate revolts took place in Texas. In early 1811, Juan Bautista de las Casas led a revolt in Béxar, overthrowing local authorities. Veramendi joined other prominent men in the area in plotting a counterrevolt; they successfully captured de las Casas on March 3. For his efforts, Veramendi received public commendation from General Nemesio Salcedo. The following year, Veramendi led a trading caravan, carrying his wool to export. His mules and the wool were confiscated in east Texas by the Gutiérrez–Magee Expedition, which intended to fight the Spanish authorities in Texas. While the expedition moved south to capture Presidio La Bahia and Béxar, Veramendi travelled to Natchitoches, Louisiana, where he remained. There, he loaned money to either Jean Lafitte or his brother Pierre.

Spanish forces under General José Joaquín de Arredondo soon quelled the rebellion in Texas, and Arredondo swept Béxar looking for traitors to punish. In October, Arredondo issued a general pardon and amnesty, which explicitly excluded Veramendi and his friend Francisco Ruiz (who had fought alongside the rebels), who were named as leaders of the rebellion. A 250-peso reward was offered for Veramendi's death. His home was confiscated and given to several army officers. In March 1814, Veramendi secured a partial pardon for himself and his younger brother Fernando; they were allowed to return to Mexico provided they agreed to remain under surveillance. Veramendi journeyed to Monterrey to speak with Arredondo. Following that conversation, Arredondo dismissed all charges against Veramendi and authorized the return of his property.

Several years later, as the civil war in Mexico continued, there were further reports that foreigners were attempting to invade Texas. In September 1818, a small military expedition under Jose de Castenada journeyed to Galveston to investigate reports that foreigners had landed. Veramendi and his friend Navarro volunteered to accompany the troops. Castaneda assigned Sergeant Jose Jimenez to take 3 soldiers, and five civilians, including Navarro and Veramendi, to Natchitoches to deliver some official correspondence. Jimenez instructed his small group to remain camped on the Calcasieu River, while Jimenez, Navarro, and Veramendi finished the trek to Natchitoches. On their way back to camp, the trio took an unexplained 100 miles (160 km) detour to Opelousas. After their return, Veramendi and Navarro were accused of illegally trading in Louisiana, but they were not prosecuted.

Veramendi was elected to the ayuntamiento as a councilman in 1820. The following year, he, Erasmo Seguin, and others from Béxar travelled to Natchitoches to meet Stephen F. Austin, an American who was considering becoming an empresario, or colonizer, in Texas. The men escorted Austin to Béxar. On their journey home, they learned that Mexico had declared independence from Spain.

The new Mexican government soon named La Bahia an official port of entry for Mexico, the first in Texas. Veramendi was named the collector of import taxes, a role which provided him a substantial income. He held this post in 1822 and 1823. leaving office when he was elected alternate deputy of the Texas Provincial Deputation to the Mexican National Constituent Congress. In 1824 and 1825 he was elected alcalde of Béxar. During this time he managed to resolve most of the disputes over the 1813 confiscation of property.

In May 1827, Veramendi was named an alternate legislator to the Congress of the state of Coahuila y Tejas; he would serve if either of the elected legislators was unable to fulfill his duty. He was elected alcalde again in 1828 and used his position as alternate legislator as an excuse to ask that the election be overturned. Governor Jose Maria Viesca refused to set aside the results of the election, instructing Veramendi to serve unless he was actually called to the legislature.

In 1827, Veramendi also received a land grant entitling him to 11 leagues.

He was nominated for Vice-Governor of Coahuila y Tejas in 1830. The legislature, composed of eight men, voted. A run-off was called between Veramendi and Ignacio de Arizpe. Veramendi won the run-off unanimously on September 6, 1830. As vice-governor, he was expected to live in the provincial capital, Saltillo. There is no record that he was ever sworn in, however, and he remained at his home in Béxar.

His eldest daughter married James Bowie on April 25, 1831, "in what was said to have been the most elaborate social event in years".

When the governor of the province, José María de Letona, died in September 1832, Veramendi assumed the office. Two months later, the legislature summoned Veramendi to Saltillo to take over. He was sworn in on December 24, 1832. Among the laws he signed was one transferring the state capitol back to Monclova, an issue very important to Texans. The legislature also dealt with the salaries of local officials, funding for schools and the military, and establishing wells along a main road.

== Death and legacy ==
The government reconvened in Monclova on April 1, 1833. By late August, a cholera epidemic swept the city. The town's water supply was infected, and over 450 people died. The Veramendi family became ill in early September. Veramendi's wife died first, with the rest of the family following quickly. Veramendi died on September 7. His body, and those of his family, were buried in a mass grave at the Royal Hospital Cemetery.

At the time of his death, Veramendi's property was worth over 30,000 pesos. He owned more than 30 books, including a Bible, a book of medicines, French and Spanish grammar, geography, as well as Rights of Man, Life of Napoleon, and Don Quixote.

As of 2010, no comprehensive account of his life has been published.

== Sources ==
McDonald, David R. (2010). "Juan Martin de Veramendi: Tejano Political and Business Leader". In De la Teja, Jesus F. (ed.). Tejano Leadership in Mexican and Revolutionary Texas. Elma Dill Russell Spencer Series in the West and Southwest. Texas A&M University Press. ISBN 978-1603443036.
