= Vicente Álvarez Travieso =

Spanish judge and politician

42nd Mayor of San Antonio
- In office 1776–1779
- Preceded by: Amador Delgado
- Succeeded by: Manuel Delgado

Personal details
- Born: 1705 Tenerife, Canary Islands, Spain
- Died: 1779 (aged 73–74) San Antonio, Texas
- Spouse: Maria Curbelo
- Profession: alguacil mayor (1731- 1779) and mayor (1776) of San Antonio.

Vicente Álvarez Travieso (1705–1779) was a Spanish judge and politician who served as the first alguacil (sheriff or constable) of San Antonio, Texas, from 1731 until his death. He was a leading spokesperson of the Canary Islands settlers of San Antonio and was noted for his support for the Isleño community there. Through his demands to the leaders of New Spain, Travieso was able to improve the lives of the Isleños. He was instrumental in providing medical care for them, thus ensuring their survival. Travieso became mayor of San Antonio in 1776.

== Biography ==
Vicente Alvarez Travieso was born in 1705 in Tenerife (Canary Islands, Spain). He was the son of José Álvarez and Catarina (Cayetano) Travieso.

In 1730, the Spanish Crown decided to sponsor ten or eleven families from the Canary Islands to emigrate to Villa de San Fernando, (modern San Antonio, Texas) because of a supposed threat to Spanish interests by the French from Louisiana. The Travieso family was one of the families who decided to travel to the place. After leaving the port of Santa Cruz de Tenerife, on their way to Texas, the Canarian settlers stopped in what is now modern Mexico. While there, Travieso married his girlfriend, Mariana Curbelo, in Cuautitlan, Mexico. They were listed as the seventh family of the Canary Islanders to travel to San Fernando. After arriving in San Antonio de Béxar, on March 1731, the settlers established a municipal government and Travieso obtained the office of alguacil for life. He used his new position to fight for the rights of the new Canarian settlers, becoming a leading spokesperson.

An example of this was when the Canarians had health issues and he fought for their rights to get medical assistance. On January 24, 1736, some Canarians needed medical care, but permission to travel to Saltillo, Mexico (which was the only place in continental New Spain where they could get medical help) was denied. After this, Alvarez Travieso sent a series of demands to Government of Texas, asking that they allow him to give permission to the Canarians so that they could travel to the city. These permissions were finally accepted in 1770, by the government of Ripperdá (1769–1776). This allowed the Canarians to go to El Saltillo to get the medical care they needed.

Travieso also instituted other lawsuits on behalf of his people. One of these demands (which it took place in 1740) required the use of Native Americans from the Christian missions by the colonists, as they would be used to work on their farms, and the right of the Isleños to trade with the garrison of the presidio. However, "the missionaries appealed to the Viceroy, and they managed to retain their privileges". Travieso sent another demand in 1756, which was directed against the exclusive domain that had the missions on the lands and waters located near the villages, to which the Canarians had no access. Finally, the Isleños access to water surrounding the villages was accepted and, ironically, they became the owners of this water, preventing access to it to the Spanish Franciscans.

Travieso claimed to be the owner of a ranch near the Cibolo Creek, the so-called Rancho de las Mulas. However, the claim was rejected by the Quereteran friars at Nuestra Señora de la Purísima Concepción de Acuña Mission. So, he made another demand in 1771. The trial, which was developed in Mexico City, "was favorable to private stockmen" of San Antonio. However, it was not carried out, so Álvarez Travieso was still not officially recognized as owner of the Rancho de las Mulas, losing land and livestock that he had there.

Alvarez Travieso was elected mayor of San Antonio in 1776. Alvarez Travieso's family did not continue the struggle to recover their livestock, part of which had moved away from the nearby pastures. To prevent such "excesses," the Governor Vicencio Ripperdá issued "two trials against the stockmen of the San Antonio River valley". Travieso Alvarez died on January 25, 1779, just after the procedure.

== After his death ==
In 1785, the Mulas was obtained by Thomas, one of the sons of Vicente Alvarez Travieso. However, other people, who were also heirs of this land, questioned the rights of Thomas to inherit the land. In 1809, the ranch was transferred to Vicente, the son of Thomas.

== Personal life ==
Vicente Álvarez Travieso married Mariana Curbelo (a daughter of future mayor of San Antonio, Juan Curbelo ) on September 18, 1730. They had eleven children. The boat carrying the Canarians to Texas stopped in Mexico. While there, he had problems with the leader of the Canarians and future mayor of San Antonio, Juan Leal. Leal gave him a loan when they (together with other Canarian settlers) were in San Luis Potosí. Later, Leal claimed that Álvarez Travieso did not pay the loan at the agreed time. He only paid it when they arrived in Coahuila, just before reaching San Antonio. After this statement, a dispute began between Juan Leal and Alvarez Travieso. This dispute remained even after they occupied the charges of mayor and alguacil mayor respectively.
