= Salvador Flores =

Alamo survivor

- Born: 1806; San Antonio-Floresville area, Texas
- Died: 1855 (aged 48–49); San Antonio, Texas
- Monuments: Courthouse, Floresville
- Known for: Alamo Defender, Recruiter of Volunteers
- Parent(s): Jose Flores De Abrego and Maria Rodriquez
- Relatives: Juan Seguin, Manuel Flores

Salvador Flores (Jose Salvador Ramon Flores) (ca. 1806–1855) served as a volunteer in the Texan Army in 1835–1836. He was instrumental in organizing and commanding Texian volunteers in support of the Texas Revolution. He participated in many battles and would rise through the ranks to reach Captain status during the fight for Texas independence from Mexico. Salvador continued to provide protection for the ranches and settlers of Texas throughout the Republic years.

== Early life ==
Salvador, nicknamed "Chava" was the son of Jose Flores De Abrego and Maria Rodriquez. They were a prominent family of Béxar, rich in the ranching history of Texas. Four Jose Flores De Abrego sons, Captain Salvador Flores Captain Manuel N. Flores, Lieutenant Nepomuceno Flores, and Private Jose Maria Flores participated in the Texas Revolution, serving at Béxar (Note: "Three men named Flores who received donation certificates for service at the siege of Béxar; Manuel Flores, Manuel Maria Flores, and Salvador Flores. (Men issued Donation Certificates for 640 acres of land for participation in Storming and Capture of Béxar Dec 5, 1835 - Dec 10, 1835 [T5; T1 p254-257]") and San Jacinto. Salvador was also a brother-in-law to Col. Juan Nepomuceno Seguín.

== Texas Revolution ==
=== Fighting begins in Gonzales, Texas ===
The first skirmish establishing the Texas Revolution began in early October 1835, at the Battle of Gonzales. The Texians would be challenged by the Mexican army, when they tried to retake possession of an artillery piece at Gonzales, Texas. It was a small cannon, formerly given them by Mexico, which had been used for security against the Native Indians. Texians considered this action as an infringement of their right to bear arms and were determined to keep it. On October 2, they would show that determination. During this time, a meeting would be held at Salvador Flores Ranch that would organize a volunteer force of Texas ranchers that would favor the impending revolution. Soldiers continued gathering, immigrants, colonists, native Texans. The Texian Army would become a mixture of all peoples, interested in freedom from the oppressive policies of Mexican President Antonio López de Santa Anna.

=== The fight spreads to Goliad, Texas ===
After the victory at Gonzales, the Texan forces gained confidence. Trying to sustain the momentum, Commander Austin deemed it necessary to take possession of Presidio La Bahia (Goliad) and Béxar (San Antonio). The Texian troops marched towards Goliad, to reinforce Major Collinsworth at the Battle of Goliad, but were overtaken by an express from Austin, asking them to join the attack on Béxar. On October 23, 1835, Stephen F. Austin granted a captain's commission to Juan Seguín, authorizing him to form a company, which would be supplied with guns and ammunition by the provisional government. Austin's aide, William T. Austin, asserted that "These mexicans [sic] being well acquainted with the country, were of important service as express riders, guides to foraging parties, &c." Several days later Salvador Flores and Manuel Leal joined the effort with 41 Tejano volunteers from ranches southwest of San Antonio. Flores became the first lieutenant of the central Texas volunteers and Placido 1st Lt. of the southern volunteers. While Seguin would be immediately tasked with the burden of supplying the Texian troops with food and provisions, Salvador was left to reconnoiter the Missions at San Antonio and handle the militia. Several more parties of locals eventually joined in, with isolated enlistments occurring every day.

=== Focus on San Antonio, Texas ===
At Mission San Jose, they accompanied James Bowie, with the orders to approach the city, by following the river's path into town. Four groups, led by Valentine Bennet, Andrew Briscoe, Robert M. Coleman, and Michael Goheen and their scouts, were also sent to explore the other missions. While investigating, they were discovered by Mexican guards and gunfire was exchanged before joining with Bowie.

His recruits joined with Bowie in the Battle of Concepción on Oct 28, 1835. The Texans won again and gained confidence and some new ground. After the fight and learning of the plan to siege Béxar, he would recruit more men from the ranches on the San Antonio River. (Note: This is actually the instance of the extra recruiting by Flores, the totals being mentioned earlier, just placed in chronological context.) Drifting into the volunteer ranks would be fourteen soldados from the fort, now disillusioned with the centralists. On November 10, the Tejanos had teamed up with Deaf Smith and Travis to capture a herd of over 300 horses.

On November 14, Austin instructed Flores to "burn off the whole country from the other side of the Nueces to the Medina on the roads from Laredo and the Rio Grande." This would make it more difficult for the Mexican army to graze their livestock. Flores was also to explore the Rio Grande area and report on any movement of Mexican troops towards Béxar.

During December 5–10, 1835, the Texians would attempt to take Béxar. Now, heavily involved in house to house fighting, Salvador participated as Second Lieutenant in the siege and capture of Béxar. The company of Seguin now amounted to over 160. He would advance with troops to aid in the capture of the Alamo at the Siege of Bexar and the removal of Mexican forces of General Cos from Texas. (Note: After the revolution, Manuel Montalvo, who served with Salvador Flores in Béxar, also joined the Texas Rangers, from Sept. 10-Nov. 21, 1839. He was used many times as a witness on the pension petitions. see at) After the surrender of Cos, his company was sent out to protect the families of the lower ranches, against the devastation made by the retiring Mexican troops and from the reprisal of hostile Indians. The people of Texas would now control Béxar (San Antonio) and the Alamo fort. Colonel James C. Neill receives orders on December 21 to command at Béxar.

Col. James Bowie moves into the Alamo under Neill on January 19, bringing 30 men. On behalf of Henry Smith and General Sam Houston, he assesses the military situation at Béxar. On January 22, verbal intelligence was directed at Col. Neill, from a Tejano courier through the Jose Antonio Navarro family. Jose Cassiano brings news that Gen. Santa Anna had arrived at Saltillo on January 27, with approximately 3000 troops and Sesma at Rio Grande City with 1600 more. Neill passes this information to Houston, now in Goliad. Bowie, after learning that Santa Anna was advancing towards Bexar, wrote several letters to the provisional government asking for supplies and assistance to defend the Alamo

An election for delegates, to attend the Convention of 1836, is held at the Alamo on February 1. Captain Flores, as well as other names, are recorded and preserved on the voting tally list. Neill and Bowie now agree that defending the Alamo is key to achieving Texas independence. On February 3, Colonel Travis arrives in Béxar, with 25 men.

Col. Neill forced to leave on urgent family matters, makes a quick muster roll of his men at the Alamo. Colonel Neill would pass command of the Alamo to William Barret Travis on February 12. Former Congressman David Crockett of Tennessee, boosted the ranks on February 8, with 16 additional men.

On February 10, a party was given to honor the arrival of David Crockett. With Neill leaving early on February 11, he was not present. Blas María Herrera, a courier, from Plácido Benavides, was searching for Juan Seguin at the party and could not locate him. Possessing a letter dated February 6, it was then given to Antonio Menchaca. Handwritten in Spanish, it announced soldados at Presido Rio Grande, ready to march on Béxar. Travis now forewarned, remarked that it would take about 13 days for the Mexican army to arrive, and still was not immediately concerned with the information received and the party continued into the night.

Bowie and Travis agree to share command on the 14th. On Feb.16, Ambrosio Rodriquez was warned by his wife's cousin from Laredo, and another warning came again on Feb. 18. Travis was still skeptical. On the 20th, Blas María Herrera from Seguin's own company reported that Santa Anna had crossed into Texas. Travis held a council that night at 9 p.m.. The story was told and the same verdict was reached, it couldn't be true. Local families began packing possessions, with intent to leave Béxar. About a dozen of Seguin's men were so convinced, that they requested to leave, in order to remove their families from Santa Anna's path.

Santa Anna's forces would enter Béxar on February 23, surprising the Texian forces and initiating a Siege of the Alamo. The Texians and Tejanos would immediately gather in the Alamo for safety and defense, with some bringing their families into the compound. The battle lasted for thirteen days, with the final battle lasting ninety minutes and terminating in violent hand-to-hand combat. All Texian forces effectively lost. Several Tejanos remaining in the Alamo perished: San Antonians Juan Abamillo, José Gregorio Esparza, Antonio Fuentes, Toribio Losoya, Andrés Nava, Juan A. Badillo, Damacio Jiménez and José María Guerrero. Antonio Cruz y Arocha and Alexandro de la Garza left as couriers before the fall.

Juan Seguín stated that with him, 15 men also entered to defend the Alamo. Lindley believes that the Flores brothers were defending the Alamo during the siege. After serving at the Battle of Béxar, Salvador was one of the few, 100 or so, that remained at the Alamo with Neill. His brother Manuel, and other Tejanos (15) entered on February 23. Neill's roster places Captain Flores in the Alamo as an artillery officer. Captain Flores also appears on Colonel Neill's voting tally, as well. (Note: Many instances of old have been found in which Spanish names have been lost or confused because of misspelling, due to efforts by English-speaking recorders to spell names in accordance with their pronunciation or English transliteration. (Flores translates in English to Flowers) Floris, Florez, Flowers, Flodders, Flouders are alternate spellings found for Flores. Muster rolls and documents that contain phonetic, partially mis-transcribed, or translated spelling is common for the period.) Somehow, they seem to have exited soon after Seguin's departure, thus putting them on the Alamo survivor list. In 1907, Enrique Esparza claimed that Santa Anna called an armistice and he remembers some Flores leaving then. They took this opportunity to gather Alamo reinforcements, bringing along a couple more of the Flores brothers (according to Seguin, they had a Tejano force of 100 when they regrouped in Gonzales), and secure their families (having not been seen, since abruptly entering the Alamo). They then rendezvoused with Seguin, now in Gonzales. The company headed for the Alamo. The Tejano defenders were joined by up to fourteen more men from Gonzales (led by former Alamo couriers Alsbury and Sutherland). They proceeded toward the Alamo. There they waited on the Cibolo Creek to team up with Fannin. The Alamo fell before they could reach it. (Note: Lindley's research concludes that a relief force was waiting on the Cibolo ford and were located by a team that sallied out with Crockett. They entered the Alamo near the end of the battle. Travis' March 3 letter states that only three Tejanos were left in the Alamo after the armistice, but seven died there. One might logically conclude that four more of the Seguin-Flores recruits also entered as part of the relief force, although they possibly thought there was only a slim chance of survival. See Lindley, p. 142.)

=== Regrouping in Gonzales and on to San Jacinto, Texas ===
The news of the fall of Béxar and Battle of the Alamo was overwhelming for the Texans. A frantic flee eastward began immediately after receiving the fateful news at Gonzales in March 1836. The Tejano volunteers now being reassembled at Gonzales would ride with Captain Flores. Salvador Flores had accepted Sam Houston's orders during this Runaway Scrape. As troops would march away from Gonzales, Salvador Flores along with a group of volunteers formed the rear guard that protected the fleeing families and proceeded westward to secure the lower ranches of San Antonio. (Note: Verbal dispatch with orders Sam Houston to Flores March, 1836, as no documents have been found verifying this order, but Houston never denied it. Pension petitions verify that the troops were there helping the evacuees escape. See Lindley (2003) pg. 170) The forces then split. Salvador maintained this position offering protection from Mexican and Indian attack, while his relatives Capt. Manuel Flores, Lieutenant Nepomuceno Flores, left with Seguin to regroup a company of men that followed Houston toward east Texas and on to San Jacinto.

== Texas Republic 1836–1842 ==
In late 1836, Salvador Flores was Captain of Company C, which served the citizens of Texas, much like a ranging company. (Note: After becoming a Republic, J.N. Seguin had become be the head of the San Antonio military, commander of a battalion of three companies (A, B, C), in defence of the western frontier of Texas. See de la Teja (1991), p. 29.) Later in 1839, Flores would serve the Republic of Texas, as 1st Lt. in Col. Juan N. Seguin's Company. Salvador Flores would protect the colonists as a participant in the Henry Karnes campaign against the hostile Comanche Indians. As a member of the Karnes Company, he would team up with Mathew Caldwell's Rangers in the pursuit of Vincente Cordova. Again he would be involved in 1842 in organizing San Antonio citizens concerned with the imminent re-invasion by Mexico. Assigned as Captain by Mayor John William Smith, he would command 100 local Tejanos against the Mexican invaders led by General Adrián Woll.

== Later life and family ==
Flores married Conception Rojo on September 30, 1848, in San Antonio, and they had two children. Salvador Flores spent the remainder of his life in and around the now-U.S. city of San Antonio, Texas. He died on January 17, 1855, in that city. Juan Seguin was appointed administrator of his holdings and became the guardian of his family. In 1858, he filed a probate for the Flores family.

== Legacy ==
His skills and tactics demonstrated on horseback would be those modeled by the Texas Rangers. In later years, the Flores descendants would be the ones to donate the land for the establishment of the city in Texas that bears their name: Floresville, Texas. A Texas State Historical Marker was placed at the Floresville courthouse during the 1986 Texas sesquicentennial. It now stands in honor to Salvador Flores and his family for their service to Texas.

== Tejanos who served under Juan Seguín ==
Tejano volunteers under Juan Seguín

Tejano volunteers under the command of Juan Seguín for all or part of their service in the Texas Revolution and the Republic of Texas. Note that Seguin's men at the Alamo were scouts/couriers going in and out, between San Antonio and nearby Gonzales, the rallying point for volunteers.

Siege of Béxar

- Juan Abamillo
- José Alamedo
- José María Arocha
- Juan José Arocha
- Plácido Benavides
- Juan Antonio Badillo
- Manuel Bueno
- Clemente Bustillos
- Mateo Casillas
- Pablo Casillas
- Luis Castañon
- Agapito Cervantes
- Carlos Chacón
- Miguel Cilba
- Ciriaco Contes
- Julian Contes
- Antonio Cruz y Arocha
- Antonio Curvier (aka Curbier)
- Domingo Díaz
- Francisco Díaz
- Julian Díaz
- José Gregorio Esparza
- Ignacio Espinoza
- Manuel N. Flores
- Salvador Flores
- Antonio Fuentes
- Manuel Gallardo
- Pedro Gaona
- Casimiro García
- Clemente García
- Guadalupe García
- Jesus García
- Simon García
- Alexandro de la Garza
- José María de la Garza
- Marcelino de la Garza
- Paulino de la Garza
- Francisco Gómez
- Jesús Gómez
- Gabriel Gonzalez
- Brigido Guerrero
- Antonio Hernández
- Eduardo Hernández
- Gregorio Hernández
- Blas María Herrera
- Pedro Herrera
- Toribio Herrera
- Damacio Jiménez
- José Domingo Losoya
- Toribio Losoya
- Juan Maldonado
- José María Mancha
- Pablo Mansolo
- Francisco Miranda
- Andrés Nava
- Nepomuceno Navarro
- Juan José Palacios
- Eduardo Ramirez
- Vicente Ramos
- Ambrosio Rodríguez
- Ramón Rubio
- Antonio Ruiz
- Esmerigeldo Ruiz
- Francisco Salinas
- Miguel (Margil) Salinas
- Pablo Salinas
- Agapito Tejado
- Francisco Valdéz
- Esteban Villarreal
- José Zúñiga

Battle of the Alamo

- Juan Abamillo
- Simón Arreola
- Juan Antonio Badillo
- José María Arocha
- Juan María Cabrera
- Cesario Carmona
- Antonio Cruz y Arocha
- José Gregorio Esparza
- Antonio Fuentes
- Alexandro de la Garza
- Brigido Guerrero
- Damacio Jiménez (aka Ximenes)
- Jose Maria Jimenez
- Toribio Losoya
- Andrés Nava
- Jose Sebastian Pacheco (aka Luciano Granado)
- Marcos Veramendi

Battle of San Jacinto

- José María Arocha
- Manuel Arocha (aka Manuel de Arocha)
- Simón Arreola
- Andre Bárcinas
- Manuel Bueno
- Juan María Cabrera
- Cesario Carmona
- Gabriel Casillas
- Cayetano Castillo
- Antonio Cruz y Arocha
- Francisco Cuellar
- Antonio Curvier (aka Curbier)
- Fernando Curvier (aka Curbier)
- Matias Curvier (aka Curbier)
- Lucio Enriquez (aka Enriques)
- Manuel N. Flores
- Martin Flores
- Nepomuceno Flores
- Pedro Flores
- Salvador Flores
- Pedro Herrera
- Jose Maria Jimenez
- Juan Jimenez
- Jose Polinio Lavjina
- Narcisco Leal
- Juan Lopez
- Pedro Lopez
- Martin Maldonado
- Tomás Maldonado
- José María Mancha
- Juan Martinez
- Tomas Martinez
- Miguel Mata
- José Antonio Menchaca
- Jose Molina
- Manuel Montalvo
- Crecensio Montez
- Hipolito Montoya
- Antonio Olivas
- Nepomuceno Navarro
- Jacinto Peña
- Damacio de los Reyes
- Eduardo Ramirez
- Ambrosio Rodríguez
- Jose Antonio Rodríguez
- Pablo Salinas
- Manuel Antonio Santiago Tarin
- Antonio Treviño
- Esteban Uran
- Andres Varcinas
- Juan Zambrano
- Vicente Zepeda

Republic of Texas service post-San Jacinto

- Eusebio Almaguez
- Miguel Arcieniega Jr.
- Andre Bárcinas
- Antonio Benites
- Anselmo Bergara
- Manuel Bueno
- Pedro Camarillo
- Mariano Carbajal
- Ignacio Castillo
- Nemecio de la Cerda
- Agapito Cervantes
- Augustin Chaves
- Antonio Conix
- Simón Contreras
- Trinidad Coy
- Antonio Cruz y Arocha
- Antonio Curvier (aka Curbier)
- Nicholas Delgado
- Polonio Díaz
- Ignacio Espinoza
- Antonio Estrada
- Manuel Estrada
- Eusibio Farias
- Manuel N. Flores
- Martin Flores
- Nepomuceno Flores
- Salvador Flores
- Agapio Gaitan
- Damacio Galban
- Leandro Garza
- Vicente Garza
- Manuel Hernández
- Felipe Jaimes
- José María Landera
- Xavier Lazo
- Cayetano Lerma
- Manuel Lopez
- Juan Maldonado
- Gabriel Martinez
- Manuel Martinez
- Miguel Mata
- Manuel Montalvo
- Manuel Montate
- Francisco Morales
- Pedro Flores Morales
- José Antonio Navarro
- José Luciano Navarro
- Jacinto Peña
- James Quina
- Eduardo Ramirez
- José María Rios
- Cayetano Rivas
- Ambrosio Rodríguez
- Francisco Rodríguez
- Juan Rodríguez
- Mariano Romano
- Cristobal Rubio
- Antonio Ruiz
- Franco Ruiz
- Antonio Sambraño
- Antonio Sanches
- Guadalupe de los Santos
- Nicolas de los Santos
- Juan Sombraña
- Gregorio Sota
- Ramon Trevino
- José María Valdéz
- Juan Vallanceon
- Marcos Veramendi
- Antonio Hernandez Zavala
- Jesus Zavala

Sources:

- "San Jacinto Museum of History - The Kemp Sketches". San Jacinto Museum of History.
- MacDonald, L. Lloyd (2009). Tejanos in the 1835 Texas Revolution. Pelican Publishing. pp. 260–262. ISBN 978-1589806382.
- Teja, Jesus F. De la; Matovina, Timothy; Poché, Justin (2013). Recollections of a Tejano Life: Antonio Menchaca in Texas History. University of Texas Press. p. 90. ISBN 978-0292748651.
- Texas State Archives, Republic of Texas Claims
- Texas A & M professor Wallace L. McKeehan, also on the school's Board of Regents website: Hispanic Texian Patriots in the Struggle for Independence
- Handbook of Texas

== See also ==
- List of Texas Revolution battles
- Timeline of the Texas Revolution
- Juan Seguin
- Manuel N. Flores

== Sources ==
- Banks, Herbert C. (2001), Daughters of the Republic of Texas -Patriot A.A. Vol.2, Paducah, Ky.: Turner Publishing Company, ISBN 1-56311-641-3
- Brands, H.W. (2005), Lone Star Nation: The Epic Story of the Battle for Texas Independence, 1835, New York: Random House, Inc., ISBN 1-4000-3070-6
- Barr, Alwyn (1990), Texans in Revolt: the Battle for San Antonio, 1835, Austin, TX: University of Texas Press, ISBN 0-292-77042-1, OCLC 20354408
- Chabot, Frederick Charles (1975), With the Makers of San Antonio, Oregon: Graphic Arts, ASIN B0006WDE9Q
- del la Teja, Jesus (1991), A Revolution Remembered: The Memoirs and Selected Correspondence of Juan N. Seguin, Austin, TX: State House Press, ISBN 0-938349-68-6
- Edmondson, J.R. (2000), The Alamo Story-From History to Current Conflicts, Plano, TX: Republic of Texas Press, ISBN 1-55622-678-0
- Groneman, Bill (1990), Alamo Defenders, A Genealogy: The People and Their Words, Austin, TX: Eakin Press, ISBN 0-89015-757-X
- Graham, Davis (2002), Land!: Irish Pioneers in Mexican and Revolutionary Texas, College Station, TX: TAMU Press, ISBN 1-58544-189-9
- Hansen, Todd (2003), The Alamo Reader: A Study in History, Stackpole Books, ISBN 978-0-8117-0060-3
- Hardin, Stephen L. (1996), "Efficient in the Cause", in Poyo, Gerald Eugene (ed.), Tejano Journey, 1770–1850, University of Texas Press, ISBN 9780292765702
- Hardin, Stephen L. (1994), Texian Iliad – A Military History of the Texas Revolution, Austin, TX: University of Texas Press, ISBN 0-292-73086-1, OCLC 29704011
- Hardin, Stephen L; Teja, Jesús F. de la (2010), "Plácido Benavides :Fighting Tejano Federalist", Tejano Leadership in Mexican and Revolutionary Texas, TAMU Press, ISBN 978-1-60344-166-7
- Hopewell, Clifford (1994), James Bowie Texas Fighting Man: A Biography, Austin, TX: Eakin Press, ISBN 0-89015-881-9
- Kemp, Louis Wiltz (1974), Honor Roll of the Battle of San Jacinto: the Complete List of Participants and Personnel on Detached Service, La Porte, Texas: San San Jacinto Museum of History, ASIN B0006XCLJ4
- Lindley, Thomas Ricks (2003), Alamo Traces: New Evidence and New Conclusions, Lanham, MD: Republic of Texas Press, ISBN 1-55622-983-6
- Lord, Walter (1961), A Time to Stand, Lincoln, NE: University of Nebraska Press, ISBN 0-8032-7902-7
- Lozano, Ruben Rendon (1985), Viva Texas: The Story of the Tejanos, th Mexican-born Patriots of the Texas Revolution, San Antonio, TX: The Alamo Press, ISBN 0-943260-02-7
- Manchaca, Martha (2001), Recovering History, Constructing Race: The Indian, Black, and White Roots of Mexican Americans, The Joe R. and Teresa Lozano Long Series in Latin American and Latino Art and Culture, Austin, TX: University of Texas Press, ISBN 0-292-75253-9
- Matovina, Timothy M. (1995), The Alamo Remembered: Tejano Accounts and Perspectives, Austin, TX: University of Texas Press, ISBN 0-292-75186-9
- Moore, Stephen L. (2004), Eighteen Minutes: The Battle of San Jacinto and the Texas Independence Campaign, TX: Republic of Texas, ISBN 1-58907-009-7
- Moore, Stephen L. (2006), Savage Frontier: Rangers, Riflemen, and Indian Wars in Texas, Volume II, 1838-1839, Denton, TX: University of North Texas Press, ISBN 978-1-57441-206-2
- Nance, Joseph Milton (1963), After San Jacinto: The Texas-Mexican Frontier, 1836-1841, Texas: University of Texas Press, ASIN B0007DN8A4
- Poyo, Gerald Eugene (1996), Tejano journey, 1770-1850, Austin, TX: University of Texas Press, ISBN 0-292-76570-3
- Ramos, Raul A. (2008), Beyond the Alamo, forging Mexican ethnicity in San Antonio, 1821-1861, NC: The University of North Carolina Press, ISBN 978-0-8078-3207-3
- SRT, SRT (2001), Sons of the Republic of Texas, Paducah, KY: Turner Pub Co, ISBN 1-56311-603-0
- Sullivan, Roy (2011), The Texas Revolution: Tejano Heroes, USA: AuthorHouse, ISBN 978-1468523416
- Todish, Timothy J.; Todish, Terry; Spring, Ted (1998), Alamo Sourcebook, 1836: A Comprehensive Guide to the Battle of the Alamo and the Texas Revolution, Austin, TX: Eakin Press, ISBN 978-1-57168-152-2
- Tovares, Joseph (2004), Remember the Alamo, Produced by Tovares, PBS American Experience, archived from the original on February 25, 2004
- Winders, Richard Bruce (2004), Sacrificed at the Alamo: Tragedy and Triumph in the Texas Revolution, Austin, TX: State House Press, ISBN 1-880510-81-2
