= Manuel N. Flores =

Soldier in the Texas Revolution

Manuel Flores
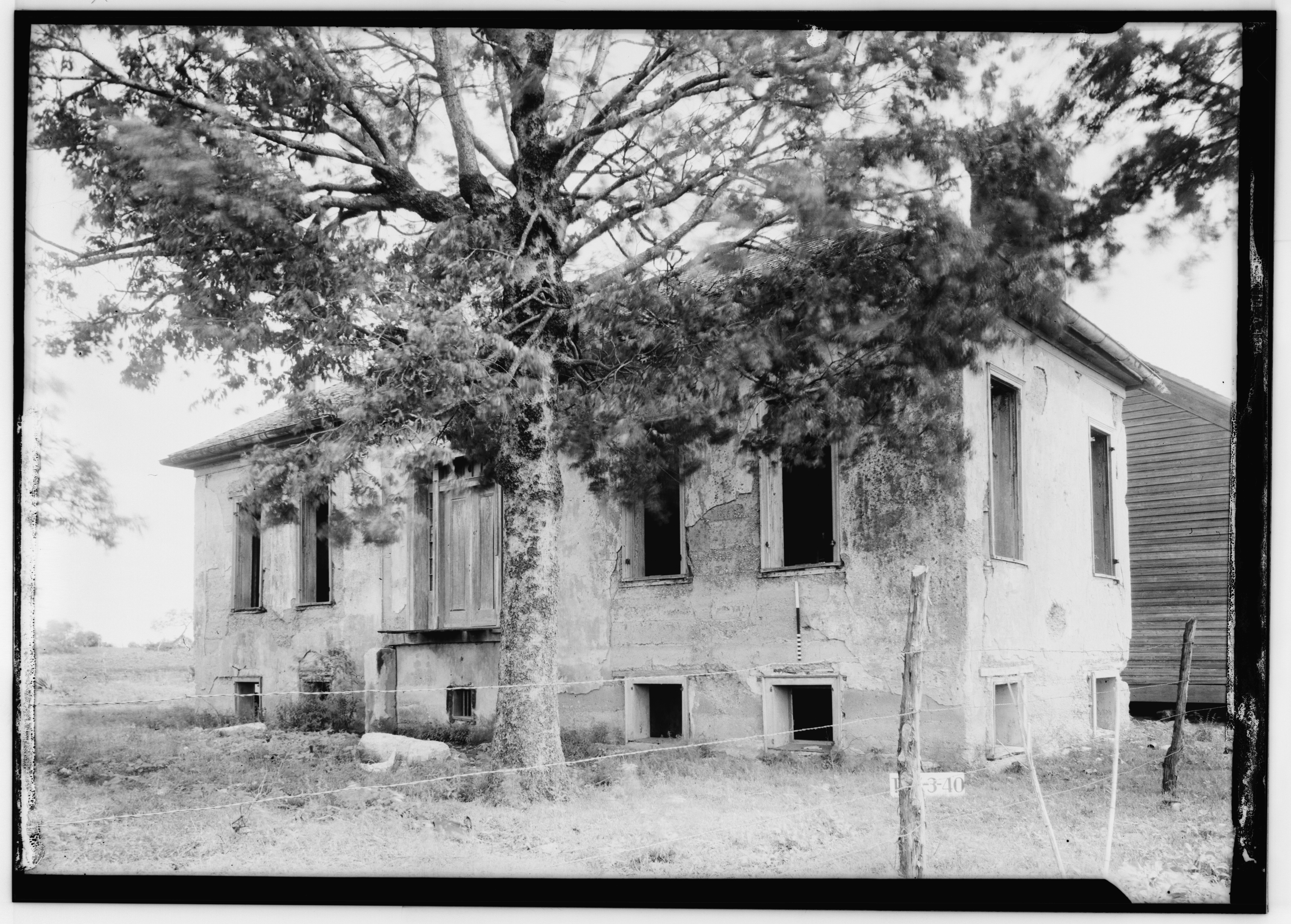
- Manuel N. Flores House, Seguin, Texas
- Born: 1801; San Antonio-Floresville area, Spanish Texas
- Died: 1868 (aged 67)
- Monuments: Courthouse, Floresville
- Known for: Participation in Texas Revolution – San Antonio and San Jacinto
- Parent(s): Jose Flores De Abrego and Maria Rodriquez
- Relatives: Juan Seguin, Salvador Flores

Manuel Flores (Jose Manuel Nepomunceno Paublino Flores; ca. 1801–1868) served as a volunteer in the Texas army in 1835–1838. Fighting and commanding, he rose through the ranks to reach sergeant status during the fight for Texas independence and was commissioned a captain during the Republic years.

== Family history – early years ==
Manuel Flores was born in Spanish Texas on June 16, 1799, (Note: Birth date most commonly used and referenced in the Handbook of Texas, is 1801) in La Villa de San Fernando de Bexar. He was a skilled vaquero and ranchero that lived on the San Antonio River below San Antonio. He married Maria Josefa Courbière in 1835. He married Margarita Garza in 1858.

He was the son of Jose Flores De Abrego and Maria Rodriquez They were a prominent family of Bexar, rich in the ranching history of Texas and steeped in the cause of secession from Mexico.

Supporting the 1835–1836 Texas independence movement were four Flores De Abrego sons, Captain Salvador Flores Captain Manuel Flores, Lieutenant Nepomuceno Flores, and Private Jose Maria Flores, having participated in the Texas Revolution, serving at Bexar and San Jacinto. Manuel was the brother-in-law of Col. Juan Nepomuceno Seguín.

== Texas Revolution ==
=== Battle of Gonzales ===
Anticipating the Battle of Gonzales, a meeting would be held late in September 1835 at the Flores Ranch, that would organize a volunteer force of Texas ranchers that would favor the impending revolution. In Gonzales, immigrants, colonists, and Texian volunteers continued gathering. The Texian Army would become a mixture of all peoples, interested in the cause of democracy. Manuel Flores would be in favor, and volunteer his services to Texas. Manuel Flores would be the courier to inform Stephen F. Austin that Juan N. Seguin's volunteer company would join in at Béxar, against General Cos.

=== Siege of Bexar ===
The attention of the commander of the Texian volunteer forces, Stephen F. Austin, now focused towards a Béxar campaign. Manuel and his brother, Salvador Flores, along with Manuel Leal, organized 41 volunteers from ranches southwest of San Antonio, where they reinforced the Texan forces on the Salado Creek, in mid-October, a few days after Juan Seguin and Plácido Benavides of Victoria had also gathered 70 men to aid Commander Stephen F. Austin. Manuel Flores entered the company with Juan Seguin elected as commander. In December 1835, after a two-month siege of Bexar, that finally ended in ferocious house-to-house fighting, Manuel Flores participated in the removal of Gen. Martín Perfecto de Cos at the Siege of Bexar.

=== Battle of the Alamo ===
Seguin stated that he brought 15 men into the Alamo along with him. Lindley believed that the Flores brothers were defending the Alamo some time near the beginning of the siege. Manuel and the volunteers entered the Alamo on February 23. His brother had been one of the 100 or so that had served at the Siege of Bexar and remained in the Alamo with Colonel James C. Neill. At some point later in the siege, after Seguin's departure as a courier, the Flores brothers exited the Alamo, thus making them survivors of the Alamo siege. In 1907, Alamo survivor Enrique Esparza stated that Santa Anna called an armistice for three days and he remembers the Flores brothers leaving at that time. They had entered the Alamo hastily when the Mexican army arrived and now they took the chance to check on the condition of their families, who had been left alone in their homes. After securing the safety of their families, they regrouped and recruited a few more men from the area, gaining a few more Flores brothers. They then rendezvoused with Seguin in Gonzales. There, the native Texan defenders were joined by other men from Gonzales and proceeded westward to reinforce the Alamo. There, on the Cibolo, they waited to team up with Fannin's army. Fannin never made it to the Cibolo, thus the Alamo fell before they could reach it.

=== Battle of San Jacinto ===
A company was reorganized in Gonzales during the first week of March 1836, and Manuel Flores became Captain Seguin's first sergeant. This force would now split up. Salvador Flores formed the western rear guard and would maintain this position offering protection from Mexican and Indian attack, while Sergeant Manuel Flores, with his brothers and brother-in-law gathered their company to follow Houston eastward. This company blocked the Mexican army from crossing the Brazos river, preventing them from overtaking the Texians. Sergeant Manuel Flores together with Captain Juan Seguin, Corporal Nepomuceno Flores, Private Jose Maria Flores and their Tejano company would then join in with Houston and Rusk to overtake Santa Anna's army, in the rout at the Battle of San Jacinto.

Manuel Flores is credited for taking the lead in the final charge against Santa Anna's army at San Jacinto. Although originally a cavalry company, they would fight with Sidney Sherman's force as infantry. José Maria Rodriquez states in his book Memoirs of Early Texas, that during the final charge, the Texans fired and fell to the ground waiting for a volley from the Mexican camp, but Manuel Flores remained standing and challenged the Texican Army to "get up" and follow his lead, for the Mexicans were running. They got up and pursued the Army, taking many prisoners.

== Republic of Texas ==
After the Texas Revolution, he was commissioned as first lieutenant in Company B of the Second Regiment of Cavalry. Next he was commissioned the captain of a cavalry company in defense of the new republic, participating in much the same way a ranger company would. (Note: He is often confused with the Mexican emissary also named Manuel Flores, who was killed at the battle of the San Gabriels in 1838.) In 1838 he established a ranch on the south side of the Guadalupe River near a natural rock waterfalls and directly across from Seguin, Texas. Being one of the larger operating ranches of the time, it was visited in 1846 by German geologist Ferdinand von Roemer, who described the home and the Flores Falls in his works Die Kreidebildungen von Texas and ihre organischen Einschlüsse (1852).

In 1842, San Antonio was overrun twice, by Santa Anna's forces. During March 1842, the citizens of San Antonio sought refuge at Manuel Flores Ranch in the city of Seguin, Texas. There, a counterattack was planned and Manuel Flores was a member of the party that pursued the army of Ráfael Vásquez. Even though his brother-in-law, Juan Seguin had also joined in the pursuit that chased the invaders from Texas, Seguin was doomed to be blamed for the invasion. The Flores ranch in Seguin would again become a base camp when General Adrian Woll attacked San Antonio in September 1842.

== Legacy ==
In later years, the Flores descendants were the ones to donate the land for the establishment of the City in Texas that bears their name: Floresville, Texas.

A Texas State Historical Marker was placed at the Floresville courthouse during the 1986 Texas sesquicentennial. It now stands in honor to Manuel Flores and his family for their service to Texas.

== Tejanos who served under Juan Seguín ==
Tejano volunteers under Juan Seguín

Tejano volunteers under the command of Juan Seguín for all or part of their service in the Texas Revolution and the Republic of Texas. Note that Seguin's men at the Alamo were scouts/couriers going in and out, between San Antonio and nearby Gonzales, the rallying point for volunteers.

Siege of Béxar

- Juan Abamillo
- José Alamedo
- José María Arocha
- Juan José Arocha
- Plácido Benavides
- Juan Antonio Badillo
- Manuel Bueno
- Clemente Bustillos
- Mateo Casillas
- Pablo Casillas
- Luis Castañon
- Agapito Cervantes
- Carlos Chacón
- Miguel Cilba
- Ciriaco Contes
- Julian Contes
- Antonio Cruz y Arocha
- Antonio Curvier (aka Curbier)
- Domingo Díaz
- Francisco Díaz
- Julian Díaz
- José Gregorio Esparza
- Ignacio Espinoza
- Manuel N. Flores
- Salvador Flores
- Antonio Fuentes
- Manuel Gallardo
- Pedro Gaona
- Casimiro García
- Clemente García
- Guadalupe García
- Jesus García
- Simon García
- Alexandro de la Garza
- José María de la Garza
- Marcelino de la Garza
- Paulino de la Garza
- Francisco Gómez
- Jesús Gómez
- Gabriel Gonzalez
- Brigido Guerrero
- Antonio Hernández
- Eduardo Hernández
- Gregorio Hernández
- Blas María Herrera
- Pedro Herrera
- Toribio Herrera
- Damacio Jiménez
- José Domingo Losoya
- Toribio Losoya
- Juan Maldonado
- José María Mancha
- Pablo Mansolo
- Francisco Miranda
- Andrés Nava
- Nepomuceno Navarro
- Juan José Palacios
- Eduardo Ramirez
- Vicente Ramos
- Ambrosio Rodríguez
- Ramón Rubio
- Antonio Ruiz
- Esmerigeldo Ruiz
- Francisco Salinas
- Miguel (Margil) Salinas
- Pablo Salinas
- Agapito Tejado
- Francisco Valdéz
- Esteban Villarreal
- José Zúñiga

Battle of the Alamo

- Juan Abamillo
- Simón Arreola
- Juan Antonio Badillo
- José María Arocha
- Juan María Cabrera
- Cesario Carmona
- Antonio Cruz y Arocha
- José Gregorio Esparza
- Antonio Fuentes
- Alexandro de la Garza
- Brigido Guerrero
- Damacio Jiménez (aka Ximenes)
- Jose Maria Jimenez
- Toribio Losoya
- Andrés Nava
- Jose Sebastian Pacheco (aka Luciano Granado)
- Marcos Veramendi

Battle of San Jacinto

- José María Arocha
- Manuel Arocha (aka Manuel de Arocha)
- Simón Arreola
- Andre Bárcinas
- Manuel Bueno
- Juan María Cabrera
- Cesario Carmona
- Gabriel Casillas
- Cayetano Castillo
- Antonio Cruz y Arocha
- Francisco Cuellar
- Antonio Curvier (aka Curbier)
- Fernando Curvier (aka Curbier)
- Matias Curvier (aka Curbier)
- Lucio Enriquez (aka Enriques)
- Manuel N. Flores
- Martin Flores
- Nepomuceno Flores
- Pedro Flores
- Salvador Flores
- Pedro Herrera
- Jose Maria Jimenez
- Juan Jimenez
- Jose Polinio Lavjina
- Narcisco Leal
- Juan Lopez
- Pedro Lopez
- Martin Maldonado
- Tomás Maldonado
- José María Mancha
- Juan Martinez
- Tomas Martinez
- Miguel Mata
- José Antonio Menchaca
- Jose Molina
- Manuel Montalvo
- Crecensio Montez
- Hipolito Montoya
- Antonio Olivas
- Nepomuceno Navarro
- Jacinto Peña
- Damacio de los Reyes
- Eduardo Ramirez
- Ambrosio Rodríguez
- Jose Antonio Rodríguez
- Pablo Salinas
- Manuel Antonio Santiago Tarin
- Antonio Treviño
- Esteban Uran
- Andres Varcinas
- Juan Zambrano
- Vicente Zepeda

Republic of Texas service post-San Jacinto

- Eusebio Almaguez
- Miguel Arcieniega Jr.
- Andre Bárcinas
- Antonio Benites
- Anselmo Bergara
- Manuel Bueno
- Pedro Camarillo
- Mariano Carbajal
- Ignacio Castillo
- Nemecio de la Cerda
- Agapito Cervantes
- Augustin Chaves
- Antonio Conix
- Simón Contreras
- Trinidad Coy
- Antonio Cruz y Arocha
- Antonio Curvier (aka Curbier)
- Nicholas Delgado
- Polonio Díaz
- Ignacio Espinoza
- Antonio Estrada
- Manuel Estrada
- Eusibio Farias
- Manuel N. Flores
- Martin Flores
- Nepomuceno Flores
- Salvador Flores
- Agapio Gaitan
- Damacio Galban
- Leandro Garza
- Vicente Garza
- Manuel Hernández
- Felipe Jaimes
- José María Landera
- Xavier Lazo
- Cayetano Lerma
- Manuel Lopez
- Juan Maldonado
- Gabriel Martinez
- Manuel Martinez
- Miguel Mata
- Manuel Montalvo
- Manuel Montate
- Francisco Morales
- Pedro Flores Morales
- José Antonio Navarro
- José Luciano Navarro
- Jacinto Peña
- James Quina
- Eduardo Ramirez
- José María Rios
- Cayetano Rivas
- Ambrosio Rodríguez
- Francisco Rodríguez
- Juan Rodríguez
- Mariano Romano
- Cristobal Rubio
- Antonio Ruiz
- Franco Ruiz
- Antonio Sambraño
- Antonio Sanches
- Guadalupe de los Santos
- Nicolas de los Santos
- Juan Sombraña
- Gregorio Sota
- Ramon Trevino
- José María Valdéz
- Juan Vallanceon
- Marcos Veramendi
- Antonio Hernandez Zavala
- Jesus Zavala

Sources:

- "San Jacinto Museum of History - The Kemp Sketches". San Jacinto Museum of History.
- MacDonald, L. Lloyd (2009). Tejanos in the 1835 Texas Revolution. Pelican Publishing. pp. 260–262. ISBN 978-1589806382.
- Teja, Jesus F. De la; Matovina, Timothy; Poché, Justin (2013). Recollections of a Tejano Life: Antonio Menchaca in Texas History. University of Texas Press. p. 90. ISBN 978-0292748651.
- Texas State Archives, Republic of Texas Claims
- Texas A & M professor Wallace L. McKeehan, also on the school's Board of Regents website: Hispanic Texian Patriots in the Struggle for Independence
- Handbook of Texas

== See also ==
- List of Texas Revolution battles
- Timeline of the Texas Revolution
- Juan Seguin
- Salvador Flores

== Sources ==
- Banks, Herbert C. (2001). Daughters of the Republic of Texas -Patriot A.A. Vol.2. Paducah, Ky.: Turner Publishing Company. ISBN 1-56311-641-3.
- Barr, Alwyn (1990). Texans in Revolt: the Battle for San Antonio, 1835. Austin, TX: University of Texas Press. ISBN 0-292-77042-1. OCLC 20354408.
- Brands, H.W. (2005). Lone Star Nation: The Epic Story of the Battle for Texas Independence, 1835. New York: Random House, Inc. ISBN 1-4000-3070-6.
- del la Teja, Jesus (1991). A Revolution Remembered: The Memoirs and Selected Correspondence of Juan N. Seguin. Austin, TX: State House Press. ISBN 0-938349-68-6.
- Edmondson, J.R. (2000). The Alamo Story-From History to Current Conflicts. Plano, TX: Republic of Texas Press. ISBN 1-55622-678-0.
- Groneman, Bill (1990). Alamo Defenders, A Genealogy: The People and Their Words. Austin, TX: Eakin Press. ISBN 0-89015-757-X.
- Graham, Davis (2002). Land!: Irish Pioneers in Mexican and Revolutionary Texas. College Station, TX: TAMU Press. ISBN 1-58544-189-9.
- Hardin, Stephen L. (1994). Texian Iliad – A Military History of the Texas Revolution. Austin, TX: University of Texas Press. ISBN 0-292-73086-1. OCLC 29704011.
- Lindley, Thomas Ricks (2003). Alamo Traces: New Evidence and New Conclusions. Lanham, MD: Republic of Texas Press. ISBN 1-55622-983-6.
- Lord, Walter (1961). A Time to Stand. Lincoln, NE: University of Nebraska Press. ISBN 0-8032-7902-7.
- Lozano, Ruben Rendon (1985). Viva Texas: The Story of the Tejanos, the Mexican-born Patriots of the Texas Revolution. San Antonio, TX: The Alamo Press. ISBN 0-943260-02-7.
- Matovina, Timothy M. (1995). The Alamo Remembered: Tejano Accounts and Perspectives. Austin, TX: University of Texas Press. ISBN 0-292-75186-9.
- Moore, Stephen L. (2004). Eighteen Minutes: The Battle of San Jacinto and the Texas Independence Campaign. TX: Republic of Texas. ISBN 1-58907-009-7.
- SRT, SRT (2001). Sons of the Republic of Texas. Paducah, KY: Turner Pub Co. ISBN 1-56311-603-0.
- Rodriguez, José María (2010) [1913]. Rodriguez Memoirs of Early Texas. Charleston, SC: Nabu Press. ISBN 978-1-149-53168-6.
