= José Antonio Navarro =

American politician

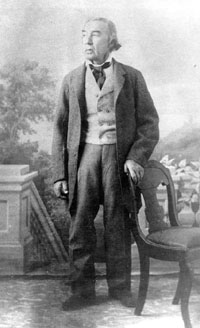

Personal details
- Born: February 27, 1795 San Antonio de Béxar, Spanish Texas, Viceroyalty of New Spain
- Died: January 13, 1871 (aged 75) San Antonio, Texas, U.S.
- Spouse: Margarita de la Garza
- Profession: Statesman, revolutionary and merchant

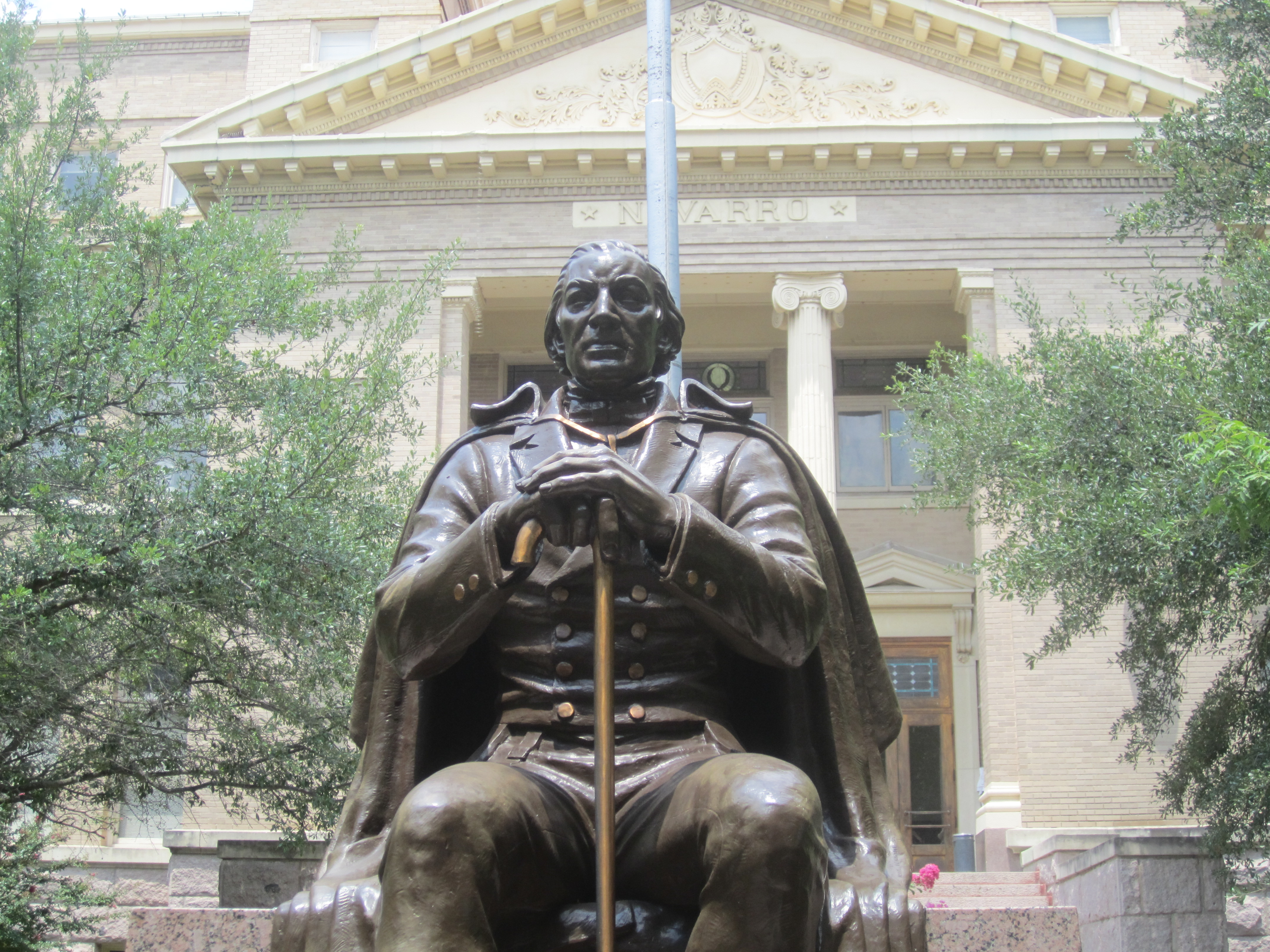
Navarro statue at the Navarro County Courthouse in Corsicana, Texas

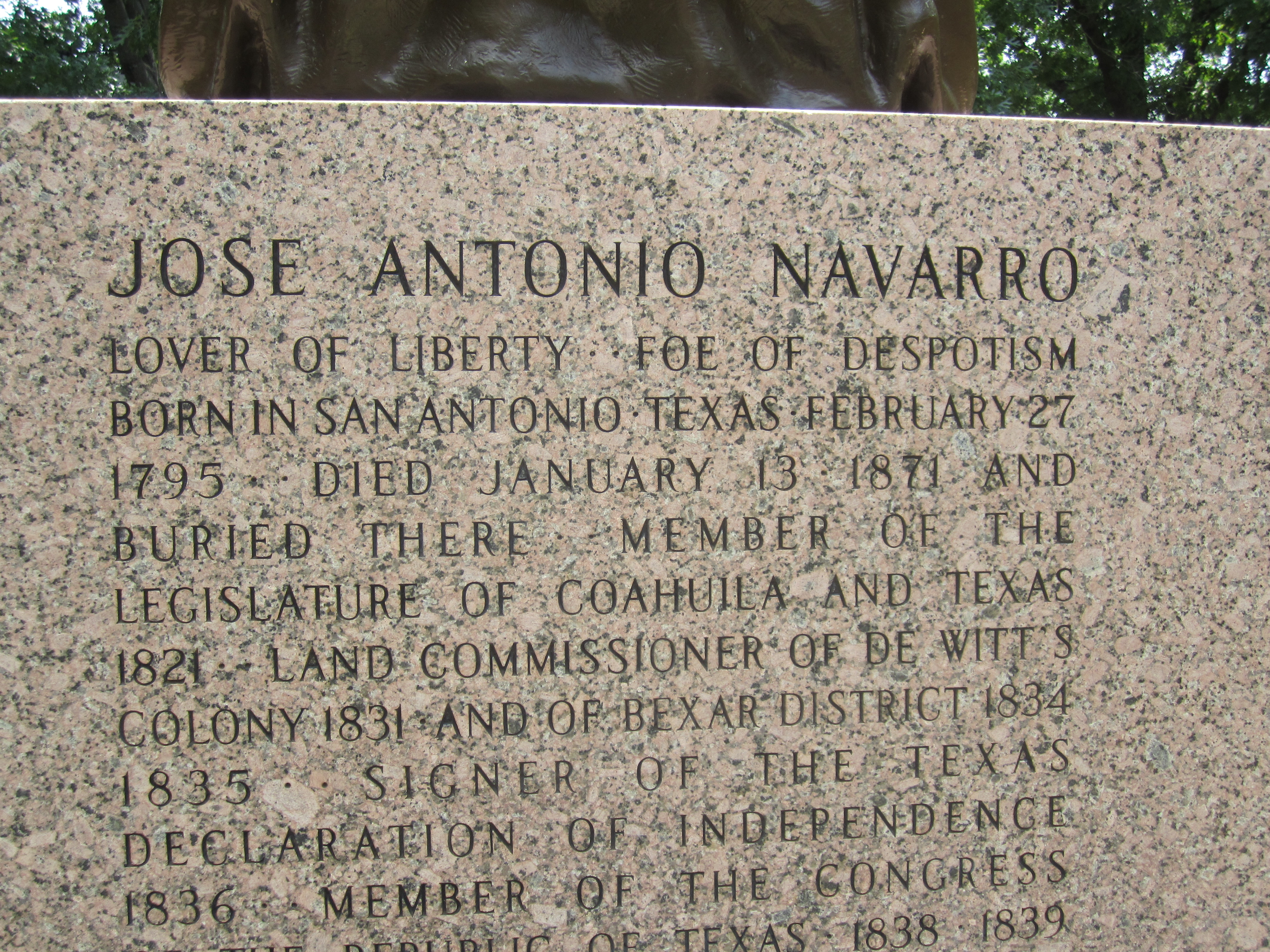
Inscription on base of statue depicts Navarro as a "Lover of Liberty" and a "Foe of Despotism."

José Antonio Navarro (February 27, 1795 – January 13, 1871) was a Texas statesman, revolutionary, rancher, and merchant. The son of Ángel Navarro and Josefa María Ruiz y Peña, he was born into a distinguished noble family at San Antonio de Béxar in the Viceroyalty of New Spain (now the American city of San Antonio, Texas). His uncle was José Francisco Ruiz and his brother-in-law was Juan Martín de Veramendi.

Navarro County, Texas, established in 1846, is named in his honor, as is the small town of Navarro, Texas.

== Early life and career ==
Navarro was proficient in the laws of Mexico and Spain, although he was mainly self-educated. As a native Texan, he had a vision of the future of Texas like that of Stephen F. Austin. Austin and he developed a steady friendship, and worked together to find the new state of Texas. An early proponent of Texas independence, he took part in the 1812–1813 Magee, Gutiérrez, and Toledo resistance movement.

Working with the empresarios of the period, he helped Austin obtain his contracts to bring settlers into the area. He became a land commissioner for Dewitt's Colony, and soon after, for the Béxar District. In 1825, he married Margarita de la Garza and they raised seven children. His son José Ángel Navarro III served three terms in the Texas Legislature.

During the early 1830s, Navarro represented Texas both in the legislature of the state of Coahuila y Tejas and in the federal Congress in Mexico City. Always a champion of democratic ideas, Navarro, collaborating with Austin, worked to pass legislation that would best benefit the people of Texas.

Navarro later served as a leader in the Texas Revolution. He was at the Convention for Texas Independence, when he received the news from Juan Seguin of the Alamo's fall. With the death of James Bowie (his nephew by marriage), Navarro had to secure the release of the surviving Navarros, two women and a child, who were being held by the Mexicans at the Músquiz house. They were removed to the Navarro family home. The surviving noncombatants thereby avoided humiliation or death from General Antonio López de Santa Anna.

José Antonio Navarro was one of the first signers of the Texas Declaration of Independence, in early March, 1836, in Washington-on-the-Brazos. He later signed the Constitution of the Republic of Texas.

In 1841, Navarro reluctantly participated in the ill-conceived Texan Santa Fe Expedition sent by President Mirabeau B. Lamar, when he tried to persuade the residents of New Mexico to secede from Mexico and join with Texas. He was captured, put on trial, sentenced to death, and imprisoned for years. He escaped with the help of sympathetic Mexican Army officials, sailing back to Texas.

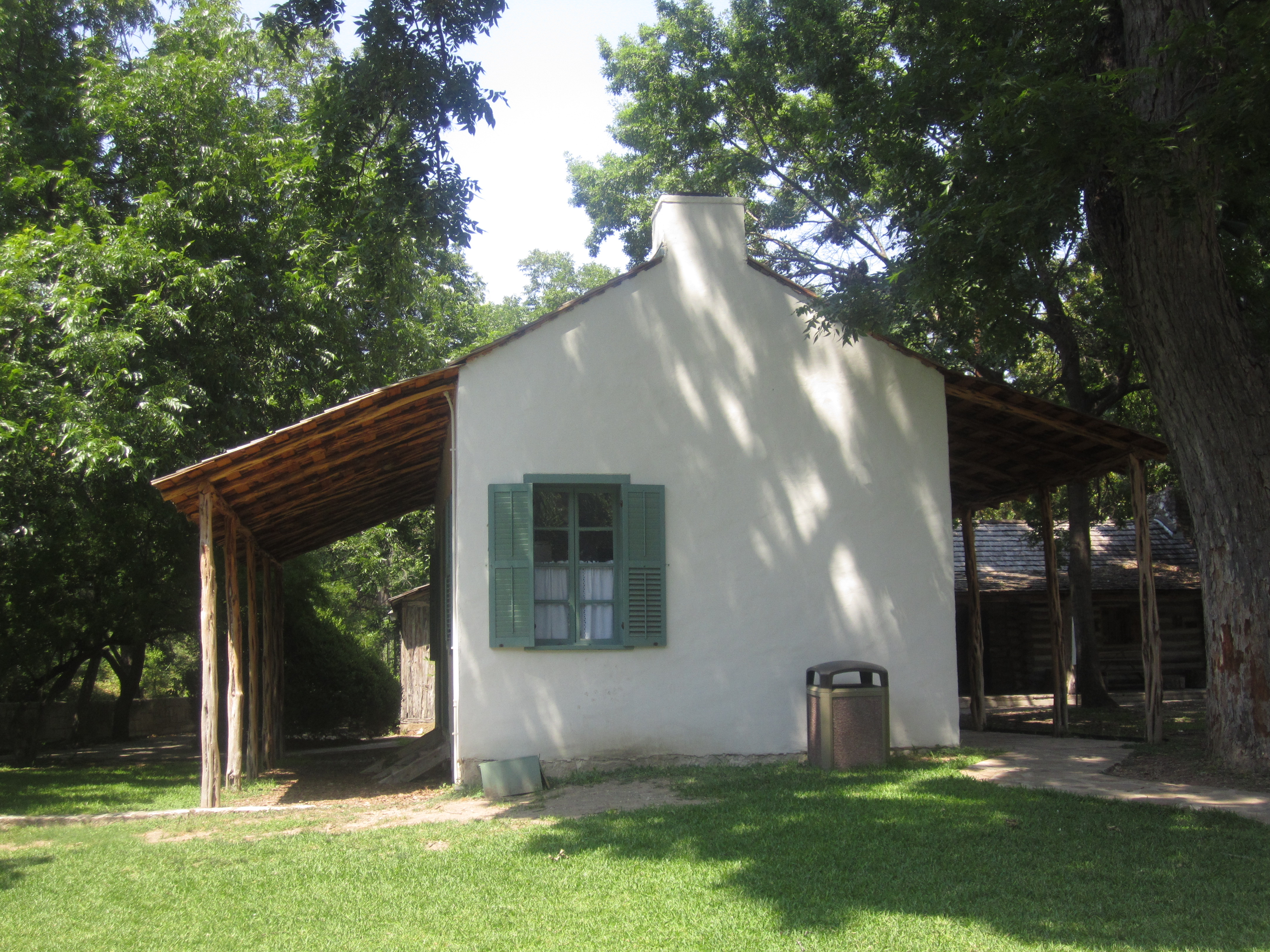
In 1835, Navarro built the Celso-Navarro House, relocated to the Witte Museum in San Antonio, where it houses some administrative offices.

José Antonio Navarro became a representative in the Republic of Texas Congress from Bexar County, Texas. Attempting to keep a balance of power, he worked closely with Senator Juan Seguin to promote legislation favorable to the Tejano citizenry, who were quickly becoming the political minority. Education was one such priority, working to bring academic institutions into the San Antonio area. He supported the annexation of Texas by the United States. In 1845, Navarro was instrumental in drafting the first state Constitution of Texas, ensuring future political rights for all people. He served two terms in the Texas Senate before retiring from politics in 1849.

== Slave ownership ==
Like a number of other Tejanos, Navarro enslaved African Americans. Between 1856 and 1864, he owned between six and nine enslaved people. As a legislator in the Mexican state of Coahuila y Tejas, Navarro introduced a bill known as the "Law of Contracts" which allowed enslaved people to be brought to Texas as indentured servants under contract, working to pay their debt in labor to their owners. Census records indicate that as early as 1850, Navarro owned an enslaved twelve-year-old boy named Henry.

== Later life ==
In his retirement, Navarro wrote several historical and political essays about Texas and San Antonio's role in the Mexican Independence movement for the San Antonio Ledger.

Ranching occupied much of his time in later years, and he spent most of each spring, summer, and fall on the 6,000-acre (24 km^{2}) San Geronimo Ranch, rich grasslands near Seguin, Texas, about 35 miles east of San Antonio.

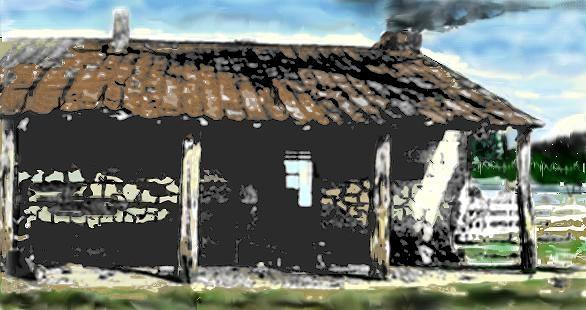
Navarro's ranch on Geronimo Creek, near Geronimo, Texas, and north of Seguin, Texas. An early concrete house, it has been demolished.

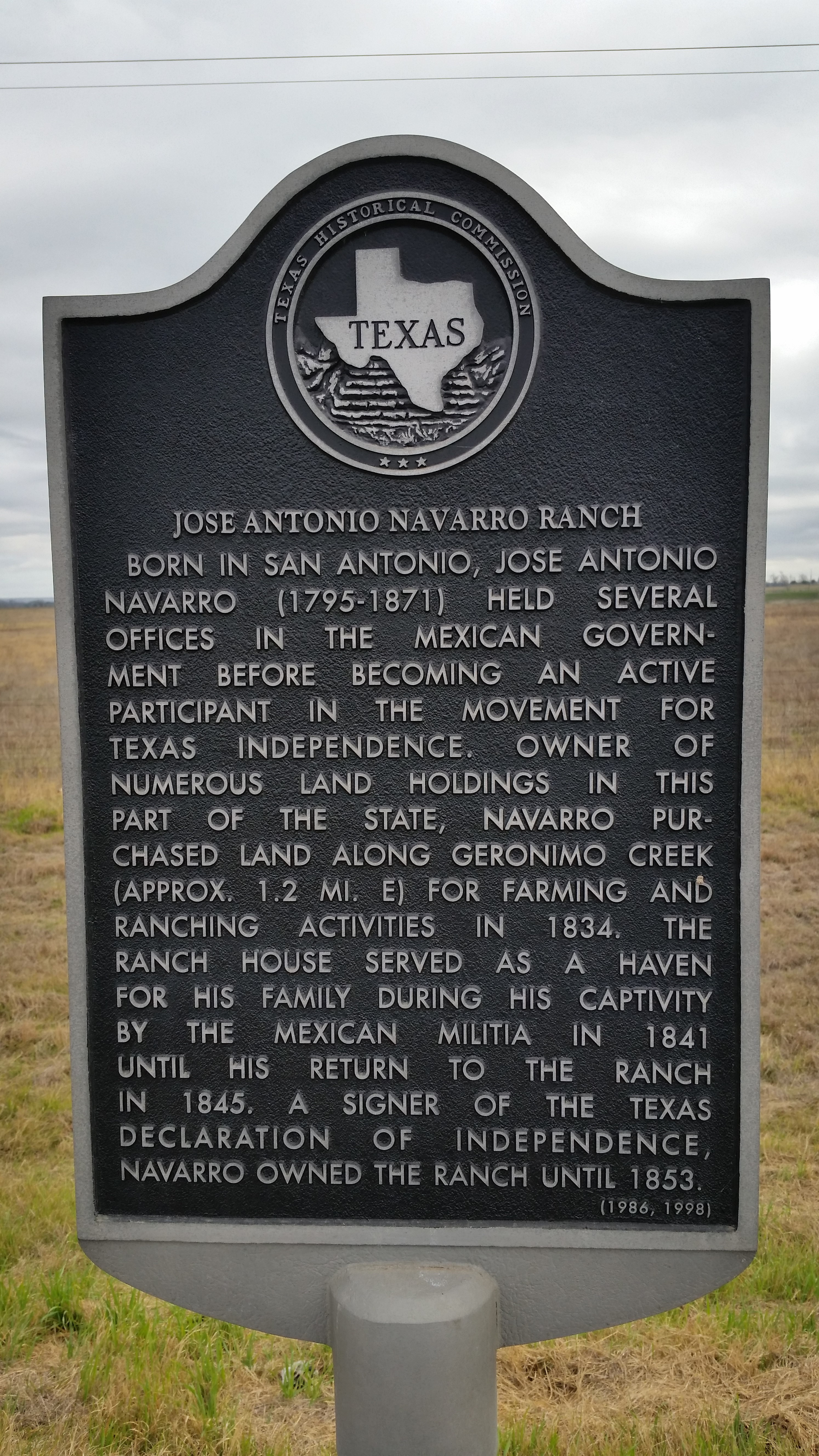
Navarro Ranch Texas Historical Marker south of Geronimo

Navarro later sold his ranch and lived full-time in San Antonio, where he died in 1871.

== Legacy ==
In 1846, the Texas Legislature named Navarro County south of Dallas to honor his service. In 1848, Navarro County's seat of government was founded, and José Navarro selected the name, Corsicana, for the town.

A state historical marker identifies his Geronimo Creek Ranch in South Texas. Navarro Street in downtown San Antonio is also named for him.

Casa Navarro State Historic Site in San Antonio is the original residence complex of José Antonio Navarro. He first bought the property, about 1.5 acres, in 1832 (during the Mexican Texas period. The structures of limestone, caliche block, and adobe were built over the next 20 years or so. The site is situated in the heart of old San Antonio. The buildings were acquired and restored by the San Antonio Conservation Society, and the complex, including his one-story limestone home, kitchen, and a two-story store and offices, was opened to the public in October 1997.

== Tejanos who served under Juan Seguín ==
Tejano volunteers under Juan Seguín

Tejano volunteers under the command of Juan Seguín for all or part of their service in the Texas Revolution and the Republic of Texas. Note that Seguin's men at the Alamo were scouts/couriers going in and out, between San Antonio and nearby Gonzales, the rallying point for volunteers.

Siege of Béxar

- Juan Abamillo
- José Alamedo
- José María Arocha
- Juan José Arocha
- Plácido Benavides
- Juan Antonio Badillo
- Manuel Bueno
- Clemente Bustillos
- Mateo Casillas
- Pablo Casillas
- Luis Castañon
- Agapito Cervantes
- Carlos Chacón
- Miguel Cilba
- Ciriaco Contes
- Julian Contes
- Antonio Cruz y Arocha
- Antonio Curvier (aka Curbier)
- Domingo Díaz
- Francisco Díaz
- Julian Díaz
- José Gregorio Esparza
- Ignacio Espinoza
- Manuel N. Flores
- Salvador Flores
- Antonio Fuentes
- Manuel Gallardo
- Pedro Gaona
- Casimiro García
- Clemente García
- Guadalupe García
- Jesus García
- Simon García
- Alexandro de la Garza
- José María de la Garza
- Marcelino de la Garza
- Paulino de la Garza
- Francisco Gómez
- Jesús Gómez
- Gabriel Gonzalez
- Brigido Guerrero
- Antonio Hernández
- Eduardo Hernández
- Gregorio Hernández
- Blas María Herrera
- Pedro Herrera
- Toribio Herrera
- Damacio Jiménez
- José Domingo Losoya
- Toribio Losoya
- Juan Maldonado
- José María Mancha
- Pablo Mansolo
- Francisco Miranda
- Andrés Nava
- Nepomuceno Navarro
- Juan José Palacios
- Eduardo Ramirez
- Vicente Ramos
- Ambrosio Rodríguez
- Ramón Rubio
- Antonio Ruiz
- Esmerigeldo Ruiz
- Francisco Salinas
- Miguel (Margil) Salinas
- Pablo Salinas
- Agapito Tejado
- Francisco Valdéz
- Esteban Villarreal
- José Zúñiga

Battle of the Alamo

- Juan Abamillo
- Simón Arreola
- Juan Antonio Badillo
- José María Arocha
- Juan María Cabrera
- Cesario Carmona
- Antonio Cruz y Arocha
- José Gregorio Esparza
- Antonio Fuentes
- Alexandro de la Garza
- Brigido Guerrero
- Damacio Jiménez (aka Ximenes)
- Jose Maria Jimenez
- Toribio Losoya
- Andrés Nava
- Jose Sebastian Pacheco (aka Luciano Granado)
- Marcos Veramendi

Battle of San Jacinto

- José María Arocha
- Manuel Arocha (aka Manuel de Arocha)
- Simón Arreola
- Andre Bárcinas
- Manuel Bueno
- Juan María Cabrera
- Cesario Carmona
- Gabriel Casillas
- Cayetano Castillo
- Antonio Cruz y Arocha
- Francisco Cuellar
- Antonio Curvier (aka Curbier)
- Fernando Curvier (aka Curbier)
- Matias Curvier (aka Curbier)
- Lucio Enriquez (aka Enriques)
- Manuel N. Flores
- Martin Flores
- Nepomuceno Flores
- Pedro Flores
- Salvador Flores
- Pedro Herrera
- Jose Maria Jimenez
- Juan Jimenez
- Jose Polinio Lavjina
- Narcisco Leal
- Juan Lopez
- Pedro Lopez
- Martin Maldonado
- Tomás Maldonado
- José María Mancha
- Juan Martinez
- Tomas Martinez
- Miguel Mata
- José Antonio Menchaca
- Jose Molina
- Manuel Montalvo
- Crecensio Montez
- Hipolito Montoya
- Antonio Olivas
- Nepomuceno Navarro
- Jacinto Peña
- Damacio de los Reyes
- Eduardo Ramirez
- Ambrosio Rodríguez
- Jose Antonio Rodríguez
- Pablo Salinas
- Manuel Antonio Santiago Tarin
- Antonio Treviño
- Esteban Uran
- Andres Varcinas
- Juan Zambrano
- Vicente Zepeda

Republic of Texas service post-San Jacinto

- Eusebio Almaguez
- Miguel Arcieniega Jr.
- Andre Bárcinas
- Antonio Benites
- Anselmo Bergara
- Manuel Bueno
- Pedro Camarillo
- Mariano Carbajal
- Ignacio Castillo
- Nemecio de la Cerda
- Agapito Cervantes
- Augustin Chaves
- Antonio Conix
- Simón Contreras
- Trinidad Coy
- Antonio Cruz y Arocha
- Antonio Curvier (aka Curbier)
- Nicholas Delgado
- Polonio Díaz
- Ignacio Espinoza
- Antonio Estrada
- Manuel Estrada
- Eusibio Farias
- Manuel N. Flores
- Martin Flores
- Nepomuceno Flores
- Salvador Flores
- Agapio Gaitan
- Damacio Galban
- Leandro Garza
- Vicente Garza
- Manuel Hernández
- Felipe Jaimes
- José María Landera
- Xavier Lazo
- Cayetano Lerma
- Manuel Lopez
- Juan Maldonado
- Gabriel Martinez
- Manuel Martinez
- Miguel Mata
- Manuel Montalvo
- Manuel Montate
- Francisco Morales
- Pedro Flores Morales
- José Antonio Navarro
- José Luciano Navarro
- Jacinto Peña
- James Quina
- Eduardo Ramirez
- José María Rios
- Cayetano Rivas
- Ambrosio Rodríguez
- Francisco Rodríguez
- Juan Rodríguez
- Mariano Romano
- Cristobal Rubio
- Antonio Ruiz
- Franco Ruiz
- Antonio Sambraño
- Antonio Sanches
- Guadalupe de los Santos
- Nicolas de los Santos
- Juan Sombraña
- Gregorio Sota
- Ramon Trevino
- José María Valdéz
- Juan Vallanceon
- Marcos Veramendi
- Antonio Hernandez Zavala
- Jesus Zavala

Sources:

- "San Jacinto Museum of History - The Kemp Sketches". San Jacinto Museum of History.
- MacDonald, L. Lloyd (2009). Tejanos in the 1835 Texas Revolution. Pelican Publishing. pp. 260–262. ISBN 978-1589806382.
- Teja, Jesus F. De la; Matovina, Timothy; Poché, Justin (2013). Recollections of a Tejano Life: Antonio Menchaca in Texas History. University of Texas Press. p. 90. ISBN 978-0292748651.
- Texas State Archives, Republic of Texas Claims
- Texas A & M professor Wallace L. McKeehan, also on the school's Board of Regents website: Hispanic Texian Patriots in the Struggle for Independence
- Handbook of Texas

== Further reading and viewing ==
- Lindley, Thomas Ricks (2003). Alamo Traces: New Evidence and New Conclusions. Lanham, MD: Republic of Texas Press. ISBN 1-55622-983-6.
- Ramos, Raul A. (2008). Beyond the Alamo, forging Mexican ethnicity in San Antonio, 1821–1861. NC: University of North Carolina Press. ISBN 978-0-8078-3207-3.
- Martinez de Vara, Art (2020). Tejano Patriot: The Revolutionary Life of Jose Francisco Ruiz, 1783 - 1840. Austin, TX: Texas State Historical Association Press. ISBN 978-1625110589.
- David McDonald, Jose Antonio Navarro: In Search of the American Dream in Nineteenth-Century Texas, Texas State Historical Association, 2011.
- Defending Mexican Valor in Texas: Jose Antonio Navarro's Historical Writings, 1853–1857, Jose Antonio Navarro, David R. McDonald, Timothy M. Matovina, State House Press, October 1995, ISBN 978-1-880510-31-5.
- In Storms of Fortune: The Public Life of José Antonio Navarro, written by Anastacio Bueno, M.A. thesis, University of Texas at San Antonio, 1978.
- Jose Antonio Navarro, co-creator of Texas, Baylor University Press, 1969, 127 pages, ASIN: B0006CAIBS.
- Remember the Alamo, American Experience; PBS documentary program (video recording), 2004.\==Further reading and viewing==

Texas Senate
Preceded by none	Texas State Senator from District 18; 1846–1849	Succeeded by Alexander H. Phillips
