= José Gregorio Esparza =

Last Texan defender to enter the Alamo

- Born: February 25, 1802; San Antonio, Spanish Texas
- Died: March 6, 1836 (aged 34); San Antonio de Béxar, Republic of Texas
- Spouse: Ana Salazar
- Military career
- Allegiance: Republic of Texas
- Branch: Texas Militia
- Unit: Capt. Juan Seguín Company
- Conflicts: Texas Revolution: Siege of Béxar; Battle of the Alamo †

José Gregorio Esparza (February 25, 1802 – March 6, 1836), also known as Gregorio Esparza, was the last Texan defender to enter the Alamo during the early days of March 1836 in the Siege of the Alamo and was the only one that was not burned in the pyres. He had brought his family into the Alamo compound along with him. They were able to survive the battle and were not executed by the conquering army.

== Early life and family ==
He was born on February 25, 1802, in San Antonio de Béxar, the child of Juan Antonio and Maria Petra (Olivas) Esparza. He married Ana (Anna) Salazar, they had a daughter and three sons. His family was also in the Alamo during the siege and were eventually freed after it.

== Texas Revolution ==
Esparza joined the volunteer Texan Army. He traveled to La Bahia and joined with the forces gathered by Plácido Benavides who participated in the Battle of Goliad #1 and would align with James Bowie while he was at Goliad. The company then proceeded to San Antonio where they joined up under Juan Seguín's command in October 1835. There he participated on December 5 through 9 in the house to house fighting, taking the plazas on the north side of Béxar. He served up through December 10, when General Martín Perfecto de Cos surrendered.

General Antonio López de Santa Anna was fast approaching San Antonio. John W. Smith had suggested that Esparza should gather Ana with the family and move to Nacogdoches, but time ran short and on the evening of February 23, he with his family entered at night through a window in the Alamo compound. He was an avid supporter of James Bowie and would not leave the Alamo when given the chance during an armistice, probably due to this relationship. In the Alamo he commanded artillery at the rear of the chapel, where he died on March 6, 1836. His Brother, Francisco, although a soldier in Santa Anna's army, did not participate in the battle but requested to locate his brother and was allowed to search through the bodies in the Alamo. He found the body shot and stabbed in the Alamo Chapel. His body was the only one of the defenders allowed to receive a Christian burial. He was buried by his brothers in the Campo Santo cemetery in San Antonio.

== Esparza survivors of the Battle of the Alamo ==
His family members were spared and are listed as official non-combatant survivors of the Battle of the Alamo. María de Jesús Castro also known as María de Jesús Esparza was the young step daughter of Esparza, who was also spared after the battle. His wife, Ana Esparza died in 1847, and the family was left without parents. Between 1850 and 1860, Gregorio's sons, Enrique, Manuel and Francisco filed pension petitions to gain the rights to land at Pleasanton, Texas. Enrique, a San Antonio truck-farmer, also in the Alamo during the siege, was rediscovered in 1901 and became a recorded eyewitness of what transpired during the siege. His brother, Manuel owned a general store in Pleasanton, and later served in the Confederate Army during the Civil War. Francisco would also serve in the Confederate Army and later became a Texas Ranger. He eventually moved to Tucson, Arizona, and became a law officer in the area.

== Dedication ==
In 1970, Northside Independent School District purchased 10 acres from Science Park to open an elementary school. Because the school was built in the Culebra Park subdivision, the district planned to call the school, "Culebra Park Elementary". Members of the community then joined and petitioned the school board to name the school for a famous Hispanic individual since the neighborhood was predominately Hispanic. After extensive research, it was decided that the Alamo hero, Gregorio Esparza, would be an appropriate namesake for the school.

And thus, Gregorio Esparza Elementary School opened in early 1972 & is located near the Far West Side of San Antonio at 5700 Hemphill Drive.

== See also ==
- List of Texan survivors of the Battle of the Alamo

== Tejanos who served under Juan Seguín ==
Tejano volunteers under Juan Seguín

Tejano volunteers under the command of Juan Seguín for all or part of their service in the Texas Revolution and the Republic of Texas. Note that Seguin's men at the Alamo were scouts/couriers going in and out, between San Antonio and nearby Gonzales, the rallying point for volunteers.

Siege of Béxar

- Juan Abamillo
- José Alamedo
- José María Arocha
- Juan José Arocha
- Plácido Benavides
- Juan Antonio Badillo
- Manuel Bueno
- Clemente Bustillos
- Mateo Casillas
- Pablo Casillas
- Luis Castañon
- Agapito Cervantes
- Carlos Chacón
- Miguel Cilba
- Ciriaco Contes
- Julian Contes
- Antonio Cruz y Arocha
- Antonio Curvier (aka Curbier)
- Domingo Díaz
- Francisco Díaz
- Julian Díaz
- José Gregorio Esparza
- Ignacio Espinoza
- Manuel N. Flores
- Salvador Flores
- Antonio Fuentes
- Manuel Gallardo
- Pedro Gaona
- Casimiro García
- Clemente García
- Guadalupe García
- Jesus García
- Simon García
- Alexandro de la Garza
- José María de la Garza
- Marcelino de la Garza
- Paulino de la Garza
- Francisco Gómez
- Jesús Gómez
- Gabriel Gonzalez
- Brigido Guerrero
- Antonio Hernández
- Eduardo Hernández
- Gregorio Hernández
- Blas María Herrera
- Pedro Herrera
- Toribio Herrera
- Damacio Jiménez
- José Domingo Losoya
- Toribio Losoya
- Juan Maldonado
- José María Mancha
- Pablo Mansolo
- Francisco Miranda
- Andrés Nava
- Nepomuceno Navarro
- Juan José Palacios
- Eduardo Ramirez
- Vicente Ramos
- Ambrosio Rodríguez
- Ramón Rubio
- Antonio Ruiz
- Esmerigeldo Ruiz
- Francisco Salinas
- Miguel (Margil) Salinas
- Pablo Salinas
- Agapito Tejado
- Francisco Valdéz
- Esteban Villarreal
- José Zúñiga

Battle of the Alamo

- Juan Abamillo
- Simón Arreola
- Juan Antonio Badillo
- José María Arocha
- Juan María Cabrera
- Cesario Carmona
- Antonio Cruz y Arocha
- José Gregorio Esparza
- Antonio Fuentes
- Alexandro de la Garza
- Brigido Guerrero
- Damacio Jiménez (aka Ximenes)
- Jose Maria Jimenez
- Toribio Losoya
- Andrés Nava
- Jose Sebastian Pacheco (aka Luciano Granado)
- Marcos Veramendi

Battle of San Jacinto

- José María Arocha
- Manuel Arocha (aka Manuel de Arocha)
- Simón Arreola
- Andre Bárcinas
- Manuel Bueno
- Juan María Cabrera
- Cesario Carmona
- Gabriel Casillas
- Cayetano Castillo
- Antonio Cruz y Arocha
- Francisco Cuellar
- Antonio Curvier (aka Curbier)
- Fernando Curvier (aka Curbier)
- Matias Curvier (aka Curbier)
- Lucio Enriquez (aka Enriques)
- Manuel N. Flores
- Martin Flores
- Nepomuceno Flores
- Pedro Flores
- Salvador Flores
- Pedro Herrera
- Jose Maria Jimenez
- Juan Jimenez
- Jose Polinio Lavjina
- Narcisco Leal
- Juan Lopez
- Pedro Lopez
- Martin Maldonado
- Tomás Maldonado
- José María Mancha
- Juan Martinez
- Tomas Martinez
- Miguel Mata
- José Antonio Menchaca
- Jose Molina
- Manuel Montalvo
- Crecensio Montez
- Hipolito Montoya
- Antonio Olivas
- Nepomuceno Navarro
- Jacinto Peña
- Damacio de los Reyes
- Eduardo Ramirez
- Ambrosio Rodríguez
- Jose Antonio Rodríguez
- Pablo Salinas
- Manuel Antonio Santiago Tarin
- Antonio Treviño
- Esteban Uran
- Andres Varcinas
- Juan Zambrano
- Vicente Zepeda

Republic of Texas service post-San Jacinto

- Eusebio Almaguez
- Miguel Arcieniega Jr.
- Andre Bárcinas
- Antonio Benites
- Anselmo Bergara
- Manuel Bueno
- Pedro Camarillo
- Mariano Carbajal
- Ignacio Castillo
- Nemecio de la Cerda
- Agapito Cervantes
- Augustin Chaves
- Antonio Conix
- Simón Contreras
- Trinidad Coy
- Antonio Cruz y Arocha
- Antonio Curvier (aka Curbier)
- Nicholas Delgado
- Polonio Díaz
- Ignacio Espinoza
- Antonio Estrada
- Manuel Estrada
- Eusibio Farias
- Manuel N. Flores
- Martin Flores
- Nepomuceno Flores
- Salvador Flores
- Agapio Gaitan
- Damacio Galban
- Leandro Garza
- Vicente Garza
- Manuel Hernández
- Felipe Jaimes
- José María Landera
- Xavier Lazo
- Cayetano Lerma
- Manuel Lopez
- Juan Maldonado
- Gabriel Martinez
- Manuel Martinez
- Miguel Mata
- Manuel Montalvo
- Manuel Montate
- Francisco Morales
- Pedro Flores Morales
- José Antonio Navarro
- José Luciano Navarro
- Jacinto Peña
- James Quina
- Eduardo Ramirez
- José María Rios
- Cayetano Rivas
- Ambrosio Rodríguez
- Francisco Rodríguez
- Juan Rodríguez
- Mariano Romano
- Cristobal Rubio
- Antonio Ruiz
- Franco Ruiz
- Antonio Sambraño
- Antonio Sanches
- Guadalupe de los Santos
- Nicolas de los Santos
- Juan Sombraña
- Gregorio Sota
- Ramon Trevino
- José María Valdéz
- Juan Vallanceon
- Marcos Veramendi
- Antonio Hernandez Zavala
- Jesus Zavala

Sources:

- "San Jacinto Museum of History - The Kemp Sketches". San Jacinto Museum of History.
- MacDonald, L. Lloyd (2009). Tejanos in the 1835 Texas Revolution. Pelican Publishing. pp. 260–262. ISBN 978-1589806382.
- Teja, Jesus F. De la; Matovina, Timothy; Poché, Justin (2013). Recollections of a Tejano Life: Antonio Menchaca in Texas History. University of Texas Press. p. 90. ISBN 978-0292748651.
- Texas State Archives, Republic of Texas Claims
- Texas A & M professor Wallace L. McKeehan, also on the school's Board of Regents website: Hispanic Texian Patriots in the Struggle for Independence
- Handbook of Texas

== Citations ==
Citations
