= Manuel Antonio Santiago Tarin =

- Born: 1811; San Antonio de Béjar, New Spain (now San Antonio, Texas, U.S.)
- Died: 1849 (aged 37–38); Texas
- Occupation: soldier

Manuel Antonio Santiago Tarín (1811–1849) (also known as Manuel Leal) was a Mexican soldier and a recruiter and participant in the Texas Revolution on the Texian side.

== Early life ==
He was born in San Antonio de Béxar (now San Antonio, Texas, United States). He married María Luisa Cásares by 1846 and had at least two children.

The son of a military officer, Vicente Tarín and his wife, Juana Isidora Leal, he was grandson of rancher Joaquin Leal and great-great-grandson of Juan Leal, first alcalde (mayor) of San Antonio. Tarín was baptized at the San Antonio de Valero Mission (the Alamo) two days after his birth.

In 1813, there was much political turmoil in the region. His father, a Spanish officer, joined the invasion forces of the Gutiérrez-Magee Expedition. After the defeat at the battle of Medina, he fled the Spanish repercussions. He went into exile in the Louisiana territory leaving Manuel and his mother in the care of a Catholic priest. Though his father was given a conditional pardon in 1814, he refused it and chose to remain in exile, continuing in the rebellion against the Spanish crown.

By 1830, Manuel Tarín became a soldier in the Second Flying Company of San Carlos de Parras (Álamo de Parras), serving first at the Alamo and then Fort Tenoxtitlán. The Mexican government's failed support of its frontier outposts forced its men and their families to suffer under the harshest of conditions. Tarín deserted twice, but was returned to duty both times. His unit ultimately returned to San Antonio and the Alamo.

== Texas Revolution ==
Tarín was largely dissatisfied with the Mexican army as was demonstrated when he was apprehended with his own brother, José Vicente and other accomplices after trying to steal guns and ammunition from the Alamo stores.

By 1835, he deserted the Mexican army and enlisted in the Texas army. On February 22, 1836, Tarin mustered into Juan N. Seguín's company of Tejanos. Salvador Flores and Manuel Leal recruiting and organizing 41 Tejano volunteers from ranches southwest of San Antonio reinforced the Texan forces on the Salado Creek, in mid October, a few days after Juan Seguin and Plácido Benavides of Victoria had gathered almost 70 men to aid Commander Stephen F. Austin. He fought at the siege of Béxar under the command of Stephen F. Austin. Although traveling with Seguín to the Battle of San Jacinto, illness prevented him from being in the final fight.

Tarín left the military in July 1837. For his service as a Corporal with the Texas army, he was awarded several hundred acres in donation land grants and bounty warrants.

He died sometime after 1849.

== Tejanos who served under Juan Seguín ==
Tejano volunteers under Juan Seguín

Tejano volunteers under the command of Juan Seguín for all or part of their service in the Texas Revolution and the Republic of Texas. Note that Seguin's men at the Alamo were scouts/couriers going in and out, between San Antonio and nearby Gonzales, the rallying point for volunteers.

Siege of Béxar

- Juan Abamillo
- José Alamedo
- José María Arocha
- Juan José Arocha
- Plácido Benavides
- Juan Antonio Badillo
- Manuel Bueno
- Clemente Bustillos
- Mateo Casillas
- Pablo Casillas
- Luis Castañon
- Agapito Cervantes
- Carlos Chacón
- Miguel Cilba
- Ciriaco Contes
- Julian Contes
- Antonio Cruz y Arocha
- Antonio Curvier (aka Curbier)
- Domingo Díaz
- Francisco Díaz
- Julian Díaz
- José Gregorio Esparza
- Ignacio Espinoza
- Manuel N. Flores
- Salvador Flores
- Antonio Fuentes
- Manuel Gallardo
- Pedro Gaona
- Casimiro García
- Clemente García
- Guadalupe García
- Jesus García
- Simon García
- Alexandro de la Garza
- José María de la Garza
- Marcelino de la Garza
- Paulino de la Garza
- Francisco Gómez
- Jesús Gómez
- Gabriel Gonzalez
- Brigido Guerrero
- Antonio Hernández
- Eduardo Hernández
- Gregorio Hernández
- Blas María Herrera
- Pedro Herrera
- Toribio Herrera
- Damacio Jiménez
- José Domingo Losoya
- Toribio Losoya
- Juan Maldonado
- José María Mancha
- Pablo Mansolo
- Francisco Miranda
- Andrés Nava
- Nepomuceno Navarro
- Juan José Palacios
- Eduardo Ramirez
- Vicente Ramos
- Ambrosio Rodríguez
- Ramón Rubio
- Antonio Ruiz
- Esmerigeldo Ruiz
- Francisco Salinas
- Miguel (Margil) Salinas
- Pablo Salinas
- Agapito Tejado
- Francisco Valdéz
- Esteban Villarreal
- José Zúñiga

Battle of the Alamo

- Juan Abamillo
- Simón Arreola
- Juan Antonio Badillo
- José María Arocha
- Juan María Cabrera
- Cesario Carmona
- Antonio Cruz y Arocha
- José Gregorio Esparza
- Antonio Fuentes
- Alexandro de la Garza
- Brigido Guerrero
- Damacio Jiménez (aka Ximenes)
- Jose Maria Jimenez
- Toribio Losoya
- Andrés Nava
- Jose Sebastian Pacheco (aka Luciano Granado)
- Marcos Veramendi

Battle of San Jacinto

- José María Arocha
- Manuel Arocha (aka Manuel de Arocha)
- Simón Arreola
- Andre Bárcinas
- Manuel Bueno
- Juan María Cabrera
- Cesario Carmona
- Gabriel Casillas
- Cayetano Castillo
- Antonio Cruz y Arocha
- Francisco Cuellar
- Antonio Curvier (aka Curbier)
- Fernando Curvier (aka Curbier)
- Matias Curvier (aka Curbier)
- Lucio Enriquez (aka Enriques)
- Manuel N. Flores
- Martin Flores
- Nepomuceno Flores
- Pedro Flores
- Salvador Flores
- Pedro Herrera
- Jose Maria Jimenez
- Juan Jimenez
- Jose Polinio Lavjina
- Narcisco Leal
- Juan Lopez
- Pedro Lopez
- Martin Maldonado
- Tomás Maldonado
- José María Mancha
- Juan Martinez
- Tomas Martinez
- Miguel Mata
- José Antonio Menchaca
- Jose Molina
- Manuel Montalvo
- Crecensio Montez
- Hipolito Montoya
- Antonio Olivas
- Nepomuceno Navarro
- Jacinto Peña
- Damacio de los Reyes
- Eduardo Ramirez
- Ambrosio Rodríguez
- Jose Antonio Rodríguez
- Pablo Salinas
- Manuel Antonio Santiago Tarin
- Antonio Treviño
- Esteban Uran
- Andres Varcinas
- Juan Zambrano
- Vicente Zepeda

Republic of Texas service post-San Jacinto

- Eusebio Almaguez
- Miguel Arcieniega Jr.
- Andre Bárcinas
- Antonio Benites
- Anselmo Bergara
- Manuel Bueno
- Pedro Camarillo
- Mariano Carbajal
- Ignacio Castillo
- Nemecio de la Cerda
- Agapito Cervantes
- Augustin Chaves
- Antonio Conix
- Simón Contreras
- Trinidad Coy
- Antonio Cruz y Arocha
- Antonio Curvier (aka Curbier)
- Nicholas Delgado
- Polonio Díaz
- Ignacio Espinoza
- Antonio Estrada
- Manuel Estrada
- Eusibio Farias
- Manuel N. Flores
- Martin Flores
- Nepomuceno Flores
- Salvador Flores
- Agapio Gaitan
- Damacio Galban
- Leandro Garza
- Vicente Garza
- Manuel Hernández
- Felipe Jaimes
- José María Landera
- Xavier Lazo
- Cayetano Lerma
- Manuel Lopez
- Juan Maldonado
- Gabriel Martinez
- Manuel Martinez
- Miguel Mata
- Manuel Montalvo
- Manuel Montate
- Francisco Morales
- Pedro Flores Morales
- José Antonio Navarro
- José Luciano Navarro
- Jacinto Peña
- James Quina
- Eduardo Ramirez
- José María Rios
- Cayetano Rivas
- Ambrosio Rodríguez
- Francisco Rodríguez
- Juan Rodríguez
- Mariano Romano
- Cristobal Rubio
- Antonio Ruiz
- Franco Ruiz
- Antonio Sambraño
- Antonio Sanches
- Guadalupe de los Santos
- Nicolas de los Santos
- Juan Sombraña
- Gregorio Sota
- Ramon Trevino
- José María Valdéz
- Juan Vallanceon
- Marcos Veramendi
- Antonio Hernandez Zavala
- Jesus Zavala

Sources:

- "San Jacinto Museum of History - The Kemp Sketches". San Jacinto Museum of History.
- MacDonald, L. Lloyd (2009). Tejanos in the 1835 Texas Revolution. Pelican Publishing. pp. 260–262. ISBN 978-1589806382.
- Teja, Jesus F. De la; Matovina, Timothy; Poché, Justin (2013). Recollections of a Tejano Life: Antonio Menchaca in Texas History. University of Texas Press. p. 90. ISBN 978-0292748651.
- Texas State Archives, Republic of Texas Claims
- Texas A & M professor Wallace L. McKeehan, also on the school's Board of Regents website: Hispanic Texian Patriots in the Struggle for Independence
- Handbook of Texas
