= Plácido Benavides =

- Born: 1810; Reynosa, Tamaulipas, New Spain
- Died: 1837 (aged 27); Opelousas, Louisiana, U.S.
- Occupation: Politician
- Known for: Freedom fighter
- Spouse: Agustina De León
- Children: Pilar; Librada; Matiana

Plácido Benavides (1810–1837) was an early Mexican-born settler in De Leon's Colony, Victoria County, Texas. Benavides earned himself the sobriquet of the Paul Revere of Texas for his 1836 journey from San Patricio to Goliad to Victoria, warning residents of the approaching Mexican army. He was twice elected alcalde of Victoria, Texas. He married into the powerful De León family and, with his wife Agustina, became the father of three daughters. Benavides fought against the dictatorship of Antonio López de Santa Anna but did not feel Texas should be separated from Mexico.

He led a unit of Tejano fighters at the Battle of Goliad, and then he proceeded with his company to San Antonio, where they fought against Martín Perfecto de Cos in the Siege of Bexar. On February 11, 1836, Benavides warned James Bowie inside the Alamo that Santa Anna was approaching. Benavides escaped the Battle of Agua Dulce and was able to warn James Fannin headquartered in Goliad of the enemy army's approach, as he had warned all towns between Agua Dulce and Goliad. When the Texas Declaration of Independence was signed on March 2, 1836, James Fannin discharged Benavides from the army and sent him home. On his route back to Victoria, Benavides spread the alarm about the march of the Mexican army. In 1836, Benavides and his family were among the Mexicans evacuated out of Victoria by Brigadier General Thomas Jefferson Rusk. His family was exiled to Louisiana, where he died of an unknown cause the following year. Texas Historical Marker number 6563 was placed in 1936 at the SW Corner of S. Main and Juan Linn in Victoria, marking the site of the Benavides Round Top house.

== Early life ==
Plácido Benavides was born in 1810, in Reynosa, Tamaulipas, Mexico. Details of his youth are unknown, except that he was taken under the wing of his godfather Captain Henrique Villareal.

In 1828, Benavides moved to Victoria, Texas with his brothers Ysidro, Nicolás, and Eugenio. He became secretary to Fernando De León, the eldest son of the influential De León family in Victoria County. Benavides was put in the position of overseeing land titles and general business transactions there. He married into the De Leon family in 1831. The Mexican government authorized Benavides to continue recruiting colonists to De Leon's Colony after the 1833 death of empresario Martín De León.

In 1832 and 1834, Benavides was elected second alcalde of Victoria. Martín De León had held the position as the first alcalde, and Silvestre De León served as the third alcalde. Benavides built a house fortress with first-floor gun slits and reinforced door, that became known alternately as "Plácido's Round House" and the "Round Top House". Benavides and his brother-in-law Silvestre De León, led several attacks against the Tonkawa and Karankawa Indian tribes. After the death of Benavides, many lives were saved in 1840 by hiding in the roundhouse during a raid by 600 Comanches. Recorded Texas Historic Landmark number 6563 placed in 1936 at the SW Corner of S. Main and Juan Linn in Victoria, marks the site of the Benavides Round Top house.

== At war with Santa Anna ==
When Antonio López de Santa Anna became President of Mexico on April 1, 1833, he revoked the 1824 Constitution of Mexico. He replaced its Federalist form of government with a Centralist regime to further his military dictatorship. He appointed his brother-in-law Martín Perfecto de Cos as commandant-general northeast of Saltillo. Some in the De Leon extended family felt loyal to the Federalist government of the constitution.

=== José María Jesús Carbajal ===
On April 28, 1835, federal legislation in Mexico invalidated the Four Hundred League Law passed by the Coahuila y Texas legislature. Benavides' brother-in-law José María Jesús Carbajal was an elected representative from Bexar to that legislature. General Martín Perfecto de Cos sent troops to shut down the legislature and ordered the arrest of all who voted for the Four Hundred League Law. Colonel Domingo Ugartechea, as principal commandant of Coahuila y Texas, ordered Cabajal arrested, but soldiers searching for him in Victoria were unsuccessful in their attempts at doing so. Alcalde Benavides had refused to surrender Carbajal and ordered his local militia to block the soldiers from entry into Victoria.

=== La Bahia ===
After Gonzales, Texas repelled the Mexican attempted seizure of their cannon on October 2, 1835, Benavides teamed up with John Joseph Linn to capture General Cos. In Victoria, they joined with George M. Collinsworth and Benjamin Milam who were training men for the same purpose. During the Battle of Goliad, Benavides was put in charge of thirty Tejano volunteers who were part of the October 1835 storming of Presidio La Bahía. Goliad was captured by Collinsworth and Milam on October 9, 1835.

=== James Bowie ===
Following the capture of Goliad, Benavides and his men were ordered to join Stephen F. Austin in the two-month Siege of Béxar campaign to drive out General Cos. As part of the campaign, Benavides and his men joined with the James Bowie group in October 1835. In the process of searching for enemy horses, Benavides suggested to Bowie that they torture a simple Mexican herder into admitting he was hiding horses for the Mexican soldiers. The particular torture method used by Benavides and Bowie was to hang the herder by the neck until he almost choked to death, then let him down and threaten him with guns. After executing this method of torture three successive times on the man, the herder confessed and surrendered his herd to Bowie.

=== Matamoros jail break ===
José María Jesús Carbajal, his brother-in-law Fernando De León, and Peter Kerr, responded to an arms plea from Stephen F. Austin and began to run horses and mules to New Orleans in a trade for munitions. The trio was captured by Mexicans and taken prisoner. Kerr was set free, and Fernando De León bribed his way out. Carbajal was transferred to Matamoros, Tamaulipas, with an intended transfer for imprisonment at San Juan de Ulloa. In February 1836, Plácido Benavides was serving at San Patricio under Major Robert C. Morris. When word arrived of Carbajal's imprisonment, Benavides took a small group of men to break Carbajal out of incarceration. He bribed the guards at Matamoros. Although Mexicans gave pursuit, the escape back to Victoria was a success.

=== Goliad ===
The alcalde of Matamoros had leaked to Benavides that Antonio López de Santa Anna planned to draw the Texas forces below the Rio Grande. Benavides reported the information to Major Morris, who passed it along to James Fannin. Upon receipt of the information, Fannin decided against his planned invasion of Matamoros and instead moved his men to Goliad.

=== Alamo ===
Inside the Alamo Mission in San Antonio, at 1 a.m. on February 11, 1836, messenger Blas María Herrera delivered to James Bowie a letter from Benavides, that stated Santa Anna was moving towards San Antonio with a large deployment of troops.

=== Texas Paul Revere ===
On February 27, 1836, while Benavides and James Grant were out with a detachment hunting wild mustangs, General José de Urrea captured San Patricio. On March 2, 1836, Benavides and Grant stumbled into a trap set by Urrera at Agua Dulce Creek, south of San Patricio. Benavides tried rejoining the men, but Grant ordered him to save himself and warn Fannin of Urrea's approach. Upon reaching Fannin with the warning and learning that the Texas Declaration of Independence had just been signed at Washington-on-the-Brazos, Benavides informed Fannin that he did not wish to help Texas to be torn from Mexico. Fannin discharged Benavides from the army and sent him home to Victoria. From San Patricio to his final destination of Victoria, Benavides warned every person and town along the way of Urrea's approach. Benavides became known as the Paul Revere of Texas.

=== Isaac D. Hamilton ===
On March 27, 1836, following the Battle of Coleto, Mexican soldiers under General José de Urrea gunned down 342 unarmed Texans. Isaac D. Hamilton, who had served with Benavides at Goliad, escaped and found refuge on a Benavides-owned ranch. Upon discovering the wounded Hamilton, Benavides attempted to take Hamilton to safety. Encountering a Mexican unit, Benavides saved himself by claiming Hamilton was his prisoner. Hamilton was tortured and taken to Victoria to face a firing squad. He was rescued by "The Angel of Goliad", Francita Alavez. With the help of Alavez, Hamilton escaped back to his hometown of Courtland, Alabama. Hamilton returned to Texas, and in 1858 the Texas legislature awarded him a bounty certificate for league of land, as part of the state's bounty grants for participants in the battle of the Alamo, the siege of Bexar, the Goliad campaigns. Hamilton died in 1859 before he was able to take possession of the land.

== Exile to Louisiana ==
During the Texas War of Independence, many Mexicans were opposed to Santa Anna's regime but felt loyal to Mexico and its 1824 constitution. Brigadier General Thomas Jefferson Rusk ordered the evacuation of Mexican families "...who were likely to afford information to the enemy." The Carbajal, Benavides, and De Leon families evacuated to New Orleans, leaving behind their wealth and everything they owned.

== Personal life and death ==
In 1831 Benavides married Agustina De León, daughter of empresario Martín De León and his wife Patricia de la Garza De León. The couple had three daughters, Pilar, Librada and Matiana.

Benavides died in Opelousas, Louisiana in 1837, cause unknown.

== Legacy ==
The following are Anglicized spellings named after Plácido Benavides:

- Placedo Creek
- Placedo, Texas

== Tejanos who served under Juan Seguín ==
Tejano volunteers under Juan Seguín

Tejano volunteers under the command of Juan Seguín for all or part of their service in the Texas Revolution and the Republic of Texas. Note that Seguin's men at the Alamo were scouts/couriers going in and out, between San Antonio and nearby Gonzales, the rallying point for volunteers.

Siege of Béxar

- Juan Abamillo
- José Alamedo
- José María Arocha
- Juan José Arocha
- Plácido Benavides
- Juan Antonio Badillo
- Manuel Bueno
- Clemente Bustillos
- Mateo Casillas
- Pablo Casillas
- Luis Castañon
- Agapito Cervantes
- Carlos Chacón
- Miguel Cilba
- Ciriaco Contes
- Julian Contes
- Antonio Cruz y Arocha
- Antonio Curvier (aka Curbier)
- Domingo Díaz
- Francisco Díaz
- Julian Díaz
- José Gregorio Esparza
- Ignacio Espinoza
- Manuel N. Flores
- Salvador Flores
- Antonio Fuentes
- Manuel Gallardo
- Pedro Gaona
- Casimiro García
- Clemente García
- Guadalupe García
- Jesus García
- Simon García
- Alexandro de la Garza
- José María de la Garza
- Marcelino de la Garza
- Paulino de la Garza
- Francisco Gómez
- Jesús Gómez
- Gabriel Gonzalez
- Brigido Guerrero
- Antonio Hernández
- Eduardo Hernández
- Gregorio Hernández
- Blas María Herrera
- Pedro Herrera
- Toribio Herrera
- Damacio Jiménez
- José Domingo Losoya
- Toribio Losoya
- Juan Maldonado
- José María Mancha
- Pablo Mansolo
- Francisco Miranda
- Andrés Nava
- Nepomuceno Navarro
- Juan José Palacios
- Eduardo Ramirez
- Vicente Ramos
- Ambrosio Rodríguez
- Ramón Rubio
- Antonio Ruiz
- Esmerigeldo Ruiz
- Francisco Salinas
- Miguel (Margil) Salinas
- Pablo Salinas
- Agapito Tejado
- Francisco Valdéz
- Esteban Villarreal
- José Zúñiga

Battle of the Alamo

- Juan Abamillo
- Simón Arreola
- Juan Antonio Badillo
- José María Arocha
- Juan María Cabrera
- Cesario Carmona
- Antonio Cruz y Arocha
- José Gregorio Esparza
- Antonio Fuentes
- Alexandro de la Garza
- Brigido Guerrero
- Damacio Jiménez (aka Ximenes)
- Jose Maria Jimenez
- Toribio Losoya
- Andrés Nava
- Jose Sebastian Pacheco (aka Luciano Granado)
- Marcos Veramendi

Battle of San Jacinto

- José María Arocha
- Manuel Arocha (aka Manuel de Arocha)
- Simón Arreola
- Andre Bárcinas
- Manuel Bueno
- Juan María Cabrera
- Cesario Carmona
- Gabriel Casillas
- Cayetano Castillo
- Antonio Cruz y Arocha
- Francisco Cuellar
- Antonio Curvier (aka Curbier)
- Fernando Curvier (aka Curbier)
- Matias Curvier (aka Curbier)
- Lucio Enriquez (aka Enriques)
- Manuel N. Flores
- Martin Flores
- Nepomuceno Flores
- Pedro Flores
- Salvador Flores
- Pedro Herrera
- Jose Maria Jimenez
- Juan Jimenez
- Jose Polinio Lavjina
- Narcisco Leal
- Juan Lopez
- Pedro Lopez
- Martin Maldonado
- Tomás Maldonado
- José María Mancha
- Juan Martinez
- Tomas Martinez
- Miguel Mata
- José Antonio Menchaca
- Jose Molina
- Manuel Montalvo
- Crecensio Montez
- Hipolito Montoya
- Antonio Olivas
- Nepomuceno Navarro
- Jacinto Peña
- Damacio de los Reyes
- Eduardo Ramirez
- Ambrosio Rodríguez
- Jose Antonio Rodríguez
- Pablo Salinas
- Manuel Antonio Santiago Tarin
- Antonio Treviño
- Esteban Uran
- Andres Varcinas
- Juan Zambrano
- Vicente Zepeda

Republic of Texas service post-San Jacinto

- Eusebio Almaguez
- Miguel Arcieniega Jr.
- Andre Bárcinas
- Antonio Benites
- Anselmo Bergara
- Manuel Bueno
- Pedro Camarillo
- Mariano Carbajal
- Ignacio Castillo
- Nemecio de la Cerda
- Agapito Cervantes
- Augustin Chaves
- Antonio Conix
- Simón Contreras
- Trinidad Coy
- Antonio Cruz y Arocha
- Antonio Curvier (aka Curbier)
- Nicholas Delgado
- Polonio Díaz
- Ignacio Espinoza
- Antonio Estrada
- Manuel Estrada
- Eusibio Farias
- Manuel N. Flores
- Martin Flores
- Nepomuceno Flores
- Salvador Flores
- Agapio Gaitan
- Damacio Galban
- Leandro Garza
- Vicente Garza
- Manuel Hernández
- Felipe Jaimes
- José María Landera
- Xavier Lazo
- Cayetano Lerma
- Manuel Lopez
- Juan Maldonado
- Gabriel Martinez
- Manuel Martinez
- Miguel Mata
- Manuel Montalvo
- Manuel Montate
- Francisco Morales
- Pedro Flores Morales
- José Antonio Navarro
- José Luciano Navarro
- Jacinto Peña
- James Quina
- Eduardo Ramirez
- José María Rios
- Cayetano Rivas
- Ambrosio Rodríguez
- Francisco Rodríguez
- Juan Rodríguez
- Mariano Romano
- Cristobal Rubio
- Antonio Ruiz
- Franco Ruiz
- Antonio Sambraño
- Antonio Sanches
- Guadalupe de los Santos
- Nicolas de los Santos
- Juan Sombraña
- Gregorio Sota
- Ramon Trevino
- José María Valdéz
- Juan Vallanceon
- Marcos Veramendi
- Antonio Hernandez Zavala
- Jesus Zavala

Sources:

- "San Jacinto Museum of History - The Kemp Sketches". San Jacinto Museum of History.
- MacDonald, L. Lloyd (2009). Tejanos in the 1835 Texas Revolution. Pelican Publishing. pp. 260–262. ISBN 978-1589806382.
- Teja, Jesus F. De la; Matovina, Timothy; Poché, Justin (2013). Recollections of a Tejano Life: Antonio Menchaca in Texas History. University of Texas Press. p. 90. ISBN 978-0292748651.
- Texas State Archives, Republic of Texas Claims
- Texas A & M professor Wallace L. McKeehan, also on the school's Board of Regents website: Hispanic Texian Patriots in the Struggle for Independence
- Handbook of Texas
