= Antonio Menchaca =

Texas revolutionary

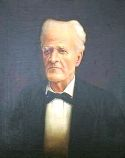
- Portrait of Antonio Menchaca

107th Mayor of San Antonio
- In office 1838–1839
- Preceded by: William H. Daingerfield
- Succeeded by: Samuel Maverick

Personal details
- Born: 1797 San Antonio de Béxar, New Spain
- Died: November 1, 1879 (aged 81–82) San Antonio, Texas
- Profession: Soldier and politician

(José) Antonio Menchaca (1800-1 November 1879) was a Tejano soldier and politician who fought in the Texas Revolution and was recognized by a Joint Resolution of the Republic of Texas on December 22, 1838. Following the war, Menchaca served on the city council of San Antonio, Texas and at one time as Mayor Pro Tem. He later commanded militia troops and helped defend the town from a Mexican invasion by General Adrian Woll in 1842.

== Personal life ==
Menchaca was born in Spanish Texas in January 1800 in the municipality of San Antonio de Béxar (present-day San Antonio, Texas). He was baptized as a Roman Catholic on January 17, 1800. His parents, Juan Mariano Menchaca and Maria Luz Guerra, were of Spanish descent. His great-great grandfather, Antonio Guerra, was one of the founders of Béxar, who settled in Texas in 1718. Menchaca was the sixth of ten children. He was well-educated and could speak and write both Spanish and English fluently. In 1824 he married Teresa Ramon. They had four children together: Joaquina, Maria de Jesus, Antonia Manuela and Maria Antonia. Joaquina married John Glanton, a veteran of the Texas Revolution. Antonia Manuela married a Frenchman, Jean Baptiste Ducuron LaCoste. Maria Antonia married Maximilian Neuendorff. Menchaca's father died between 1820 and 1830, and his mother died in the 1840s.

== Texas Revolution ==
After the Texas Revolution began in October 1835, Antonio Menchaca joined the Texian Army, enrolling in a cavalry company under Captain Juan Seguin. After the Mexican army was expelled from Texas in December 1835, he was stationed with other Texan forces at the Alamo Mission in Béxar. In February 1836, word came that Mexican President Antonio Lopez de Santa Anna was leading an army into Texas to reclaim the territory. Alamo co-commander James Bowie held a council of war with his officers, including Menchaca, to determine what steps to take next. Both Bowie and Seguin urged Menchaca to take a furlough and bring his family to safety; they were worried that Santa Anna would treat his family as traitors. Menchaca moved his family out of the town, to Seguin's isolated ranch.

On February 23, Santa Anna led a large army into Béxar and commenced a siege of the Alamo. Alamo co-commander William Barret Travis immediately began sending letters throughout the region, begging for reinforcements for his small troop. Men began gathering in Gonzales, a town about 70 miles (110 km) east of Béxar.

After six days of hiding at Seguin's ranch, Menchaca moved his family to Gonzales. Immediately after his arrival on March 6, Menchaca went to the home of Green DeWitt, the empresario who had founded Gonzales. There he found Edward Burleson, who had led the Texan army in December 1835 and was now serving as a private in a volunteer company wanting to reinforce the Alamo. Assured that DeWitt was aware of the events in Béxar, Menchaca announced his intention to take his family further east, across the Guadalupe River. Burleson insisted that Menchaca stay, as all able-bodied men were needed to fight in the Texan army.

The following day, Seguin rode into Gonzales with 25 additional recruits. The 14 Tejano volunteers already in Gonzales, including Menchaca, joined Seguin's new company. The men voted on their officers, choosing Salvador Flores as their first lieutenant and Menchaca as second lieutenant. Among his duties, Menchaca served as a translator for the company members who could not speak English including Juan Seguin.

Sam Houston arrived in Gonzales about 4 p.m. on March 11. He announced that the Convention of 1836 had declared Texas an independent nation, and read the men the Texas Declaration of Independence. The new interim government had placed Houston in charge of the recruits gathered in Gonzales. That evening, two men arrived from Béxar with news that the Mexican army had retaken the Alamo, and the Texian defenders were dead; Houston promptly arrested the men as spies.

The following day, Houston organized the army. All of the companies gathered, including Seguin's, were placed into the First Regiment of Infantry, with Edward Burleson in charge. Houston sent scouts to determine what had actually happened in Béxar. They returned on March 13 with Susanna Dickinson, who had been inside the Alamo during the battle. Dickinson warned that more than 2,000 Mexican troops were on their way to Gonzales. Local citizens panicked; Houston ordered an immediate retreat, promising that his new army would protect the citizens as they fled. Over the next month, the Texian army marched over 200 miles (320 km), retreating east and north.

On April 18, the Texian army reached the ashes of Harrisburg, arriving shortly after Mexican troops under Santa Anna had left. Later that day, a scouting party led by Deaf Smith and Henry Karnes captured three Mexican horsemen. One of the captured men was a courier, carrying mail for Santa Anna. Menchaca and Lorenzo de Zavala Jr. were asked to translate the letters for Houston. The correspondence revealed the locations and strengths of the various Mexican forces in Texas, their strategies for the next few days, and the fact that the Mexican leaders had no idea of the location and size of the Texian army.

With this intelligence, Houston could now make a plan. He chose to act quickly and ordered his men to cross Buffalo Bayou and move to Lynchburg. Houston ordered that the sick remain behind with the baggage wagons in Harrisburg. Colonel Sidney Sherman brought Menchaca orders from Houston that Seguin's company should remain behind and guard the sick. Menchaca found Seguin, and together the men confronted Houston. Menchaca spoke loudly, telling Houston that, "'he could not deprive me of my commission. ... I did not enlist to guard horses and would not do such duty.'" Houston was concerned that the Anglos in his army would not differentiate between the Mexican men in Santa Anna's army and those in Seguin's company. Seguin reminded him that his men had also died at the Alamo, and that they had more reasons than anyone else there to hate the centralists. Houston rescinded his orders but, as a compromise, insisted that all of the men in Seguin's company place a piece of cardboard in their hatbands as a sign that they were part of the Texian army.

The Texian army made camp at Lynchburg, on the banks of Buffalo Bayou, on the morning of April 20. A few hours later, Santa Anna led his portion of the Mexican army to a campsite less than 1 mile (1.6 km) away. There were two small skirmishes that day as each army tested the strength of the other. Santa Anna received approximately 400 reinforcements at 8 a.m. the following morning, bringing his army to 1,250 men. Texian troops were convinced that a Mexican attack was imminent. Santa Anna's men had spent much of the night preparing for a Texian attack, building makeshift breastworks around their exposed camp. The newly arrived troops were no better rested - they had marched continuously for 24 hours with no sleep or food. As the morning faded away with no sign that the Texians were preparing an attack, Santa Anna relaxed his guard. His troops, including those who had been standing guard, were given permission to rest.

At 3:30 p.m., the Texian army lined up. Seguin's men, as part of Burleson's First Regiment, were in the center of the line. At 4 p.m., the Texian army advanced, commencing the Battle of San Jacinto. They crept forward in silence, hidden by the tall grass. Houston ordered them to charge when they were about 200 yards (180 m) from the Mexican camp. Mexican troops were taken completely by surprise. After firing the first volley, the Texian line fell apart. Many did not bother to reload, instead jumping over the breastworks and swinging their rifles as clubs. Mexican officers yelled orders, but were unable to get control of their men.

The battle lasted 18 minutes. Unable or unwilling to mount any sort of unified resistance, Mexican soldiers and officers fled for their lives. Texian commanders were unable to gain control of their troops, and the slaughter continued until dusk. Some sources claim that a Mexican officer approached Menchaca. The two had known each other in Béxar. The officer begged Menchaca to intercede for him, as a "brother Mexican". Menchaca yelled back at him "No, damn you, I'm no Mexican - I'm an American!" and shouted for Anglos nearby to shoot him.

Many Mexican soldiers fled towards Peggy Lake and attempted to swim to safety. Texan soldiers positioned themselves on the banks and shot those swimming. As the Texans tired, the killing slowed. The surviving Mexican troops were taken prisoner. Menchaca was put in charge of many of the prisoners taken near the lake. The prisoners were marched back to their original campsite. Battlefield debris was piled around the circle, and the three cannons were loaded and pointed at the prisoners to ensure their docility.

== Later years ==
After the Mexican army retreated from Texas, Menchaca accompanied Seguin and several other Tejanos to Nacogdoches to retrieve their families and return to Béxar. On their journey home, most of the other adults in the convoy became ill, and Menchaca took sole responsibility for nursing the sick. The Congress of the Republic of Texas passed a joint resolution in 1838 honoring his service in the Revolution and granting him a home in San Antonio.

Menchaca was given a military command in July 1842, leading a company to protect the frontier south of Béxar from Indian attacks. His company helped to defend Béxar in September 1842, when Mexican General Adrian Woll invaded the town. Menchaca was wounded when hit by a stone that had been struck by a cannonball. He was taken prisoner by Mexican troops and released within days after his family swore not to take up arms against Mexico again. He did not enlist during the Mexican–American War.

By 1850, he was established as a merchant. He also served as alderman and then as mayor pro tem from July 1838 through January 1839.

Menchaca became a spokesperson for Tejanos who felt they had been treated unjustly by the Republic, and later State, of Texas after the war ended. He frequently spoke up for Tejano veterans who thought they had been denied proper compensation for their service and was often a witness in legal proceedings. In the late 1870s he dictated his autobiography to an unknown person. The first half of his memoirs, covering his life through the Battle of San Jacinto, was first published in 1907 by James Pearson Newcomb.

Menchaca died on November 1, 1879, and was interred in San Fernando Cemetery in San Antonio.

Menchaca was a Freemason. Manchaca Springs was named for him, and the village of Manchaca also. Both are misspelled. In 2018 the City of Austin changed the spelling of Manchaca Road to Menchaca Road to correct the erroneous spelling of his name. The elementary school in Manchaca, Texas is spelled correctly ---Menchaca Elementary.

== Tejanos who served under Juan Seguín ==
Tejano volunteers under Juan Seguín

Tejano volunteers under the command of Juan Seguín for all or part of their service in the Texas Revolution and the Republic of Texas. Note that Seguin's men at the Alamo were scouts/couriers going in and out, between San Antonio and nearby Gonzales, the rallying point for volunteers.

Siege of Béxar

- Juan Abamillo
- José Alamedo
- José María Arocha
- Juan José Arocha
- Plácido Benavides
- Juan Antonio Badillo
- Manuel Bueno
- Clemente Bustillos
- Mateo Casillas
- Pablo Casillas
- Luis Castañon
- Agapito Cervantes
- Carlos Chacón
- Miguel Cilba
- Ciriaco Contes
- Julian Contes
- Antonio Cruz y Arocha
- Antonio Curvier (aka Curbier)
- Domingo Díaz
- Francisco Díaz
- Julian Díaz
- José Gregorio Esparza
- Ignacio Espinoza
- Manuel N. Flores
- Salvador Flores
- Antonio Fuentes
- Manuel Gallardo
- Pedro Gaona
- Casimiro García
- Clemente García
- Guadalupe García
- Jesus García
- Simon García
- Alexandro de la Garza
- José María de la Garza
- Marcelino de la Garza
- Paulino de la Garza
- Francisco Gómez
- Jesús Gómez
- Gabriel Gonzalez
- Brigido Guerrero
- Antonio Hernández
- Eduardo Hernández
- Gregorio Hernández
- Blas María Herrera
- Pedro Herrera
- Toribio Herrera
- Damacio Jiménez
- José Domingo Losoya
- Toribio Losoya
- Juan Maldonado
- José María Mancha
- Pablo Mansolo
- Francisco Miranda
- Andrés Nava
- Nepomuceno Navarro
- Juan José Palacios
- Eduardo Ramirez
- Vicente Ramos
- Ambrosio Rodríguez
- Ramón Rubio
- Antonio Ruiz
- Esmerigeldo Ruiz
- Francisco Salinas
- Miguel (Margil) Salinas
- Pablo Salinas
- Agapito Tejado
- Francisco Valdéz
- Esteban Villarreal
- José Zúñiga

Battle of the Alamo

- Juan Abamillo
- Simón Arreola
- Juan Antonio Badillo
- José María Arocha
- Juan María Cabrera
- Cesario Carmona
- Antonio Cruz y Arocha
- José Gregorio Esparza
- Antonio Fuentes
- Alexandro de la Garza
- Brigido Guerrero
- Damacio Jiménez (aka Ximenes)
- Jose Maria Jimenez
- Toribio Losoya
- Andrés Nava
- Jose Sebastian Pacheco (aka Luciano Granado)
- Marcos Veramendi

Battle of San Jacinto

- José María Arocha
- Manuel Arocha (aka Manuel de Arocha)
- Simón Arreola
- Andre Bárcinas
- Manuel Bueno
- Juan María Cabrera
- Cesario Carmona
- Gabriel Casillas
- Cayetano Castillo
- Antonio Cruz y Arocha
- Francisco Cuellar
- Antonio Curvier (aka Curbier)
- Fernando Curvier (aka Curbier)
- Matias Curvier (aka Curbier)
- Lucio Enriquez (aka Enriques)
- Manuel N. Flores
- Martin Flores
- Nepomuceno Flores
- Pedro Flores
- Salvador Flores
- Pedro Herrera
- Jose Maria Jimenez
- Juan Jimenez
- Jose Polinio Lavjina
- Narcisco Leal
- Juan Lopez
- Pedro Lopez
- Martin Maldonado
- Tomás Maldonado
- José María Mancha
- Juan Martinez
- Tomas Martinez
- Miguel Mata
- José Antonio Menchaca
- Jose Molina
- Manuel Montalvo
- Crecensio Montez
- Hipolito Montoya
- Antonio Olivas
- Nepomuceno Navarro
- Jacinto Peña
- Damacio de los Reyes
- Eduardo Ramirez
- Ambrosio Rodríguez
- Jose Antonio Rodríguez
- Pablo Salinas
- Manuel Antonio Santiago Tarin
- Antonio Treviño
- Esteban Uran
- Andres Varcinas
- Juan Zambrano
- Vicente Zepeda

Republic of Texas service post-San Jacinto

- Eusebio Almaguez
- Miguel Arcieniega Jr.
- Andre Bárcinas
- Antonio Benites
- Anselmo Bergara
- Manuel Bueno
- Pedro Camarillo
- Mariano Carbajal
- Ignacio Castillo
- Nemecio de la Cerda
- Agapito Cervantes
- Augustin Chaves
- Antonio Conix
- Simón Contreras
- Trinidad Coy
- Antonio Cruz y Arocha
- Antonio Curvier (aka Curbier)
- Nicholas Delgado
- Polonio Díaz
- Ignacio Espinoza
- Antonio Estrada
- Manuel Estrada
- Eusibio Farias
- Manuel N. Flores
- Martin Flores
- Nepomuceno Flores
- Salvador Flores
- Agapio Gaitan
- Damacio Galban
- Leandro Garza
- Vicente Garza
- Manuel Hernández
- Felipe Jaimes
- José María Landera
- Xavier Lazo
- Cayetano Lerma
- Manuel Lopez
- Juan Maldonado
- Gabriel Martinez
- Manuel Martinez
- Miguel Mata
- Manuel Montalvo
- Manuel Montate
- Francisco Morales
- Pedro Flores Morales
- José Antonio Navarro
- José Luciano Navarro
- Jacinto Peña
- James Quina
- Eduardo Ramirez
- José María Rios
- Cayetano Rivas
- Ambrosio Rodríguez
- Francisco Rodríguez
- Juan Rodríguez
- Mariano Romano
- Cristobal Rubio
- Antonio Ruiz
- Franco Ruiz
- Antonio Sambraño
- Antonio Sanches
- Guadalupe de los Santos
- Nicolas de los Santos
- Juan Sombraña
- Gregorio Sota
- Ramon Trevino
- José María Valdéz
- Juan Vallanceon
- Marcos Veramendi
- Antonio Hernandez Zavala
- Jesus Zavala

Sources:

- "San Jacinto Museum of History - The Kemp Sketches". San Jacinto Museum of History.
- MacDonald, L. Lloyd (2009). Tejanos in the 1835 Texas Revolution. Pelican Publishing. pp. 260–262. ISBN 978-1589806382.
- Teja, Jesus F. De la; Matovina, Timothy; Poché, Justin (2013). Recollections of a Tejano Life: Antonio Menchaca in Texas History. University of Texas Press. p. 90. ISBN 978-0292748651.
- Texas State Archives, Republic of Texas Claims
- Texas A & M professor Wallace L. McKeehan, also on the school's Board of Regents website: Hispanic Texian Patriots in the Struggle for Independence
- Handbook of Texas

== Sources ==
- Coalson, George O., "Menchaca, Jose Antonio [1800-79]", Handbook of Texas, Texas State Historical Association
- Hardin, Stephen L. (1994), Texian Iliad – A Military History of the Texas Revolution, Austin, TX: University of Texas Press, ISBN 0-292-73086-1, OCLC 29704011
- Menchaca, Antonio (2013), Matovina, Timothy; de la Teja, Jesus F. (eds.), Recollections of a Tejano Life: Antonio Menchaca in Texas History, University of Texas Press, ISBN 978-0292748651
- Moore, Stephen L. (2004), Eighteen minutes: the battle of San Jacinto and the Texas independence campaign, Republic of Texas Press, ISBN 1-58907-009-7
