= Placedo Creek =

Coordinates: 28.7016°N 96.6605°W

- Map

Location
- Country: United States
- State: Texas

Physical characteristics
- Mouth: Lavaca Bay
- Length: 27 m (89 ft)

Placedo Creek is a 27-mile (43 km) stream in Victoria County and Calhoun County, Texas, in the United States. It flows to Lavaca Bay.

The stream was named after Plácido Benavides, a pioneer settler.

== See also ==
- List of rivers of Texas
