= Paul Revere of Texas =

Paul Revere of Texas is a sobriquet given to people during the Texas Revolution for alerting settlers about Mexican troop movements. It is a reference to Paul Revere because of the similar circumstances in 1775 when Revere and William Dawes responded to information from Joseph Warren about movement of British forces. The duo made rides alerting Samuel Adams, John Hancock and colonial militia troops.

People who were referred to as Paul Revere of Texas include:

- Plácido Benavides (1810–1837), an early Mexican-born settler. Benavides escaped during the March 2, 1836 Battle of Agua Dulce, near San Patricio, and rode to Goliad to warn James Fannin of the advancing invading forces of Mexican General José de Urrea. Fannin sent Benavides home to Victoria, while Fannin himself stayed to engage Urrea at the Goliad massacre. Throughout his journey from San Patricio to Goliad to Victoria, Benavides alerted all communities he passed through. Fannin was captured and executed at Goliad.
- Mathew Caldwell (1798–1842), an early settler, military figure and a signer of the Texas Declaration of Independence. Caldwell earned the sobriquet for his ride from Gonzales to Bastrop in 1835 as a call to arms before the Battle of Gonzales.
- John Marie Durst (1797–1851), an early settler and military figure. Attending a session of the Coahuila y Tejas legislature held in Monclova in 1835, Durst became privy to information regarding northward troop movements of the Mexican army under the command of Antonio López de Santa Anna. Durst then mounted his horse and for the next twelve-and-a-half days traveled several hundred miles, warning settlers about the impending military invasion, ending his ride in Nacogdoches, Texas.
- Blas María Herrera (1802–1878), a San Antonio-born soldier under Juan Seguín. Following direct orders from Seguin in February 1836, Herrera stood watch in Laredo on the look out for any Mexican troops. Upon spotting General Santa Anna and a vanguard of Mexican troops crossing the Rio Grande, Hererra rode all night to deliver his report to Seguin in San Antonio. American volunteers chose to remain inside the Alamo, but Herrera's warning allowed civilian families in the area time to evacuate.

== See also ==
- Paul Revere (disambiguation)
