= Geronimo Creek =

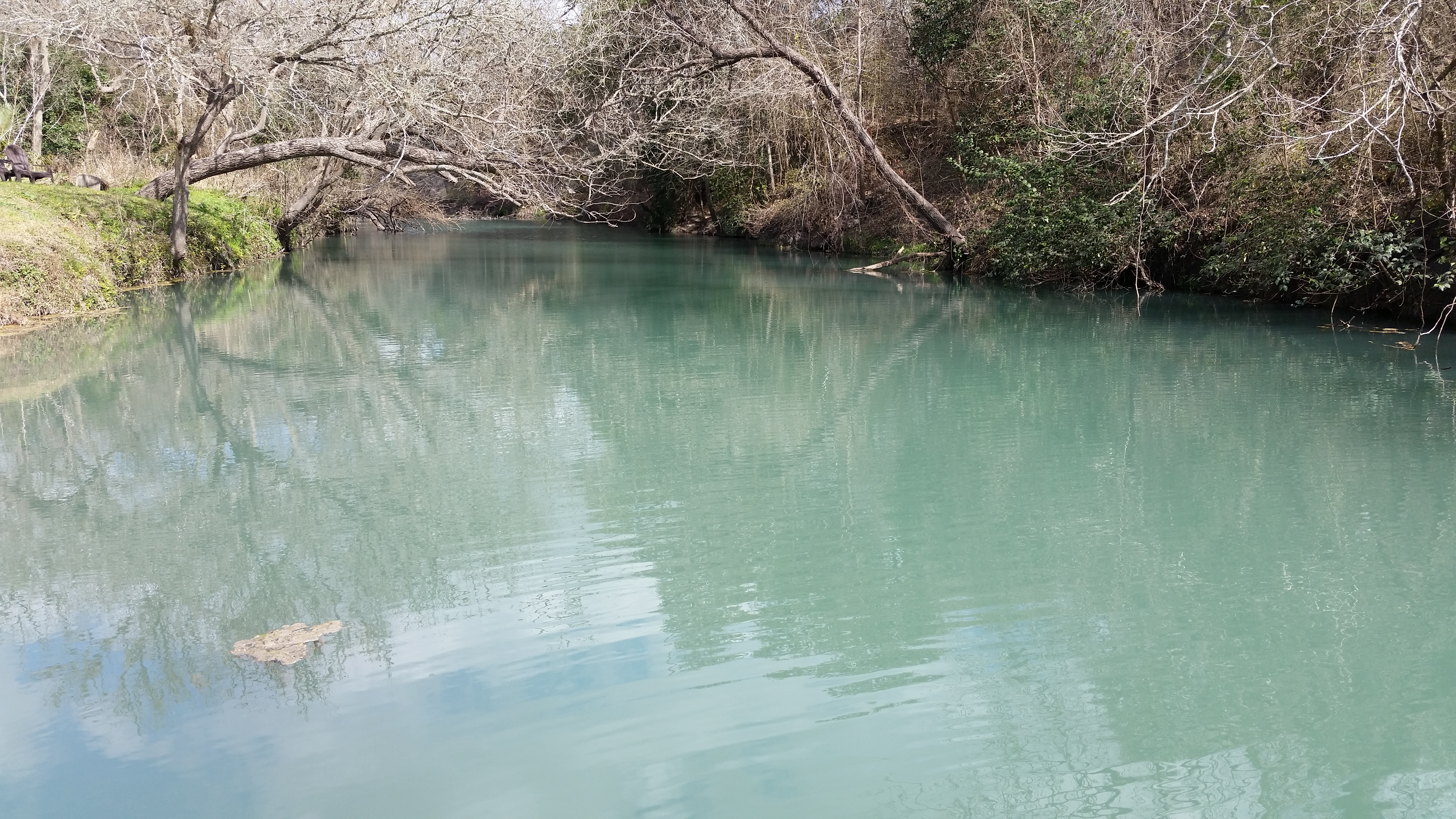

Location
- Country: United States
- State: Texas

Physical characteristics
- Source
  - location: Geronimo, Texas
  - coordinates: 29°40′19″N 97°59′17″W
- Mouth: Guadalupe River
  - location: Seguin, Texas
  - coordinates: 29°32′29″N 97°54′52″W
  - elevation: 129 m (423 ft)

Geronimo Creek is a stream in South Central Texas, U.S., that runs approximately 17 miles, from its source one mile east of Clear Springs, Texas (in the Texas Prairielands), to its confluence with the Guadalupe River in Guadalupe County, Texas, three miles southeast of Seguin.

The creek serves as a tributary of the Guadalupe River and forms its watershed near Seguin, Texas, within the larger Guadalupe River Basin.

== Description ==
The near seventy square-mile Geronimo Creek watershed lies entirely within the larger Guadalupe River Basin. The upper part of its tributary, Alligator Creek, is located in Comal county. Alligator Creek begins on the west side of IH-35 and flows southeast into Guadalupe county. The Geronimo Creek is intermittent at its upper reaches.

== Recreation ==
Today, this watershed offers multiple opportunities for primitive recreation, angling, and hunting.

== Fauna ==
A wide variety of fish and other wildlife are known to occupy the region. The creek passes through steep to gently sloped terrain that is surfaced by clay and sandy loams that support scrub brush, honey mesquite, huisache and natural grasses including "Texas spur".

== See also ==
- List of rivers of Texas
