= Texas Sesquicentennial =

The Texas Sesquicentennial was a celebration of 150 years since Texas won its independence from Mexico. The Texas sesquicentennial happened in 1986. The Texas Sesquicentennial Commission managed celebrations related to the sesquicentennial.

== Background ==
During 1977-1978, the Subcommittee on Tourism Development in Texas and Development of a Sesquicentennial Celebration for 1986 (formed within Texas House of Representatives Committee on Business and Industry) researched the role of tourism in the state and possible recommendations for planning and funding events related to the Sesquicentennial. The Subcommittee submitted a final interim report to the legislature with the first section documenting the charge related to tourism and the second section outlining findings and recommendations for the Sesquicentennial.

The section of the report about the sesquicentennial provided background based on the previous Centennial celebrations, which were overseen by the Texas Centennial Commission and included the Texas Centennial Exposition and exhibitions in the largest cities. It also outlined the information collected by the Subcommittee during six separate public hearings about potential sesquicentennial celebrations that informed the suggestions made by the Subcommittee. There were four specific steps recommended by the report:

1. The legislature should authorize a Texas Sesquicentennial Commission with 15 members and ex-officio members from agencies that would likely be involved in celebration events
2. Appropriations should be made for the Commission and also for agencies planning or marketing events (e.g., The Texas Tourism Development Agency, the Texas Historical Commission, and the Texas Film Commission)
3. Observance should include statewide participation as well as major events in large cities, modeled similarly to the 1936 Centennial
4. Commemorative items should be developed by the Commission to mark the event

In response, the 66th session of the Texas state Legislature created the Texas 1986 Sesquicentennial Commission in 1979 to manage celebrations related to the sesquicentennial. A key responsibility of the Commission was to coordinate locally-organized events and authorize the use of the official logo for sanctioned events, which could be requested by submitting a form. According to Karen Mosman, an information specialist from the Texas Sesquicentennial Commission, the commission organized or approved more than 10,000 events.

== Planning and Celebration ==
A number of local cities started planning for events early. In preparation for the sesquicentennial, Fair Park in Dallas underwent a $20 million renovation.

The Commission unveiled the official mascot of the sesquicentennial, R.T. Texadillo, in May 1985, with "R.T." standing for "Republic of Texas."

Events:

- The Lyndon Baines Johnson Presidential Library had an exhibit for the sesquicentennial.
- A 150-wagon train named the Texas Sesquicentennial Wagon Train traveled 3,000 miles around Texas over 6 months to commemorate the sesquicentennial.
- Many cities incorporated parades, including Abilene, League City (April 19th), and Cleveland.
- The Dallas Genealogical Society co-sponsored a Sesquicentennial Family History and Genealogy exhibit and competition at the 1986 State Fair of Texas.

Publications:

- Texas Highways magazine produced an official publication with feature stories about the history of the state; according to the Commission, the special issue caused circulation rates of the magazine to increase by nearly 60,000 by 1987.
- The Commission published a newsletter titled The Texas National Dispatch to disseminate information about efforts to organize events. Starting in May 1985, the Commission issued a second publication on alternating months titled Stars Across Texas.
- The Texas State Library issued a series of pamphlets, "Celebrating Texas' Sesquicentennial 1836-1986"
- A special eight-part series titled, Lone Star: A Television History of Texas was produced by KEDT-TV and broadcast on PBS

Commemorative items:

- Texas "Sesquicentennial" license plates
- Shot glasses featuring Texas landmarks and other distinctive imagery, e.g.: La Bahia Mission, an oil well, the San Jacinto monument, Senora del Carmen mission, and others
- Ceramic bottles featuring images such as the Alamo

== Criticism ==
Howard LaFranchi, a writer for The Christian Science Monitor, criticized sesquicentennial events for a lack of funding.
