= Toribio Losoya =

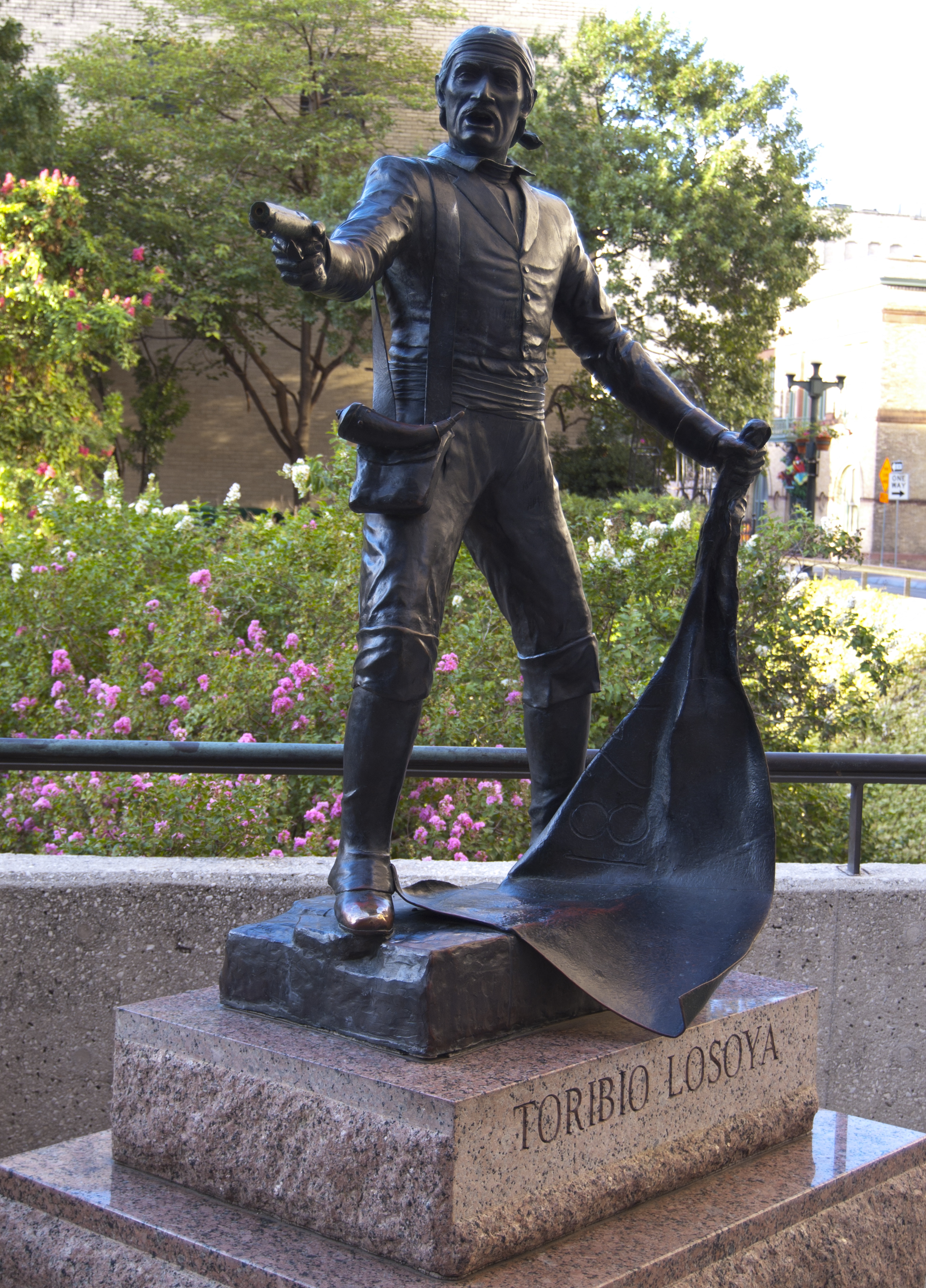
- Statue of Toribio Losoya by William Easley in San Antonio, Texas
- Born: José Toribio Losoya; April 11, 1808; San Antonio de Béjar, Texas, Viceroyalty of New Spain
- Died: March 6, 1836 (aged 27); Alamo Mission, San Antonio, Texas
- Occupation: Soldier

José Toribio Losoya (April 11, 1808 – March 6, 1836) was a former Mexican soldier, a Texian military participant in the Siege of Bexar and Battle of the Alamo defender.

== Early life and family ==
Losoya was born in San Antonio on April 11, 1808, to Ventura Losoya and Concepción de Los Angeles Charlé. Their old stone house was a former Alamo Indian dwelling. His parents, brother Juan, sister Maria and Toribio all lived in the two room building near the southwest corner of the mission compound. Losoya married Concepción Curbier and they had three children.

== Career ==
Toribio Losoya was a private in the Mexican Army, serving at the Alamo with the Second Flying Company of San Carlos de Parras under Lt. Col. José Francisco Ruiz. During 1830, his company had built Fort Tenoxtitlán on the west bank of the Brazos River, 100 miles (161 km) above San Felipe. Losoya and his family were stationed at the fort until September 1832, whereupon he returned to San Antonio. Losoya was among the many Mexican soldiers who didn't like the centralist policies exercised by Antonio López de Santa Anna.

== Texas Revolution ==
In late 1835, he had deserted the Mexican army and joined Juan Seguín's company of Tejanos, participating in the siege of Bexar. While the town was under siege for many months by the Texians, so was their home and many others, as the house to house fighting progressed.

When Santa Anna's troops retook San Antonio and laid siege to the Alamo in 1836, Losoya and family entered the Alamo for safety. Losoya, Esparza, and 14 of Seguín's men would remain behind, as Seguín rode from the Alamo to recruit reinforcements. Losoya's mother and three children remained in the mission during the siege of the Alamo. Losoya was killed in the March 6 battle of the Alamo. His body was discovered by Francisco Ruiz in the chapel and was burnt on the pyres along with the other Alamo defenders.

== Losoya survivors of the Battle of the Alamo ==
His mother, Concepcion Losoya, brother Juan Losoya, and sister, Juana Melton were spared and are listed as official non-combatant survivors of the Battle of the Alamo.

== Commemoration ==
A life-size statue of Losoya, sculpted by William Easley, stands across Losoya Street from the Hyatt Regency Hotel on the Paseo del Alamo in San Antonio. The Adolph Coors Company gifted the sculpture of "an unsung hero of the Alamo" to commemorate the Texas Sesquicentennial celebration.

The Alamo's west wall was excavated in 1979-80 and the Losoya home basework was located and photographed thus showing the layout of the family's two-room residence.

== See also ==
- List of Texan survivors of the Battle of the Alamo
