= Texas Park Road 1836 =

State road in Houston, Texas, United States

PR 1836
- San Jacinto Battleground State Park Road; Juan N. Seguin Boulevard
- PR 1836 highlighted in red

Route information
- Maintained by TxDOT
- Length: 7.234 mi (11.642 km)
- Existed: June 2, 1960–present

Major junctions
- South end: Independence Parkway in Houston
- North end: San Jacinto Battleground State Historic Site

Location
- Country: United States
- State: Texas
- Counties: Harris

Highway system
- Highways in Texas; Interstate; US; State; Former; Toll; Loops; Spurs; FM/RM; Park; Rec
← PR 100	→ PR 1

Park Road 1836 (PR 1836), also known as San Jacinto Battleground State Park Road and Juan N. Seguin Boulevard, is a Park Road in southeast Texas. The route is 7.234 miles (11.642 km) long, and connects San Jacinto Battleground State Historic Site to Independence Parkway (former SH 134) in Houston in southeast Harris County. The designation is given to multiple roads on the park grounds. The road was designated as PR 9 in 1939 before receiving its current designation in 1960.

== Route description ==
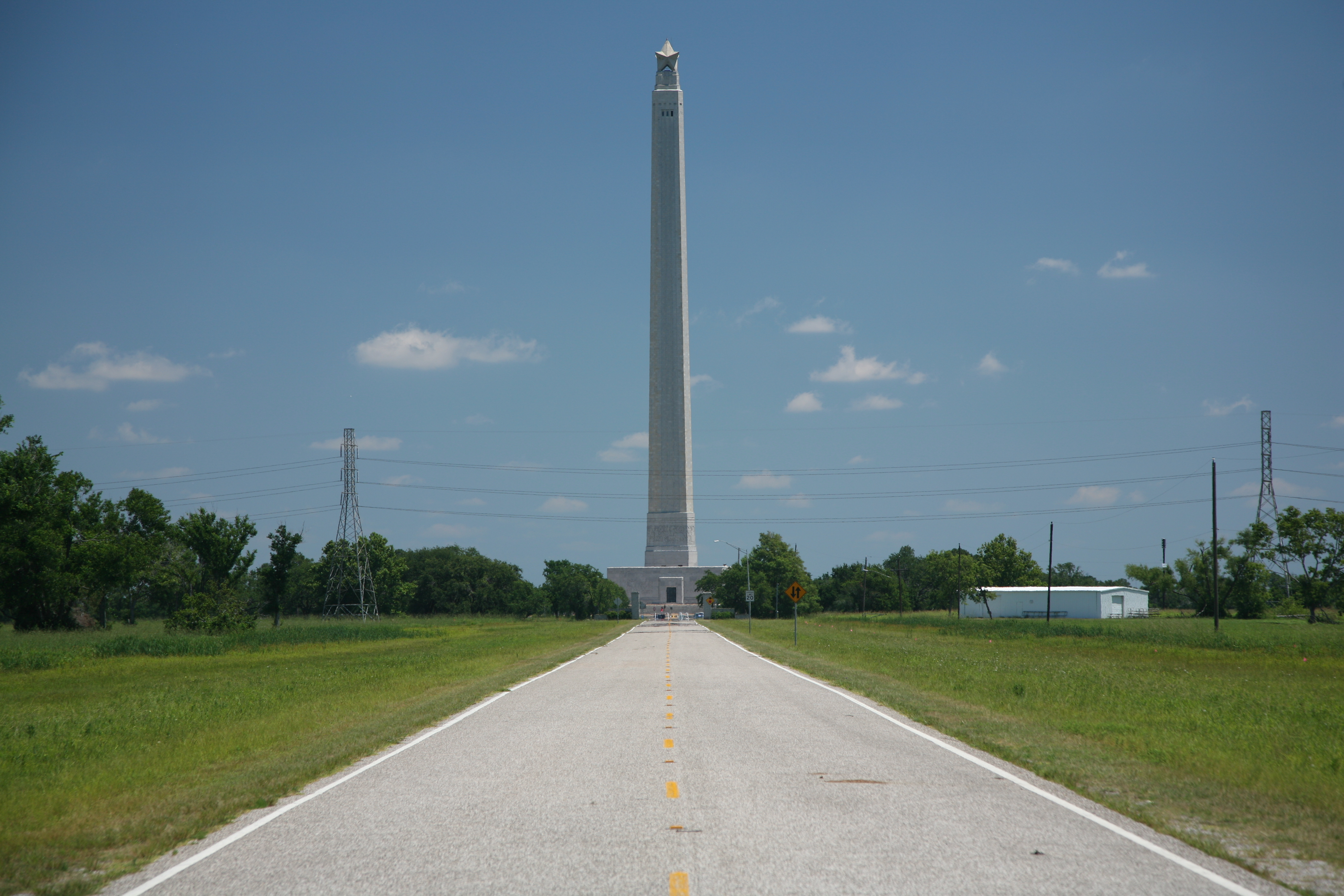
PR 1836 approaching the San Jacinto Monument, June 2009

PR 1836 begins at an intersection with Independence Parkway near several oil refineries in Houston, Harris County. From here, the park road heads northeast along two-lane undivided Juan N. Seguin Boulevard onto the grounds of San Jacinto Battleground State Historic Site, passing through a park gate. The PR 1836 designation extends along all the roads on the park grounds. Marker Drive leads northwest from Juan N. Seguin Boulevard and serves the park headquarters and the site of the USS Texas. Juan N. Seguin Boulevard continues northeast and loops around the San Jacinto Monument as Monument Circle. Another branch of PR 1836 heads southeast from the intersection of Juan N. Seguin Boulevard and Marker Drive and turns north before reaching a dead end adjacent to the Marsh and Wetlands Habitat. Another section of the park road runs from Monument Circle southeast alongside the Marsh and Wetlands Habitat before turning southwest to intersect the easterly branch of PR 1836.

== History ==
The route was first designated on September 26, 1939 as PR 9. PR 9 was transferred to PR 1836 on June 2, 1960 to commemorate the year that Texas won its independence from Mexico. The route has remained on the same roads since 1939. In September 2001, the section of PR 1836 connecting Battleground Road to the park was renamed Juan N. Seguin Boulevard in honor of Juan Seguín, a hero of the Texas Revolution.

== Major junctions ==
The entire road is in Houston, Harris County.

mi	km	Destinations	Notes
0.000	0.000	Independence Parkway	Southern terminus
7.234	11.642	San Jacinto Battleground State Historic Site	PR 1836 splits into multiple branches
1.000 mi = 1.609 km; 1.000 km = 0.621 mi

== See also ==
- List of Park Roads in Texas
