= List of Park Roads in Texas =

Park Roads
- Park Road markers

System information
- Maintained by TxDOT
- Formed: June 22, 1937

Highway names
- Interstates: Interstate X (I-X); Interstate Highway X (IH-X)
- US Highways: U.S. Highway X (US X)
- State: State Highway X (SH X)
- Loops: Loop X
- Spurs: Spur X
- Recreational: Recreational Road X (RE X)
- Farm or Ranch to Market Roads: Farm to Market Road X (FM X); Ranch to Market Road X (RM X)
- Park Roads: Park Road X (PR X)

System links
- Highways in Texas; Interstate; US; State; Former; Toll; Loops; Spurs; FM/RM; Park; Rec

Park Roads represent a subset of public roads designated and maintained by the Texas Department of Transportation (TxDOT). Park Roads are intended to provide access to and connection within Texas state parks. The system of Park Roads was established in 1937 at the request of the state parks board to establish maintenance of eight roads within the state's parks. The network of Park Roads has grown incrementally over the years along with the growth of parks now under the authority of the Texas Parks and Wildlife Department. Park Roads are marked with distinctive signage distinguishing them from other state-maintained highways.

== History ==
On September 22, 1936, the state highway commission initiated an investigation at the request of the state's parks board into the incorporation of certain park roads as part of the state highway system after which the highway commission would assume maintenance of these roads. The highway commission accepted routes in eight parks as the original Park Roads in the state system on June 22, 1937. The charter routes of the system were located in the following parks:

1. Bastrop State Park
2. Caddo Lake State Park
3. Davis Mountains State Park
4. Longhorn Caverns State Park
5. Palo Duro Canyon State Park
6. Big Bend State Park, now a national park: PR 6 designation later reassigned to Goliad State Park and Historic Site
7. Meridian State Park
8. Big Spring State Park

== List ==
Number	Length (mi)	Length (km)	Southern or western terminus	Northern or eastern terminus	Formed	Removed	Notes
PR 1A	3.988	6.418	SH 21 near Bastrop State Park	PR 1A in Bastrop State Park	1937	current	Loops back onto itself
PR 1B	0.483	0.777	PR 1A in Bastrop State Park	Dead end at park cabins in Bastrop State Park	1937	current	
PR 1C	11.196	18.018	PR 1A in Bastrop State Park	FM 153 in Buescher State Park	1937	current	
PR 1D	0.106	0.171	PR 1A in Bastrop State Park	Bastrop State Park dining hall	1937	current	
PR 1E	0.948	1.526	PR 1C in Buescher State Park	PR 1C at Buescher State Park Headquarters	1940	current	
PR 2	1.110	1.786	FM 2198 in Caddo Lake State Park	Numerous small in-park roads	1937	current	
PR 3	1.160	1.867	SH 118 in Davis Mountains State Park	Indian Lodge in Davis Mountains State Park	1937	current	
PR 3A	2.529	4.070	PR 3 in Davis Mountains State Park	Davis Mountains State Park–Fort Davis National Historic Site boundary	1965	current	
PR 4	15.500	24.945	SH 29 near Buchanan Dam and Inks Lake State Park	US 281 south of Burnet near Longhorn Caverns State Park	1937	current	Listed on National Register of Historic Places
PR 5	—	—	SH 217 at Palo Duro Canyon State Park	Palo Duro Canyon State Park	1937	1949	Although officially assigned anew in 1949, this is essentially the same as the latter route as originally described
PR 5	10.239	16.478	SH 217 at Palo Duro Canyon State Park	Maintenance building inside park	1949	current	Loops back onto itself
PR 6	—	—	SH 227 (now US 385)	Big Bend National Park	1937	1946	Taken over by the National Park Service when Big Bend became a national park
PR 6	1.110	1.786	US 183 south of Goliad	Goliad State Park and Historic Site	1958	current	
PR 7	3.940	6.341	SH 22	Meridian State Park	1937	current	Loops back onto itself
PR 8	2.405	3.870	FM 700 in Big Spring State Park	FM 700 in Big Spring State Park	1937	current	Loops back onto itself
PR 9	—	—	SH 134 in Houston	San Jacinto Battleground State Historic Site	1939	1960	Renumbered to PR 1836
PR 10	1.193	1.920	Recreation center in Lockhart State Park	FM 20	1939	current	Originally only the driveways in the Lockhart State Park; later extended over former SH 310
PR 11	3.081	4.958	US 183	Palmetto State Park	1939	current	
PR 12	0.275	0.443	FM 1155 in Washington-on-the-Brazos	Park road in Washington-on-the-Brazos State Historic Site	1939	current	Former SH 229; 0.6 mile section removed in 1970 because it had been incorporated into the park
PR 13	4.170	6.711	SH 35	Goose Island in Goose Island State Park	1939	current	May have been SH 319 or SH 35A for a month
PR 14	1.56	2.51	SH 236	Mother Neff State Park	1940	current	
PR 15	7.227	11.631	SH 279	Lake Brownwood State Park	1940	current	
PR 16	2.932	4.719	FM 14 at Tyler State Park	CR 313	1940	current	Loops back onto itself, connection to county road
PR 17	1.272	2.047	SH 49	Daingerfield State Park	1940	current	
PR 18	—	—	I-27 in Lubbock	MacKenzie State Park	1940	1993	Returned to Lubbock when the park became a city park
PR 19	—	—	Kerrville State Park (now Kerrville-Schreiner Park)	SH 173 in Kerrville	1940	2006	Returned to Kerrville when the park became a city park
PR 20	—	—	US 281	Stephenville State Park	1940	1946	Cancelled because it is no longer a state park
PR 20	4.296	6.914	Entrance to Eisenhower State Park	Marina inside park	1960	current	Loops back onto itself
PR 21	9.295	14.959	Coyote Run Day-Use Area in Cleburne State Park	US 67	1940	current	Serves as main throughfare; outside of park, follows former SH 174 route
PR 22	.80	1.29	US 281	Mineral Wells State Park (now Lion Park)	1940	—	cancelled when no longer a state park
PR 22	15.59	25.09	Padre Island National Seashore	SH 358	1967	current	
PR 23	1.1	1.8	US 281	Blanco State Park	1940	current	
PR 24	1.62	2.61	FM 271	Bonham State Park	1943	current	Loops back onto itself
PR 25	3.392	5.459	SH 359 southwest of Mathis	Lake Corpus Christi State Park	1940	current	
PR 26	—	—	FM 20 at Lockhart State Park	PR 10 at Lockhart State Park	1940	1972	Became a portion of PR 10
PR 27	1.033	1.662	Fannin Battleground State Historic Site	US 59/FM 2987 in Fannin	1940	current	Former SH 162 and Spur 91
PR 28	2.307	3.713	SH 14	Fort Parker State Park	1941	current	
PR 29	4.10	6.60	US 83	Garner State Park	1941	current	
PR 30	0.277	0.446	Balmorhea State Park	SH 17 in Toyahvale	1941	current	
PR 31	7.99	12.86	Lake Sweetwater Park	US 80 east of Sweetwater	1943	1951	Became a portion of FM 1856
PR 31	2.786	4.484	SH 46	Guadalupe River State Park	1980	current	
PR 32	0.64	1.03	FM 89	Abilene State Park	1943	current	
PR 33	17.28	27.81	US 180 near Caddo	Possum Kingdom State Park	1944	current	
PR 34	0.457	0.735	FM 273	Lake Fannin State Park	1946	current	
PR 35	1.65	2.66	Fort Parker State Park	SH 14	1946	current	
PR 36	5.606	9.022	Camp Constantin BSA/Camp Grady Spruce YMCA	SH 16 in Palo Pinto County	1945	current	
PR 37	14.191	22.838	Bandera County Park in Lakehills	SH 16 near Helotes	1947	current	
PR 38	2.33	3.75	FM 1458 in San Felipe	Stephen F. Austin State Park	1949	current	Loops back onto itself
PR 39	—	—	Mission Parkway near Mission San José	Spur 536	1953	1993	Returned to San Antonio for further development of the site
PR 40	3.528	5.678	Huntsville State Park	SH 75 southeast of Huntsville	1955	current	
PR 41	1.673	2.692	I-20	Monahans Sandhills State Park	1957	current	
PR 42	1.373	2.210	FM 1154 – Beltway around Atlanta State Park		1960	current	
PR 43	2.497	4.019	FM 2062 – Beltway around northwest Bentsen-Rio Grande Valley State Park		1961	current	
PR 44	0.943	1.518	SH 21	Mission Tejas State Park	1962	current	
PR 45	—	—	Governor Hogg Shrine State Historical Park	SH 37	1962	2004	Returned to Quitman
PR 46	3.259	5.245	FM 2098	Falcon State Park	1963	current	
PR 47	1.775	2.857	FM 1244 – Beltway around Lake Whitney State Park		1964	current	
PR 48	4.488	7.223	Martin Dies Jr. State Park south area	Martin Dies Jr. State Park north area	1964	current	US 190 connects both ends of the park road
PR 49	0.134	0.216	Hodges Ranch Road	Kline Road / Redstone Ranch Road to RR 1	1965	current	Unsigned throughout most of its length
PR 50	0.4	0.64	Jim Hogg State Park	Firetower Road	1966	current	
PR 51	0.376	0.605	FM 2852	Varner-Hogg Plantation State Historic Site	1967	current	
PR 52	0.781	1.257	US 290	Lyndon B. Johnson State Park	1967	current	
PR 53	—	—	PR 22	SH 361 in Port Aransas	1967	1988	Transferred to SH 361
PR 54	1.047	1.685	US 283	Fort Griffin Campsite	1968	current	
PR 55	4.156	6.688	Wind Point Park	FM 1571	1968	current	
PR 56	2.666	4.291	Alabama-Coushatta Indian Reservation	US 190	1970	current	Replaced FM 2865
PR 57	5.8	9.3	Boat ramp in Lake Somerville State Park and Trailway	FM 60	1970	current	
PR 58	0.63	1.01	US 283	Fort Griffin State Historic Site	1970	current	
PR 59	1.409	2.268	FM 205	Dinosaur Valley State Park	1971	current	Loops back onto itself
PR 60	1.124	1.809	FM 224	Trinity River Authority of Lake Livingston	1971	current	Loops back onto itself
PR 61	1.785	2.873	Fort Richardson State Park	US 281 / US 380 / SH 114	1971	current	
PR 62	1.381	2.223	Copper Breaks State Park	SH 6	1972	current	
PR 63	1.018	1.638	FM 1954	Lake Arrowhead State Park	1973	current	
PR 64	1.419	2.284	FM 3285	Fairfield Lake State Park	1973	current	
PR 65	0.818	1.316	Lake Livingston State Park	FM 3126	1973	current	
PR 66	1.365	2.197	FM 3005 at entrance to Galveston Island State Park	Boat ramp inside park	1973	current	
PR 67	—	—	Depot inside State Railroad Park	US 84 at park entrance	1974	1975	Renumbered to PR 76
PR 67	0.451	0.726	Seminole Canyon State Park and Historic Site headquarters	US 90 at park entrance	1975	current	
PR 68	2.06	3.32	RM 2775 at the Hueco Tanks	Hueco Tanks	1974	current	
PR 69	0.283	0.455	SH 87	Sea Rim State Park southeast end	1974	current	
PR 70	0.82	1.32	Texas State Railroad History Museum	US 84	1976	current	
PR 71	0.743	1.196	US 180	Lake Mineral Wells State Park & Trailway east end	1977	current	
PR 72	4.346	6.994	FM 762 near Long Point	Brazos Bend State Park	1978	current	
PR 73	1.888	3.038	South Llano River State Park	US 377	1982	current	
PR 74	0.918	1.477	Alma Drive in Lumberton	Village Creek State Park	1994	current	
PR 76	.401	0.645	Depot inside State Railroad Park	US 84 at park entrance	1975	current	Former PR 67
PR 77	2.538	4.085	Palo Pinto Mountains State Park	FM 2372 west of Strawn	2017	current	
PR 100	13.198	21.240	SH 100 at the Queen Isabella Causeway	Padre Island National Seashore	1968	current	
PR 138	2.25	3.62	Business US 90-U in Houston	Garret Road in Houston	2014	current	
PR 1836	7.234	11.642	Battleground Road (former SH 134) in Houston	San Jacinto Battleground State Historic Site	1960	current	Former PR 9; number chosen to commemorate the date that Texas won its independence from Mexico
Former
