= Juan Seguín =

Tejano politician and military leader (1806–1890)

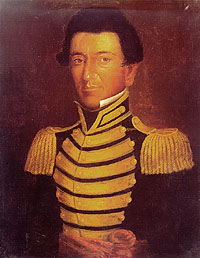

Republic of Texas Senator from Bexar District
- In office December 5, 1837 – February 5, 1840
- Preceded by: Thomas Jefferson Green
- Succeeded by: William H. Daingerfield

101st and 110th Mayor of San Antonio
- In office 1834–1835
- Preceded by: Miguel Arciniega
- Succeeded by: José Ángel Navarro
- In office 1841–1842
- Preceded by: John William Smith
- Succeeded by: Francis Guilbeau

Member of the San Antonio City Council
- In office 1828–1833

Justice of the Peace of Bexar County, Texas
- In office 1852–1856

County Judge of Wilson County, Texas
- In office 1869–1869

Personal details
- Born: Juan Nepomuceno Seguín; 27 October 1806 San Antonio de Béjar, Province of Texas, Viceroyalty of New Spain (now Texas, U.S.)
- Died: 27 August 1890 (aged 83) Nuevo Laredo, Tamaulipas, Mexico
- Party: Democratic Party
- Spouse: María Gertrudis Flores de Abrego (m. 1825)

Military service
- Allegiance: Republic of Texas; Mexico
- Branch/service: Texian Army; Army of the Republic of Texas; Mexican Army (Mexican–American War)
- Years of service: 1835–1836, 1836–1842 (Texas); 1846–1848 (Mexico)
- Rank: Colonel
- Unit: Texian volunteer and regular army
- Battles/wars: Texas Revolution: Battle of Concepcion; Siege of Bexar; Siege of the Alamo; Runaway Scrape; Battle of San Jacinto; Texas-Indian Wars

Juan Seguin's "Rancheros" Volunteers
- Flag used by Juan Seguin's Volunteers during the Siege of the Alamo
- Active: 1835–1836
- Country: Republic of Texas
- Allegiance: Republic of Texas
- Type: volunteers (militia)
- Role: cavalry, infantry
- Size: 160
- Part of: Texian Army
- Engagements: Texas Revolution: Siege of Bexar; Siege of the Alamo; Battle of San Jacinto

Commanders
- Notable commanders: Stephen F. Austin; Sam Houston; Juan Seguín; William Travis †; James Bowie †; Davy Crockett †

Juan Nepomuceno Seguín (October 27, 1806 – August 27, 1890) was a Tejano political and military figure of the Texas Revolution who helped to establish the independence of Texas, and also fought against those same soldiers, serving under Santa Anna in the Mexican–American War of 1846–1848. Numerous places and institutions are named in his honor, including the county seat of Seguin in Guadalupe County, the Juan N. Seguin Memorial Interchange in Houston, Juan Seguin Monument in Seguin, World War II Liberty Ship SS Juan N. Seguin, Seguin High School in Arlington.

== Early life ==
Juan Nepomuceno Seguín was born on October 27, 1806, in San Antonio de Bexar, Province of Texas, Viceroyalty of New Spain, to Juan José María Erasmo Seguin, a second-generation Bexareño, and Maria Josefa Becerra. As the son of a postal administrator, he would help his mother in business, while his father was one of the drafting rapporteurs for the Mexican Constitution of 1824. In 1825, Seguin married María Gertrudis Flores de Abrego. They had ten children. He was elected an alderman in December, 1828 and served on numerous electoral boards before becoming the San Antonio alcalde (mayor) in December 1833. He then served as political chief of Bexar in 1834, when the previous chief became ill. In 1835, he led a relief force to Monclova, when the Federalist Governor appealed for help.

== Texas Revolution ==
As a teenager in Mexico, he had a strong interest in politics. While Antonio López de Santa Anna repealed the Mexican Constitution of 1824, Seguín was very critical of his contemporary Mexican leader. Years later Seguín gladly joined the Texas Revolution to rid the area of Santa Anna's rule. In 1835–1836, Seguín recruited and commanded troops for the Texian Army. (Note: Juan Seguín married María Gertrudis Flores de Abrego, a member of one of San Antonio's well known ranching families. There were four Jose Flores De Abrego sons, (brothers-in-law to Juan Seguín), who joined in with him. (see de la Teja (1991), p. 18) Captain Salvador Flores, Captain Manuel N. Flores, Lieutenant Nepomuceno Flores, and Private Jose Maria Flores all participated in the Texas Revolution, on the Texian side.) He was commissioned a captain by Stephen F. Austin in October 1835 and was tasked with supplying the Texian troops with food and provisions. Seguín sent out scouting parties to the Missions of San Antonio in search of a suitable base camp for the Texians and participated in the early successful Battle of Concepcion.

Martín Perfecto de Cos was appointed as military governor over Texas by his brother-in-law Antonio López de Santa Anna, and established his headquarters in San Antonio on October 9, 1835. Upwards of 160 rancheros (Mexican ranch owners) and other Tejanos under Seguín, José Carbajal, Plácido Benavides, Salvador Flores and Manuel Leal joined Austin and approximately 400 Texians at the Siege of Béxar. After a two-month battle, Cos surrendered on December 9.

In January 1836, Seguín was commissioned as a captain in the regular Texas army. (Note: According to records, Seguín did not appear at the Convention to accept his appointment in the regular army; Jesus (Comanche) Cuellar filled in for him. He instead took the position to become the first judge of San Antonio. According to Lindley, he was not regular army until after departing from the Alamo as a courier on February 25. See de la Teja pg.79, Lindley pg.113) Upon the return of Santa Anna's army, Seguín joined William B. Travis on February 23, in the Battle of the Alamo. Although serving at the Alamo during the thirteen-day siege, he did not actually participate in the final battle of the Alamo. He was chosen to carry the Alamo message through enemy lines, that the Texans "shall never surrender or retreat". Seguín got that message through to the other soldiers on the Texian side. He then returned with men to reinforce the Alamo, but it had already fallen to Santa Anna's army.

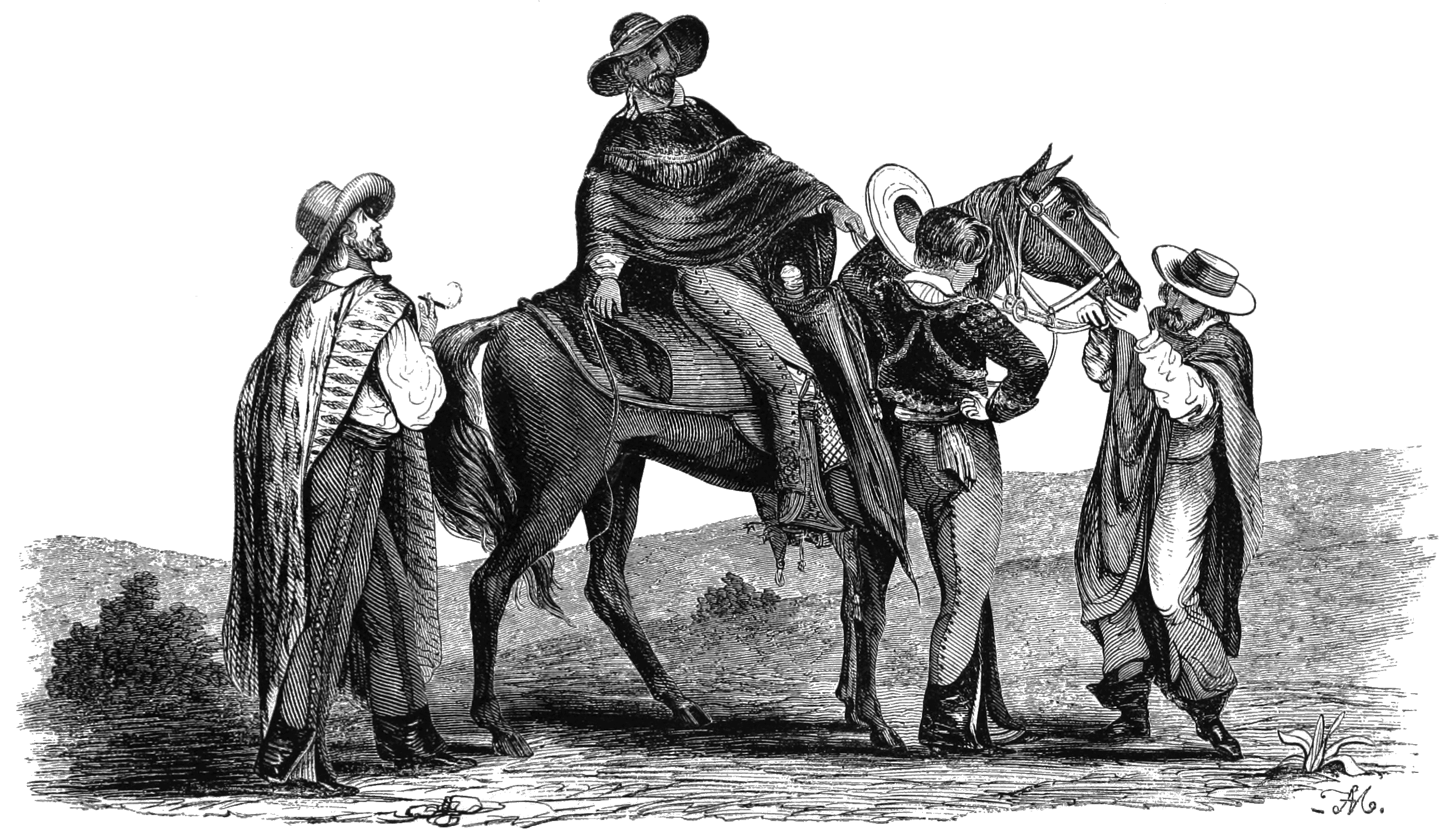
Juan Seguín's Volunteers were Texas Tejano Mexican ranch owners or "Rancheros" who joined the Texian Army to fight Mexico in the Texas Revolution of 1835–1836.

After the Alamo, he re-formed cavalry companies at Gonzales and acted as the rear guard, providing protection for fleeing Texas families during the Runaway Scrape. His company, with Captain Moseley Baker's company, blocked the Mexican army from crossing the Brazos River, preventing them from overtaking the Texians. His cavalry command, participating as infantry with Sherman's company, fought in the victorious Battle of San Jacinto. In May 1836, he was promoted to lieutenant colonel. On June 4, as a representative of the Republic of Texas, he accepted the formal surrender of the Mexican forces in the Alamo.

== Life under the Republic of Texas ==
After Texas became a Republic, he was the head of the San Antonio military, commanding a force to defend the western frontier. Texas army Brigadier General Felix Huston ordered Seguín in early 1837 to arrange for burial of the Alamo defenders' remains that had been left where they were burned. Ashes were identified and collected at three unrecorded sites. Prior to the February 25 funeral, the casket lay in "the parish church". An account provided by Seguin, in the March 28, 1837 issue of the Telegraph and Texas Register, states they were buried where the majority of ashes had been found, but was not specific about the location. He told historian Reuben Potter in 1861 that the site was in a peach orchard near the mission. Twenty-eight years later in correspondence with Hamilton P. Bee, Seguín remembered placing the remains in a tomb inside the "Cathedral of San Antonio". Remains believed to be those of the Alamo defenders were discovered at the Cathedral of San Fernando in 1936, the battle's centennial. Time had decayed their original container, and they were re-interred in a marble sarcophagus. Purported to hold the ashes of Travis, Bowie and Crockett, some have doubted it can be proven whose remains are actually entombed there.

Seguín was elected as a Texas Senator from 1837 to 1840 and worked closely with Congressman José Antonio Navarro to ensure legislation that would be in the best interest of the citizenry of Texas, who were quickly becoming the political minority. In 1839, Seguín, captain of a Texas force of about fifty-four men, again protected the colonists in the Henry Karnes campaign against the hostile Comanche Indians. In 1839, at a town thirty miles east of San Antonio, he was honored by parade and celebration; that newly named town would now bear his own name, Seguin. In 1840, he resigned his congressional seat in order to join a controversial campaign against the Centralist government in Mexico City. He became mayor of San Antonio in 1841.

Texas became flooded with adventurous and land-hungry Anglo-Americans who were unfamiliar with the native Texans' history and their loyal support of Texas. Seguin's leadership and loyalty was challenged by these newcomers. Refusing to burn San Antonio to the ground by order of the new head of the Texas military was just the beginning.

In 1842, San Antonio was overrun by Santa Anna's forces. During March 1842, Colonel Seguin and the citizens of San Antonio sought refuge at Manuel Flores' Ranch in the city of Seguin, Texas. A counterattack was planned, and even though Seguín pursued the army of Ráfael Vásquez, chasing them from Texas, he was deemed to be to blame for the attack.

Seguín resigned from office in April, due to threats on his life. Opposition to his defense of Texas rights, adversities, and false charges that he was aiding the Mexican army proved too much to bear. He fled to Mexico to "seek refuge amongst my enemies", where he was captured, arrested and coerced to enlist in the Mexican army as a staff officer. He returned to San Antonio with the opposition army of Adrian Woll in September 1842 and later served under Santa Anna in the Mexican–American War of 1846–1848.

== Later life ==
In February 1848, Seguín requested permission to return to Texas. By the year's end, he had returned, building a home in 1852; adjacent to his father Erasmo Seguín's house, and ranching in Floresville, Texas. He was elected to two terms as Justice of the Peace of Bexar County in 1852 and 1854, and became a founding father of the Democratic Party in Bexar county. In 1858, he published his life memoirs. Seguín served as County Judge in Wilson County in 1869. However, business dealings occasionally took him back to Mexico, and in around 1883 he settled in Nuevo Laredo, Tamaulipas, Mexico, to be near his son Santiago, who was mayor. He died there on August 27, 1890. His remains were returned to Texas in 1974 and as part of the nation's Bicentennial celebration were reinterred in his namesake town, Seguin, during ceremonies on July 4, 1976. A large monument, depicting him on horseback waving his saber, now honors his service to Texas, in the downtown Seguin Central Park.

== Legacy ==
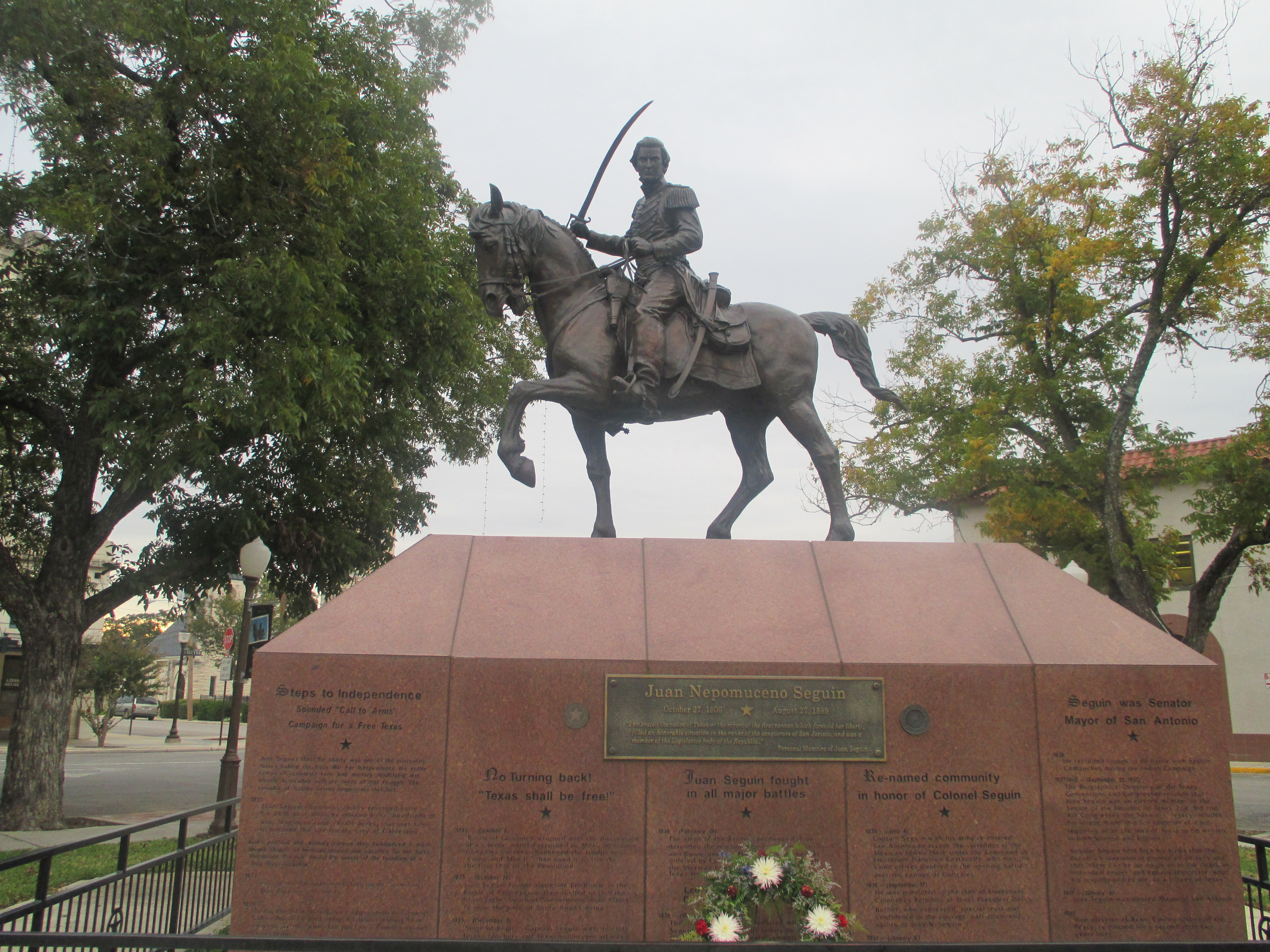
A statue of Juan Seguín in the City of Seguin.

- 1838 – Walnut Springs in Guadalupe County, Texas was renamed Seguin.
- 1908–2010 – Juan Seguin School (a.k.a. Juan Seguin Elementary School), Guadalupe County, originally established for children of Mexico's refugees from the Mexican Revolution.
- June 13, 2001 – Juan N. Seguin Memorial Interchange, State Highway 225 between Houston and La Porte, HB3460 designated by the 77th Regular Session, 2001 of the Texas State Legislature
- June 13, 2001 – Juan N. Seguin Boulevard, Park Road 1836 between Independence Parkway and the San Jacinto Battleground
- October 28, 2000 – A statue of Juan N. Seguin sculpted by Erik Christianson of Bulverde was erected in the public square south of the courthouse in the city of Seguin.
- War II Liberty Ship SS Juan N. Seguin, Hull No. 2934. The builder's plaque and ships bell from Juan N. Seguin hangs inside the city hall in Seguin.
- Juan Seguin High School - Arlington ISD.
- Juan Seguin Elementary Fort Bend Independent School District
- Juan Seguin Elementary, McAllen ISD, McAllen, TX
- Juan Seguin Early Childhood Center, Lamar CISD, Richmond, Texas
- Juan Seguin Elementary, La Joya Independent School District, Mission, Hidalgo County
- 2007– Seguin Circle , River Bend Golf Club , Floresville, Texas Commemorates exact location of the home Juan Seguin built next to his father Erasmo, in Floresville.
- October 25, 2014 Juan Seguin Texas Ranger memorial placed near grave in Seguin, Texas dedicated by Former Texas Rangers Association.
- Juan N. Seguin Elementary School in Eagle Pass. Formerly called Robert E. Lee Elementary School.
- Juan Nepomuceno Seguin Statue, Statues of Heroes at The Alamo, by Enrique "Kiko" Guerra

== In popular culture ==
=== Film and TV ===
- 1955 – The Last Command, portrayed by Edward Colmans.
- 1960 – The Alamo, portrayed by Joseph Calleia.
- 1982 – American Playhouse: Seguin, portrayed by A Martinez and written by Jesús Salvador Treviño.
- 1986 – Gone to Texas (retitled from Houston: The Legend of Texas), portrayed by Peter Gonzales Falcon.
- 1987 – The Alamo: 13 Days to Glory, portrayed by Michael Wren.
- 1988 – Alamo: The Price of Freedom, portrayed by Derek Caballero.
- 1994 – James A. Michener's Texas, portrayed by Roland Rodriguez.
- 2004 – The Alamo, portrayed by Jordi Mollà.
- 2015 – Texas Rising, portrayed by Raúl Méndez

=== Books ===
- 2012 – The novel Los Tejanos and Lost Cause, a fictionalized imagining of Seguin's perspective on the Mexican–American War.

== Tejanos who served under Juan Seguín ==
Tejano volunteers under Juan Seguín

Tejano volunteers under the command of Juan Seguín for all or part of their service in the Texas Revolution and the Republic of Texas. Note that Seguin's men at the Alamo were scouts/couriers going in and out, between San Antonio and nearby Gonzales, the rallying point for volunteers.

Siege of Béxar

- Juan Abamillo
- José Alamedo
- José María Arocha
- Juan José Arocha
- Plácido Benavides
- Juan Antonio Badillo
- Manuel Bueno
- Clemente Bustillos
- Mateo Casillas
- Pablo Casillas
- Luis Castañon
- Agapito Cervantes
- Carlos Chacón
- Miguel Cilba
- Ciriaco Contes
- Julian Contes
- Antonio Cruz y Arocha
- Antonio Curvier (aka Curbier)
- Domingo Díaz
- Francisco Díaz
- Julian Díaz
- José Gregorio Esparza
- Ignacio Espinoza
- Manuel N. Flores
- Salvador Flores
- Antonio Fuentes
- Manuel Gallardo
- Pedro Gaona
- Casimiro García
- Clemente García
- Guadalupe García
- Jesus García
- Simon García
- Alexandro de la Garza
- José María de la Garza
- Marcelino de la Garza
- Paulino de la Garza
- Francisco Gómez
- Jesús Gómez
- Gabriel Gonzalez
- Brigido Guerrero
- Antonio Hernández
- Eduardo Hernández
- Gregorio Hernández
- Blas María Herrera
- Pedro Herrera
- Toribio Herrera
- Damacio Jiménez
- José Domingo Losoya
- Toribio Losoya
- Juan Maldonado
- José María Mancha
- Pablo Mansolo
- Francisco Miranda
- Andrés Nava
- Nepomuceno Navarro
- Juan José Palacios
- Eduardo Ramirez
- Vicente Ramos
- Ambrosio Rodríguez
- Ramón Rubio
- Antonio Ruiz
- Esmerigeldo Ruiz
- Francisco Salinas
- Miguel (Margil) Salinas
- Pablo Salinas
- Agapito Tejado
- Francisco Valdéz
- Esteban Villarreal
- José Zúñiga

Battle of the Alamo

- Juan Abamillo
- Simón Arreola
- Juan Antonio Badillo
- José María Arocha
- Juan María Cabrera
- Cesario Carmona
- Antonio Cruz y Arocha
- José Gregorio Esparza
- Antonio Fuentes
- Alexandro de la Garza
- Brigido Guerrero
- Damacio Jiménez (aka Ximenes)
- Jose Maria Jimenez
- Toribio Losoya
- Andrés Nava
- Jose Sebastian Pacheco (aka Luciano Granado)
- Marcos Veramendi

Battle of San Jacinto

- José María Arocha
- Manuel Arocha (aka Manuel de Arocha)
- Simón Arreola
- Andre Bárcinas
- Manuel Bueno
- Juan María Cabrera
- Cesario Carmona
- Gabriel Casillas
- Cayetano Castillo
- Antonio Cruz y Arocha
- Francisco Cuellar
- Antonio Curvier (aka Curbier)
- Fernando Curvier (aka Curbier)
- Matias Curvier (aka Curbier)
- Lucio Enriquez (aka Enriques)
- Manuel N. Flores
- Martin Flores
- Nepomuceno Flores
- Pedro Flores
- Salvador Flores
- Pedro Herrera
- Jose Maria Jimenez
- Juan Jimenez
- Jose Polinio Lavjina
- Narcisco Leal
- Juan Lopez
- Pedro Lopez
- Martin Maldonado
- Tomás Maldonado
- José María Mancha
- Juan Martinez
- Tomas Martinez
- Miguel Mata
- José Antonio Menchaca
- Jose Molina
- Manuel Montalvo
- Crecensio Montez
- Hipolito Montoya
- Antonio Olivas
- Nepomuceno Navarro
- Jacinto Peña
- Damacio de los Reyes
- Eduardo Ramirez
- Ambrosio Rodríguez
- Jose Antonio Rodríguez
- Pablo Salinas
- Manuel Antonio Santiago Tarin
- Antonio Treviño
- Esteban Uran
- Andres Varcinas
- Juan Zambrano
- Vicente Zepeda

Republic of Texas service post-San Jacinto

- Eusebio Almaguez
- Miguel Arcieniega Jr.
- Andre Bárcinas
- Antonio Benites
- Anselmo Bergara
- Manuel Bueno
- Pedro Camarillo
- Mariano Carbajal
- Ignacio Castillo
- Nemecio de la Cerda
- Agapito Cervantes
- Augustin Chaves
- Antonio Conix
- Simón Contreras
- Trinidad Coy
- Antonio Cruz y Arocha
- Antonio Curvier (aka Curbier)
- Nicholas Delgado
- Polonio Díaz
- Ignacio Espinoza
- Antonio Estrada
- Manuel Estrada
- Eusibio Farias
- Manuel N. Flores
- Martin Flores
- Nepomuceno Flores
- Salvador Flores
- Agapio Gaitan
- Damacio Galban
- Leandro Garza
- Vicente Garza
- Manuel Hernández
- Felipe Jaimes
- José María Landera
- Xavier Lazo
- Cayetano Lerma
- Manuel Lopez
- Juan Maldonado
- Gabriel Martinez
- Manuel Martinez
- Miguel Mata
- Manuel Montalvo
- Manuel Montate
- Francisco Morales
- Pedro Flores Morales
- José Antonio Navarro
- José Luciano Navarro
- Jacinto Peña
- James Quina
- Eduardo Ramirez
- José María Rios
- Cayetano Rivas
- Ambrosio Rodríguez
- Francisco Rodríguez
- Juan Rodríguez
- Mariano Romano
- Cristobal Rubio
- Antonio Ruiz
- Franco Ruiz
- Antonio Sambraño
- Antonio Sanches
- Guadalupe de los Santos
- Nicolas de los Santos
- Juan Sombraña
- Gregorio Sota
- Ramon Trevino
- José María Valdéz
- Juan Vallanceon
- Marcos Veramendi
- Antonio Hernandez Zavala
- Jesus Zavala

Sources:

- "San Jacinto Museum of History - The Kemp Sketches". San Jacinto Museum of History.
- MacDonald, L. Lloyd (2009). Tejanos in the 1835 Texas Revolution. Pelican Publishing. pp. 260–262. ISBN 978-1589806382.
- Teja, Jesus F. De la; Matovina, Timothy; Poché, Justin (2013). Recollections of a Tejano Life: Antonio Menchaca in Texas History. University of Texas Press. p. 90. ISBN 978-0292748651.
- Texas State Archives, Republic of Texas Claims
- Texas A & M professor Wallace L. McKeehan, also on the school's Board of Regents website: Hispanic Texian Patriots in the Struggle for Independence
- Handbook of Texas

== See also ==
- Erasmo Seguín, Juan's father

== Notes ==
=== Bibliography ===
- Brode, Douglas; Parker, Fess (2009). Shooting Stars of the Small Screen Encyclopedia of TV Western Actors, 1946–present. University of Texas Press. ISBN 978-0-292-71849-4.
- De la Teja, Jesus (1991). A Revolution Remembered: The Memoirs and Selected Correspondence of Juan N. Seguin. Austin, TX: State House Press. ISBN 0-938349-68-6.
- Edmondson, J.R. (2000). The Alamo Story-From History to Current Conflicts. Plano, TX: Republic of Texas Press. ISBN 1-55622-678-0.
- Groneman, Bill (1990). Alamo Defenders, A Genealogy: The People and Their Words. Austin, TX: Eakin Press. ISBN 0-89015-757-X.
- Hardin, Stephen L. (1994). Texian Iliad – A Military History of the Texas Revolution. Austin, TX: University of Texas Press. ISBN 0-292-73086-1. OCLC 29704011.
- Lindley, Thomas Ricks (2003). Alamo Traces: New Evidence and New Conclusions. Lanham, MD: Republic of Texas Press. ISBN 1-55622-983-6.
- Lozano, Ruben Rendon (1985). Viva Texas: The Story of the Tejanos, the Mexican-born Patriots of the Texas Revolution. San Antonio, TX: The Alamo Press. ISBN 0-943260-02-7.
- Lord, Walter (1961). A Time to Stand. Lincoln, NE: University of Nebraska Press. ISBN 0-8032-7902-7.
- Matovina, Timothy M. (1995). The Alamo Remembered: Tejano Accounts and Perspectives. Austin, TX: University of Texas Press. ISBN 0-292-75186-9.
- Menchaca, Antonio; Poche, Justin; Matovina, Timothy; de la Teja, Jesus (2013). Recollections of a Tejano Life: Antonio Menchaca in Texas History. Austin, TX: University of Texas Press. ISBN 978-0-292-74865-1.
- Moore, Stephen L. (2006). Savage Frontier: Rangers, Riflemen, and Indian Wars in Texas, Volume II, 1838–1839. Denton, TX: University of North Texas Press. ISBN 1-57441-206-X.
- Nofi, Albert A. (1992). The Alamo and the Texas War of Independence, September 30, 1835 to April 21, 1836: Heroes, Myths, and History. Conshohocken, PA: Combined Books, Inc. ISBN 0-938289-10-1.
- Poyo, Gerald Eugene (1996). Tejano Journey, 1770–1850. University of Texas Press. ISBN 978-0-292-76570-2.
- Schoelwer, Susan Prendergast (March 1986). "About the West: Forgotten Heroes of the Alamo". Journal of the West. 25 (2): 73–81.
- Thrall, Homer S. (1879). A Pictorial History of Texas. St. Louis, MO: N.D. Thompson. OCLC 1059768.
- Todish, Timothy J.; Todish, Terry; Spring, Ted (1998). Alamo Sourcebook, 1836: A Comprehensive Guide to the Battle of the Alamo and the Texas Revolution. Austin, TX: Eakin Press. ISBN 978-1-57168-152-2.
- Woods, J. M. (1908). Don Erasmo Seguin. Gaylord Brother Inc.

Political offices
Preceded by José Francisco Ruiz; 1836–1837; Thomas Jefferson Green; 1837 (25 days only)	Republic of Texas Senate; Republic of Texas Senator from Bexar District; Juan Seguín; 1837–1840	Succeeded by William H. Daingerfield; 1840–1842
