= Ludovic Colquhoun =

Republic of Texas Senator from Bexar
- In office June 27, 1842 – September 1842
- Preceded by: William H. Daingerfield (Note: William Henry Daingerfield resigned to accept the position of the Secretary of Treasury and Colquhoun won the subsequent special election.)
- Succeeded by: John William Smith

Personal details
- Born: 1804 Cumberland, Dumbartonshire, Scotland
- Died: December 4, 1882 (aged 78) San Antonio, Texas
- Spouse: Frances Colquhoun
- Profession: Senator; Soldier; Merchant
- Known for: Abduction by the Mexican Army while in office

Ludovic Colquhoun (1804–1882) also known as Ludwig Colquhoun, was a Republic of Texas Senator and a merchant of San Antonio.

== Early life ==
Ludovic Colquhoun was born in 1804 in Cumberland, Dumbartonshire, Scotland. He first immigrated to New Orleans, Louisiana, then moved to Texas in 1837, where he ventured in real estate and as a merchant. In Texas he gained vast land holdings, so much so, that it was necessary to hire a manager to assist him.

== Texas Senator ==
He was appointed as a Senator of the Texas Republic from the District of Bexar in 1842. His term was cut short when San Antonio was taken by surprise by the Mexican Army in September of that year. At the time, Colquhoun was involved in a dispute with Samuel Maverick over ownership of land on the Cibolo Creek. The case was being tried in San Antonio, when the Mexican Army appeared there on the 11th.

== POW ==
Due to the critical situation, Colquhoun became a soldier in Captain Chauncey Johnson's resistance forces in San Antonio. A battle began but the Texans were badly outnumbered and overwhelmed. Many were taken prisoner during this invasion of the Republic of Texas by Adrian Woll during September, 1842. Colquhoun was among the members of this group. He was marched to Mexico and imprisoned at Perote Prison from 1842 to 1844.

While in prison, being knowledgeable of the lands from his vast dealings and work as a surveyor, he fashioned several maps to aid in the escape of Thomas Jefferson Green and several other of the imprisoned Texans.

Colquhoun was eventually released by request of Andrew Jackson through intervention by diplomat Waddy Thompson.

== Later years ==
By 1850, he had reestablished himself as a merchant and citizen of San Antonio. During the 1860s, when the American Civil War broke out, he was appointed an official Confederate States Depositary. He was married to an English-born wife, Frances. While married to Frances, he fathered seven children with Aurelia Wilson (b. 10 Dec. 1836, Charleston, S.C. – d. 29 Mar. 1923, San Antonio, TX) an African American woman who was born into slavery and moved from South Carolina to Texas as an enslaved woman. Colquhoun and Wilson's children were named Fannie (Wilson) Holley (b. 1864), Dora Wilson (b. c 1865), Henry (b. c 1865), Kate Wilson (1876), Ella (Wilson) Robinson (1877), Rosa (Wilson) Sales (1878), and Minnie (Wilson) Plummer (1879).

Ludovic Colquhoun has many living African American descendants. The Bella Cameron School in San Antonio is named after Wilson and Colquhoun's granddaughter (one of Fannie's daughters), Bella (Holley) Cameron (b. 23 Oct. 1903 – d. 7 Sep. 1966), who was a beloved African American educational leader in San Antonio. Although he was a Texas senator and wealthy San Antonio merchant and real estate holder, Aurelia and her seven children, who were fathered by Ludovic Colquhoun, did not inherit anything when he died and have not been recognized in the historical record.

He died December 4, 1882, and was buried at City Cemetery Number 1, in San Antonio, Texas.

== Notes ==
- Moore, Stephen L. (2010), Savage Frontier: Rangers, Riflemen, and Indian Wars in Texas, Volume IV, Denton, TX: University of North Texas Press, ISBN 978-1-57441-294-9

Political offices
Preceded by William H. Daingerfield; 1840–1842	Republic of Texas Senate; Republic of Texas Senator from Bexar District; 1842; Abducted while in office	Succeeded by John William Smith; 1842–1845
