= William H. Daingerfield =

American politician (1808–1878)

106th Mayor of San Antonio
- In office 1838–1838
- Preceded by: John William Smith

Personal details
- Born: 1808 Alexandria, Virginia
- Died: 1878 (aged 69–70) Prince George's County, Maryland
- Profession: Lawyer

William H. Daingerfield (1808–1878) was the one-hundred-and-sixth Mayor of San Antonio, Texas.

== Early life ==
William H. Daingerfield was born in Alexandria, Virginia in 1808.

Daingerfield attended the University of Virginia from 1828–1829, before becoming a lawyer in Maryland. He was also a farmer in the state.

== Texas politician ==
He was the one-hundred-and-sixth mayor of San Antonio, Texas (1838), a Texas Senator for Bexar County (1840–1842), Texas Secretary of the Treasury (1842–1844) and chargé d'affaires for the Republic of Texas in the Netherlands (1844–1845).

== Later life ==
He moved to Washington D.C. in 1860 to again practice law. 18 years later, he died in Prince George's County, Maryland.

Political offices
Preceded by Juan Seguín; 1837–1840	Republic of Texas Senate; Republic of Texas Senator from Bexar District; 1840–1842	Succeeded by Ludovic Colquhoun (1842 abducted by Mexican Army); John William Smith; 1842–1845
