= John William Smith (politician) =

Texian politician (1792–1845)

Republic of Texas Senator from Bexar
- In office November 14, 1842 – January 12, 1845
- Preceded by: Ludovic Colquhoun
- Succeeded by: Samuel H. Luckie

105th, 109th, and 112th Mayor of San Antonio
- In office 1837–1838
- Preceded by: José María Salinas
- Succeeded by: William H. Daingerfield
- In office 1840–1841
- Preceded by: Samuel Maverick
- Succeeded by: Juan Seguín
- In office 1842–1844
- Preceded by: Francis Guilbeau
- Succeeded by: Edward Dwyer

Personal details
- Born: William John Smith; November 4, 1792 Virginia, United States
- Died: January 12, 1845 (aged 52) Washington-on-the-Brazos, Republic of Texas
- Spouse: Harriet Stone (m. 1821, divorced) María de Jesús Delgado Curbelo (m. 1835)
- Profession: Politician; public servant; soldier

Military service
- Allegiance: Republic of Texas
- Branch/service: Texian Army
- Battles/wars: Texas Revolution; Siege of Bexar (POW); Battle of Concepción; Battle of San Jacinto

John William Smith (November 4, 1792 – January 12, 1845) was an American and Texian politician and soldier who was the first mayor of San Antonio after Texas independence and a senator of the Republic of Texas. He participated in the Texas Revolution as a soldier and scout in the Texian Army.

== Early life ==
Born William John Smith in Virginia as the second son of John and Isabel Smith, he grew up in Ralls County, Missouri, after moving from his birth state of Virginia, and received an expensive education. He married Harriet Stone in Hannibal, Missouri, sometime between 1821 and 1822. They had three known children, Samuel, Mary Elizabeth and Lucinda.

His first elected position was in 1822 as Sheriff of Ralls County and state and county tax collector. He resigned from the post in 1826, just before the birth of his third child, and planned to move to Texas. His wife did not come to Texas, and eventually Smith extracted a promise from her for divorce, or she was persuaded to file for divorce for reason of abandonment by her brothers. She ultimately came to Texas with her second husband, James Boyce.

== Move to San Antonio ==
Smith moved to Mexican Texas and settled first in Gonzales, then La Bahía, and moved to San Antonio in 1827. Smith and his brother Francis were baptized into the Catholic faith on May 20, 1828, at the Cathedral of San Fernando. He switched his first and middle names while in Texas, supposedly because William was difficult to pronounce in the Spanish language. He was known throughout the town as "El Colorado" or "redhead". He served in the city as military storekeeper until 1835, also working as a surveyor like his Texas contemporaries; James Kerr, Byrd Lockhart and Arthur Swift, and a civil engineer. When he was a 38-year-old, he married a 15-year-old girl named María de Jesús Delgado Curbelo. María's great grandfather, Juan Curbelo, came from the Canary Islands.

== Texas Revolution ==
Through time, Smith had become upset by the occupation of San Antonio by Mexican Colonel Domingo Ugartechea. He was arrested with A. C. Holmes and Samuel Maverick and was saved by his wife's pleas, which enabled him to escape and guide the final assault in the Siege of Bexar. He was also at the Battle of Concepción.

He served twice as a messenger during the Siege of the Alamo. On February 23, Smith and John Sutherland were sent by Travis as scouts to assess the Mexican Army's strength and position. Upon locating the Mexican Army in strength, he immediately returned to the Alamo. That evening he was dispatched to Gonzales, Texas, with a message from Travis. He returned to the Alamo from Gonzales, Texas, on March 1. Before the final Battle of the Alamo and its fall, William B. Travis sent Smith with a message for Washington-on-the-Brazos, allowing him to escape the fate that all Texas soldiers defending San Antonio ultimately succumbed to. After delivering the message, he returned with men to fight in the battle but heard no gunfire as their horses drank at Cibolo Creek. He was informed that the Battle of the Alamo was over and headed eastward to fight at San Jacinto, the final battle of the revolution.

== Mayor of San Antonio ==
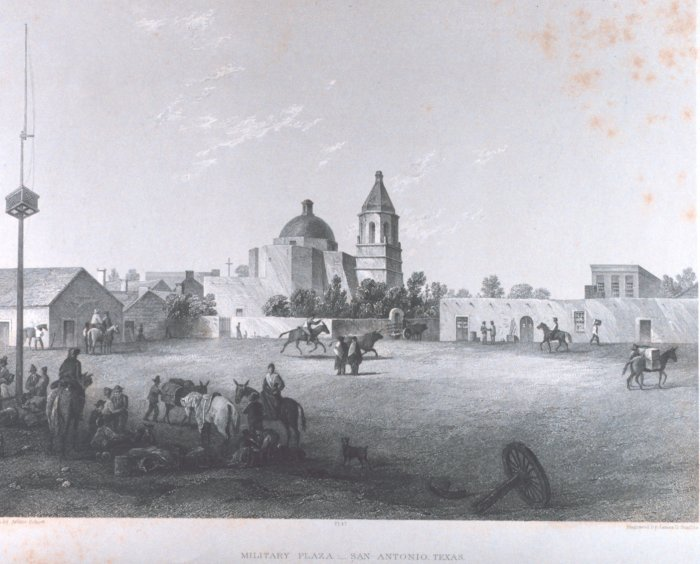
The city close to the time of Smith's mayorship

He was elected Mayor on September 19, 1837, and served until 1838. As mayor, he prohibited public bathing in the San Antonio River and San Pedro Creek between the hours of 5 a.m. and 8p.m. He established that businesses must close at 9 p.m. on Sunday, and allowed for milk cows in Downtown as long as they were milked and in the corral before 10 pm. Smith also regulated dog ownership, taxing citizens $2.00 for bitches and $0.50 for males. Although he did not run for re-election in 1838, he would run in 1840 and was elected. He served his second time as mayor until 1844. During this time, he constructed the city's first bridge across the San Antonio River on Commerce Street.

He was for a time postmaster of San Antonio. Other positions he held in Bexar County were alderman, tax assessor, clerk of the County Court, clerk of the Board of Land Commissioners, clerk of the County Probate Court, county treasurer.

== Senator of the Republic ==
During the Republic years, Smith served as an Indian commissioner. From 1842 to January 12, 1845, he served the Republic as a Texas Senator.

== Death ==
He died on January 12, 1845, most likely from pneumonia. He was succeeded in the Republic of Texas Senate by Samuel H. Luckie. He is regarded as a hero and was honored as such upon his death.

| Preceded by Ludovic Colquhoun | Republic of Texas Senator from Bexar; 1842–1845 | Succeeded by Samuel H. Luckie |
