= Meridian State Park =

State park in Texas, United States

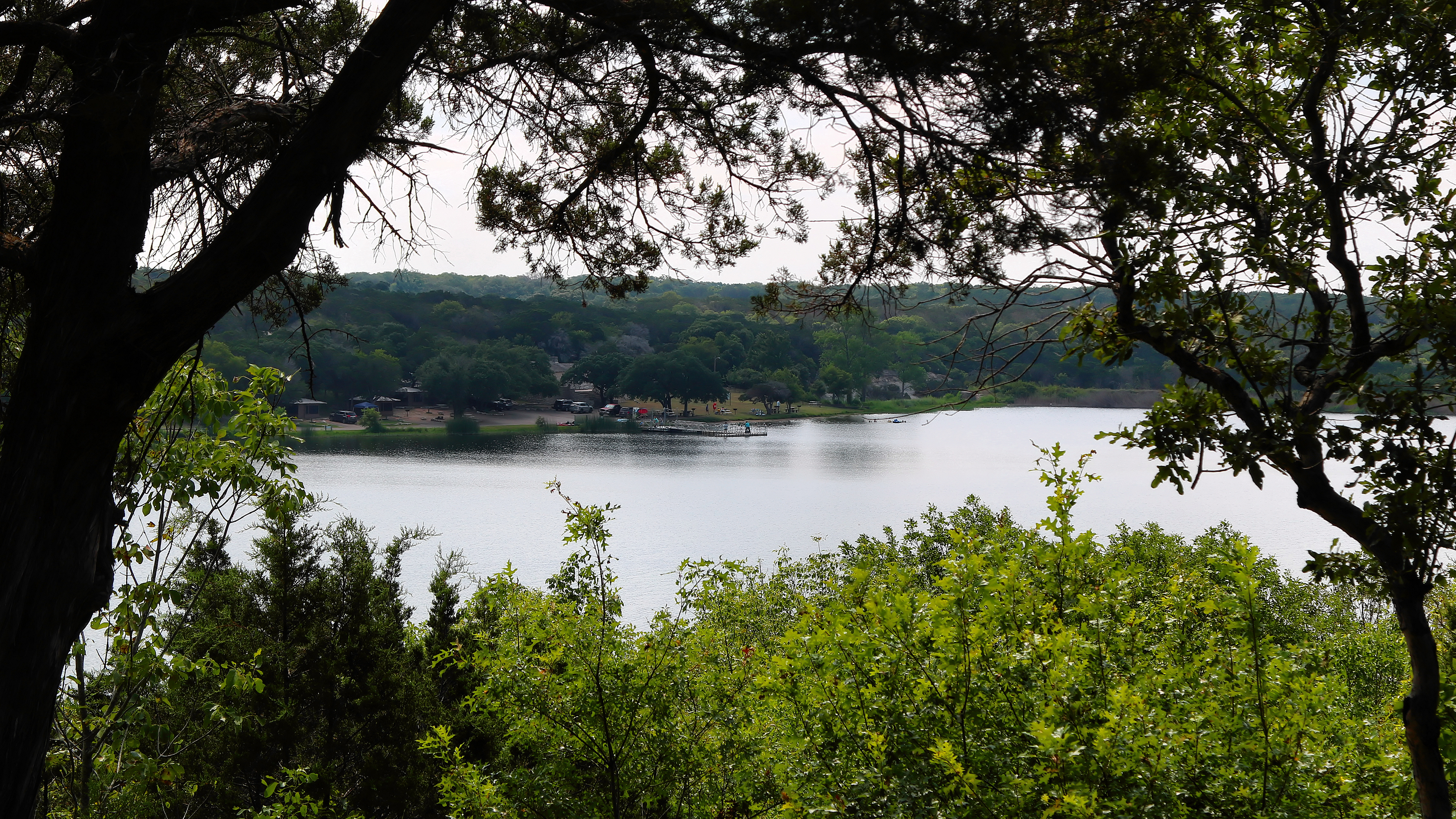
- Overlooking Meridian State Park

- Location within Texas Location within the United States
- Location: Bosque County, Texas
- Nearest city: Meridian, Texas
- Coordinates: 31.890791°N 97.697566°W
- Area: 505.4 acres (204.5 ha)
- Elevation: 1,040 feet (320 m)
- Established: 1933
- Visitors: 41,199 (in 2025)
- Governing body: Texas Parks and Wildlife Department
- Owner: Texas Parks & Wildlife Department
- Website: Official site

Meridian State Park is a 505.4 acres (204.5 ha) state park in Bosque County, Texas, United States. The park opened in 1935 and is managed by the Texas Parks and Wildlife Department. The park is named for its proximity to the city of Meridian, Texas.

== History ==
The State of Texas acquired the land in 1933 from private owners. The park's facilities were constructed by the Civilian Conservation Corps (CCC). CCC Company 1827 developed the park using local materials of limestone and timber from National Park Service designs. The CCC constructed a rock and earthen dam across Bee Creek that impounds 72-acre Lake Meridian. Other infrastructure built at the time included the entrance portal, roads, water crossing, vehicle bridges, and culverts most of which are still in use.

== Recreation ==
The park has over 5 miles of hiking trails some with limestone ledges and outcroppings. There are opportunities for swimming, fishing, and paddling in Lake Meridian. There are various types of sites for camping, as well as screened shelters and three cabins.

== Nature ==
The park is located in a transitional zone between Texas Blackland Prairies and Cross Timbers ecoregions.

=== Animals ===
The park has a wide variety of wildlife such as white-tailed deer, Mexican long-nosed armadillo, common raccoon and gray fox. Among its bird species is the endangered golden-cheeked warbler, which nests in Ashe juniper trees during the summer. Fish species in the lake include bluegill, white crappie, channel catfish, and largemouth bass.

=== Plants ===
The limestone soils of the area support not only Ashe juniper but Buckley's oak, Texas live oak, prickly pear cactus, and pale yucca. The predominant grasses are little bluestem, Indian grass, and river oats.

== See also ==
- List of Texas state parks
