= San Jacinto Monument =

Masonry column in Harris County, Texas, U.S.

- San Jacinto Battlefield
- U.S. National Historic Landmark District – Contributing property
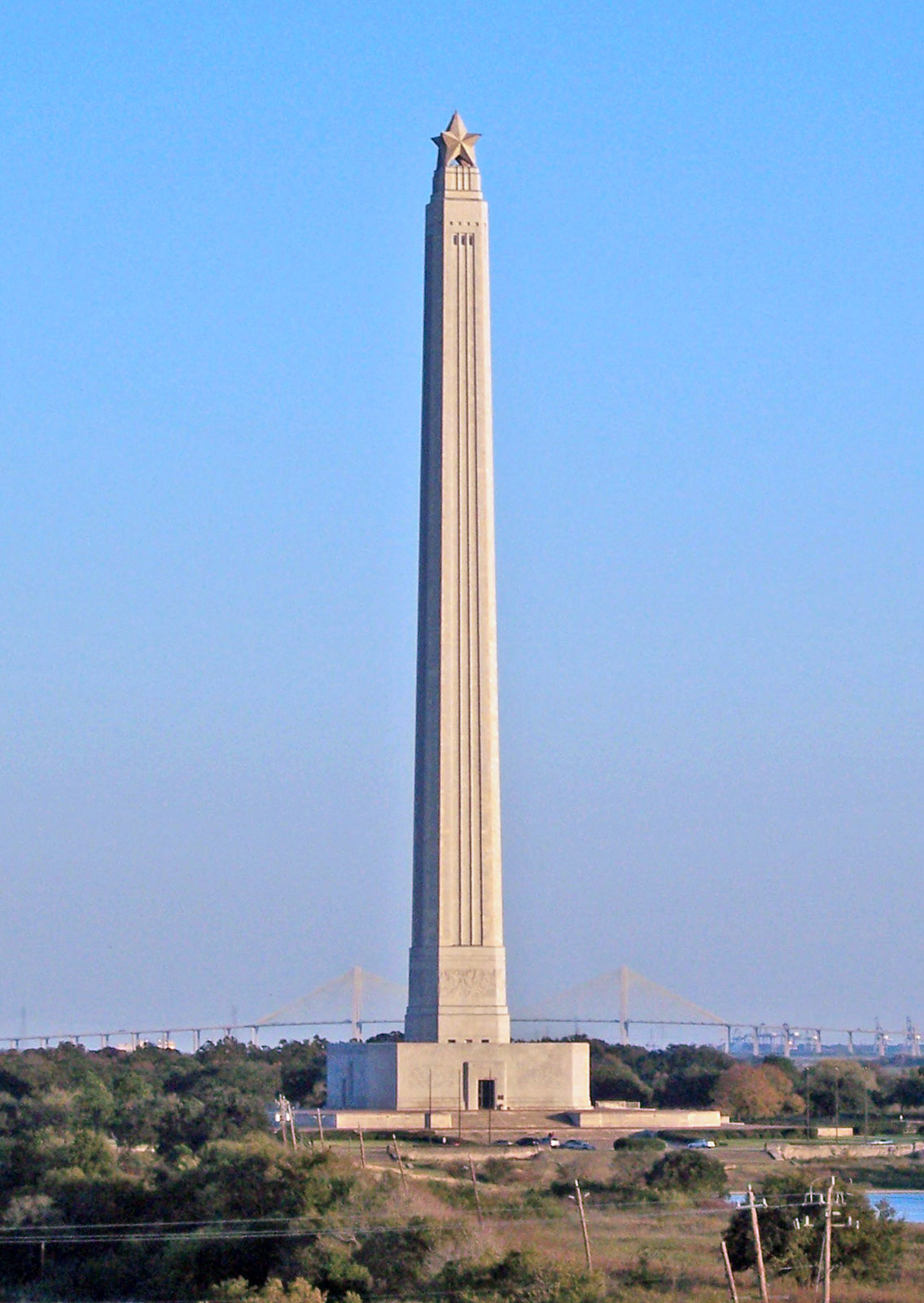
- The San Jacinto Monument in 2007

- Location within Texas
- Location: Harris County, Texas, U.S.
- Nearest city: Deer Park, Texas, U.S.
- Coordinates: 29°45′00″N 95°04′51″W
- Area: 455 acres (184 ha)
- Built: 1939
- Part of: San Jacinto Battlefield (ID66000815)
- Designated NHLDCP: October 15, 1966

The San Jacinto Monument is a 567.31-foot-high (172.92-meter) (Note: Measured in 1991 from its footing to the top of its beacon. The footing is 1.41 ft (0.43 m) below the top of the roadway pavement and the top of the beacon is 3.61 feet (1.10 m) above the top of the star.) column located on the Houston Ship Channel in unincorporated Harris County, Texas, about 16 miles (26 km) due east of Downtown Houston. The octagonal Art Deco spire is topped with a 34-foot (10 m), 220-ton Lone Star – the symbol of Texas. The memorial commemorates the site of the Battle of San Jacinto, the decisive engagement of the Texas Revolution.

Part of the San Jacinto Battleground State Historic Site, it was constructed between 1936 and 1939 and dedicated on April 21, 1939. The world's tallest masonry column, it is 12 feet taller than the 554.612-foot (169.046 m) tall Washington Monument, making it the tallest stone monument in the world. Visitors can take an elevator to the monument's observation deck for a view of Houston and the San Jacinto battlefield.

The San Jacinto Museum of History is located inside the base of the monument and focuses on the history of the Battle of San Jacinto and Texas culture and heritage. The San Jacinto Battlefield, of which the monument is a part, was designated a National Historic Landmark on December 19, 1960, and is therefore also automatically listed on the National Register of Historic Places. It was designated a Historic Civil Engineering Landmark in 1992.

== History ==
In 1856, the Texas Veterans Association began lobbying the state legislature to create a memorial to the men who died during the Texas Revolution. The legislature commemorated the final battle of the revolution in the 1890s, when funds were appropriated to purchase the land where the battle took place. After a careful survey to determine the boundaries of the original battle site, land was purchased for a new state park east of Houston, in 1897. This became San Jacinto Battleground State Historic Site.

The Daughters of the Republic of Texas began pressuring the legislature to provide an official monument at the site of the Battle of San Jacinto. The chairman of the Texas Centennial Celebrations, Jesse H. Jones, provided an idea for a monument to memorialize all Texans who served during the Texas Revolution. Architect Alfred C. Finn provided the final design, in conjunction with engineer Robert J. Cummins. In March 1936, as part of the Texas Centennial Celebration, ground was broken for the San Jacinto Monument. Construction began on April 21, 1936, the centennial anniversary date of the Battle of San Jacinto. The cornerstone was set one year later on April 21, 1937, and two years later construction ended, also on the anniversary date, April 21, 1939. Jesse H. Jones was in attendance along with the commencement ceremony in 1939 when he and Sam Houston's last surviving son, Andrew Jackson Houston, and others officially dedicated the monument. The project was completed in exactly three years costing $1.5 million. The funds were provided by both the Texas legislature and the United States Congress.

From its opening, the monument has been run by the nonprofit association, the San Jacinto Museum of History Association. In 1966, the monument was placed under the control of the Texas Parks and Wildlife Department. The Parks Department allows the history association to continue its oversight of the monument.

The monument was renovated in 1983. In 1990, the base of the monument was redone to contain the San Jacinto Museum of History and the Jesse H. Jones Theatre for Texas Studies. The exterior of the monument underwent a further renovation in 1995, and the entire structure was renovated from 2004 through 2006.

== Description ==
The San Jacinto monument is an eight-sided tapering spire, square in cross-section with chamfered corners. At the point where the shaft rises from the base, it is 48 feet (15 m) square (2,304 square feet (214.0 m^{2})). The shaft narrows to 30 feet (9.1 m) square (900 square feet (84 m^{2})) at the observation deck. At the top of the monument is a 220-ton, 34-foot (10 m) high star, representing the Lone Star of Texas. A 1,750-by-200-foot (533 by 61 m) reflecting pool shows the entire shaft.

The monument was built by W.S. Bellows Construction and primarily constructed of reinforced concrete. Its exterior is faced with Texas limestone from a quarry near the Texas State Capitol. It stands 567.31 feet (172.92 m) tall and is the tallest monument column in the world. It is 9.6 feet (2.9 m) taller than the next tallest, the Juche Tower in North Korea.

The base of the monument contains a 15,625-square-foot (1,451.6 m^{2}) museum and a 160-seat theater. The base is decorated with eight engraved panels depicting the history of Texas. The bronze doors which allow entry into the museum show the six flags of Texas.

As of 2006, approximately 250,000 people visited the monument each year, including 40,000 children on school trips.

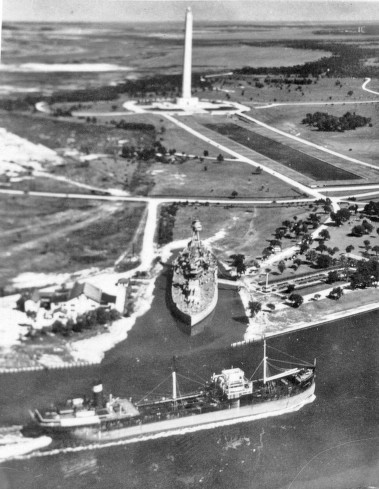
Aerial View San Jacinto Monument (1950s)

== Inscription ==
An inscription on The base of the monument tells the story of the birth of Texas:

The early policies of Mexico toward her Texas colonists had been extremely liberal. Large grants of land were made to them, and no taxes or duties imposed. The relationship between the Anglo-Americans and Mexicans was cordial. But, following a series of revolutions begun in 1829, unscrupulous rulers successively seized power in Mexico. Their unjust acts and despotic decrees led to the revolution in Texas.

In June, 1832, the colonists forced the Mexican authorities at Anahuac to release Wm. B. Travis and others from unjust imprisonment. The Battle of Velasco, June 26, and the Battle of Nacogdoches, August 2, followed; in both the Texans were victorious. Stephen Fuller Austin, "Father of Texas", was arrested January 3, 1834, and held in Mexico without trial until July, 1835. The Texans formed an army, and on November 12, 1835, established a provisional government.

The first shot of the Revolution of 1835-36 was fired by the Texans at Gonzales, October 2, 1835, in resistance to a demand by Mexican soldiers for a small cannon held by the colonists. The Mexican garrison at Goliad fell October 9; the Battle of Concepcion was won by the Texans, October 28. San Antonio was captured December 10, 1835 after five days of fighting in which the indomitable Benjamin R. Milam died a hero, and the Mexican Army evacuated Texas.

Texas declared her independence at Washington-on-the-Brazos March 2. For nearly two months her armies met disaster and defeat: Dr. James Grant's men were killed on the Aguadulce March 2; William Barret Travis and his men sacrificed their lives at the Alamo, March 6; William Ward was defeated at Refugio, March 14; Amos B. King's men were executed near Refugio, March 16; and James Walker Fannin and his army were put to death near Goliad March 27, 1836.

On this field on April 21, 1836 the Army of Texas commanded by General Sam Houston, and accompanied by the Secretary of War, Thomas J. Rusk, attacked the larger invading army of Mexicans under General Santa Anna. The battle line from left to right was formed by Sidney Sherman's regiment, Edward Burleson's regiment, the artillery commanded by George W. Hockley, Henry Millard's infantry and the cavalry under Mirabeau B. Lamar. Sam Houston led the infantry charge.

With the battle cry, "Remember the Alamo! Remember Goliad!" the Texans charged. The enemy, taken by surprise, rallied for a few minutes then fled in disorder. The Texans had asked no quarter and gave none. The slaughter was appalling, victory complete, and Texas free! On the following day General Antonio Lopez De Santa Anna, self-styled "Napoleon of the West", received from a generous foe the mercy he had denied Travis at the Alamo and Fannin at Goliad.

Citizens of Texas and immigrant soldiers in the Army of Texas at San Jacinto were natives of Alabama, Arkansas, Connecticut, Georgia, Illinois, Indiana, Kentucky, Louisiana, Maine, Maryland, Massachusetts, Michigan, Mississippi, Missouri, New Hampshire, New York, North Carolina, Ohio, Pennsylvania, Rhode Island, South Carolina, Tennessee, Texas, Vermont, Virginia, Austria, Canada, England, France, Germany, Ireland, Italy, Mexico, Poland, Portugal and Scotland.

Measured by its results, San Jacinto was one of the decisive battles of the world. The freedom of Texas from Mexico won here led to annexation and to the Mexican–American War, resulting in the acquisition by the United States of the states of Texas, New Mexico, Arizona, Nevada, California, Utah and parts of Colorado, Wyoming, Kansas and Oklahoma. Almost one-third of the present area of the American Nation, nearly a million square miles of territory, changed sovereignty.

== Gallery ==
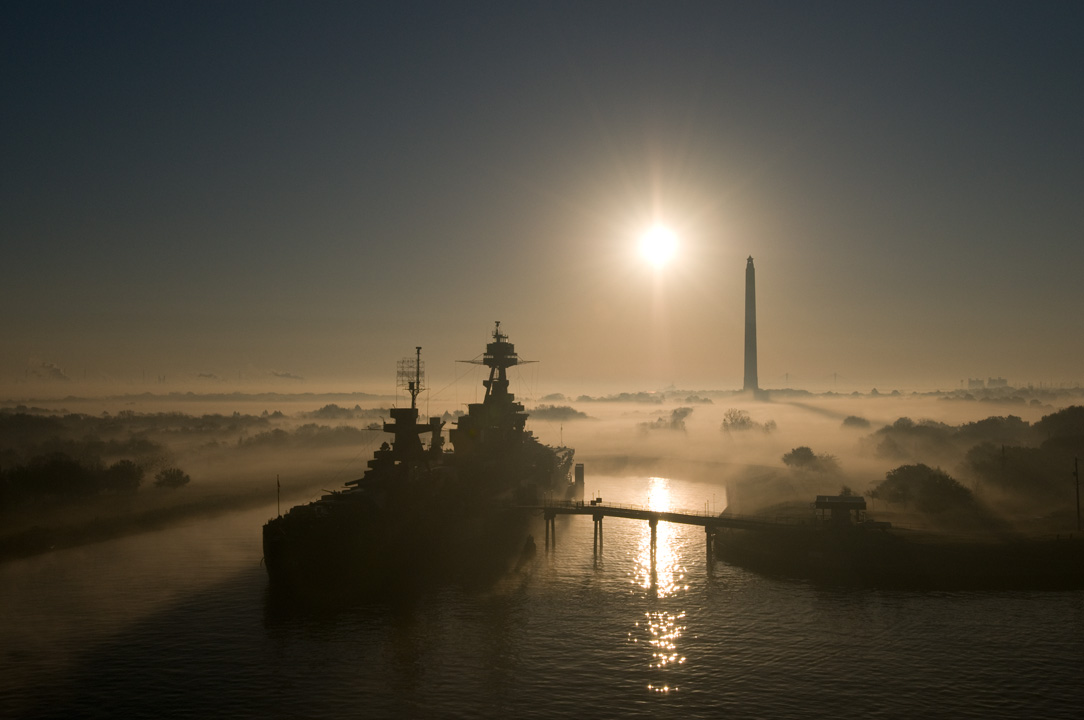
USS Texas and the Monument seen at sunrise in late 2007

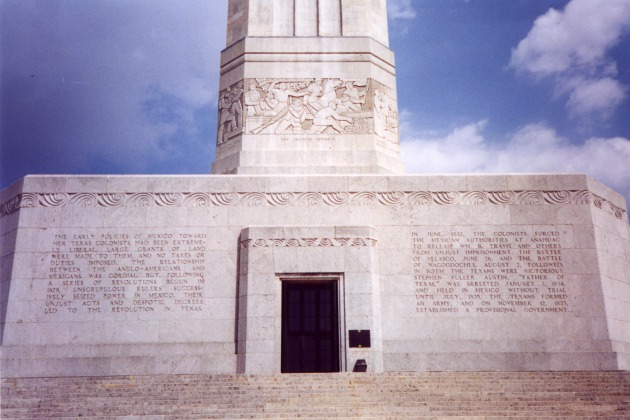
The base of the monument

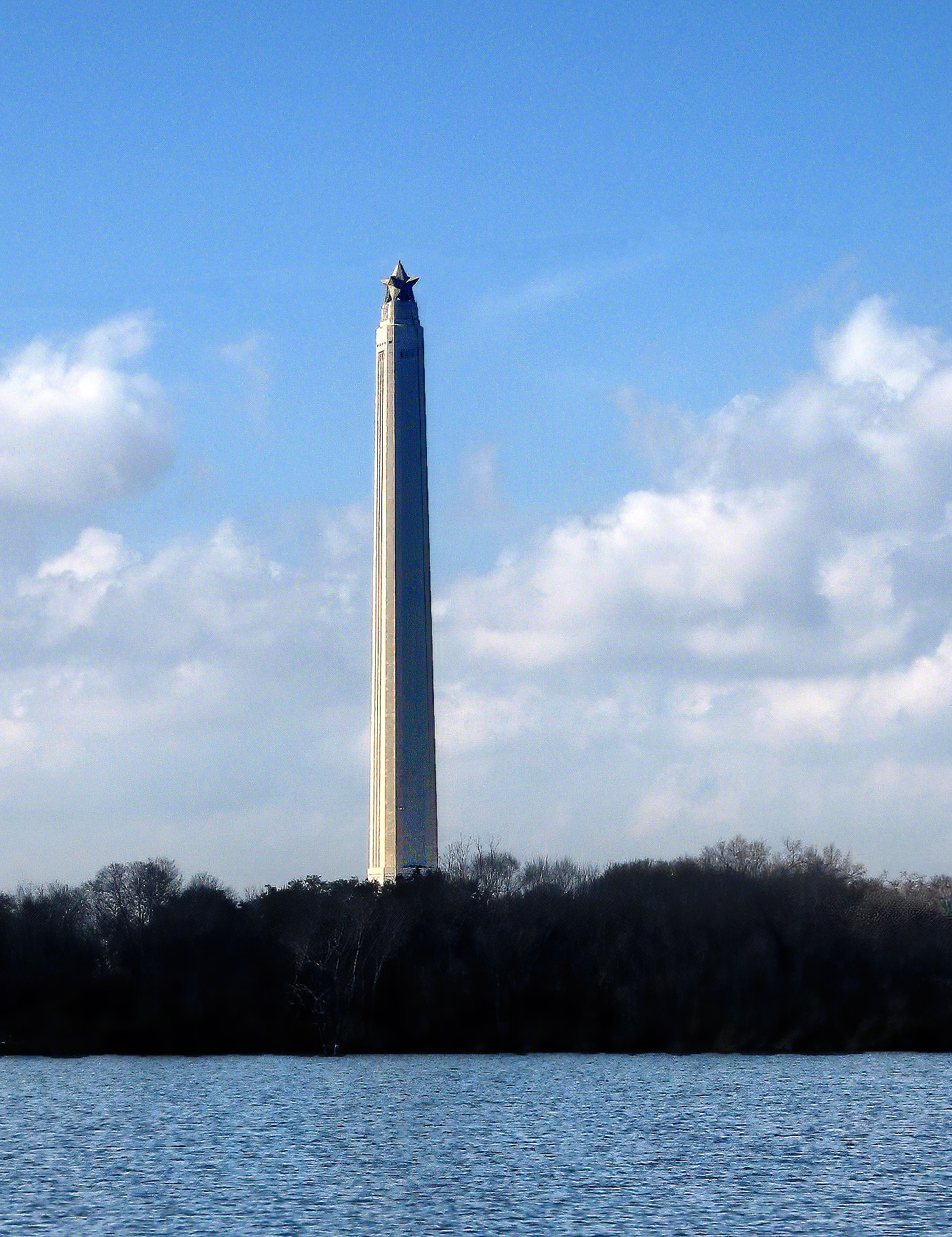
The spire seen from the shipping canal

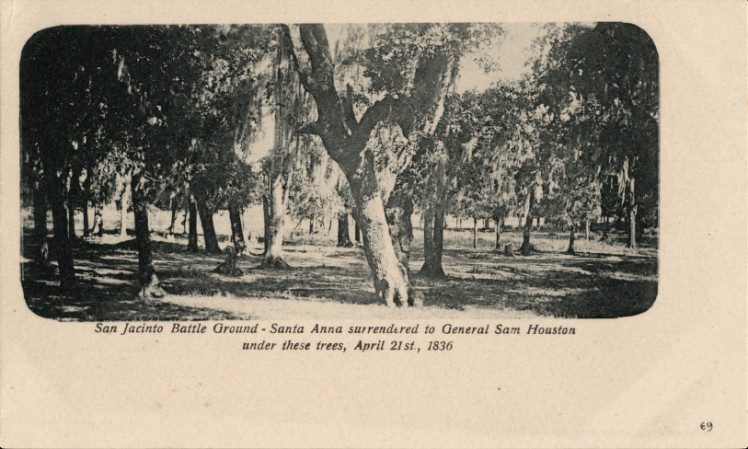
San Jacinto Battle Ground (postcard, c. 1898)

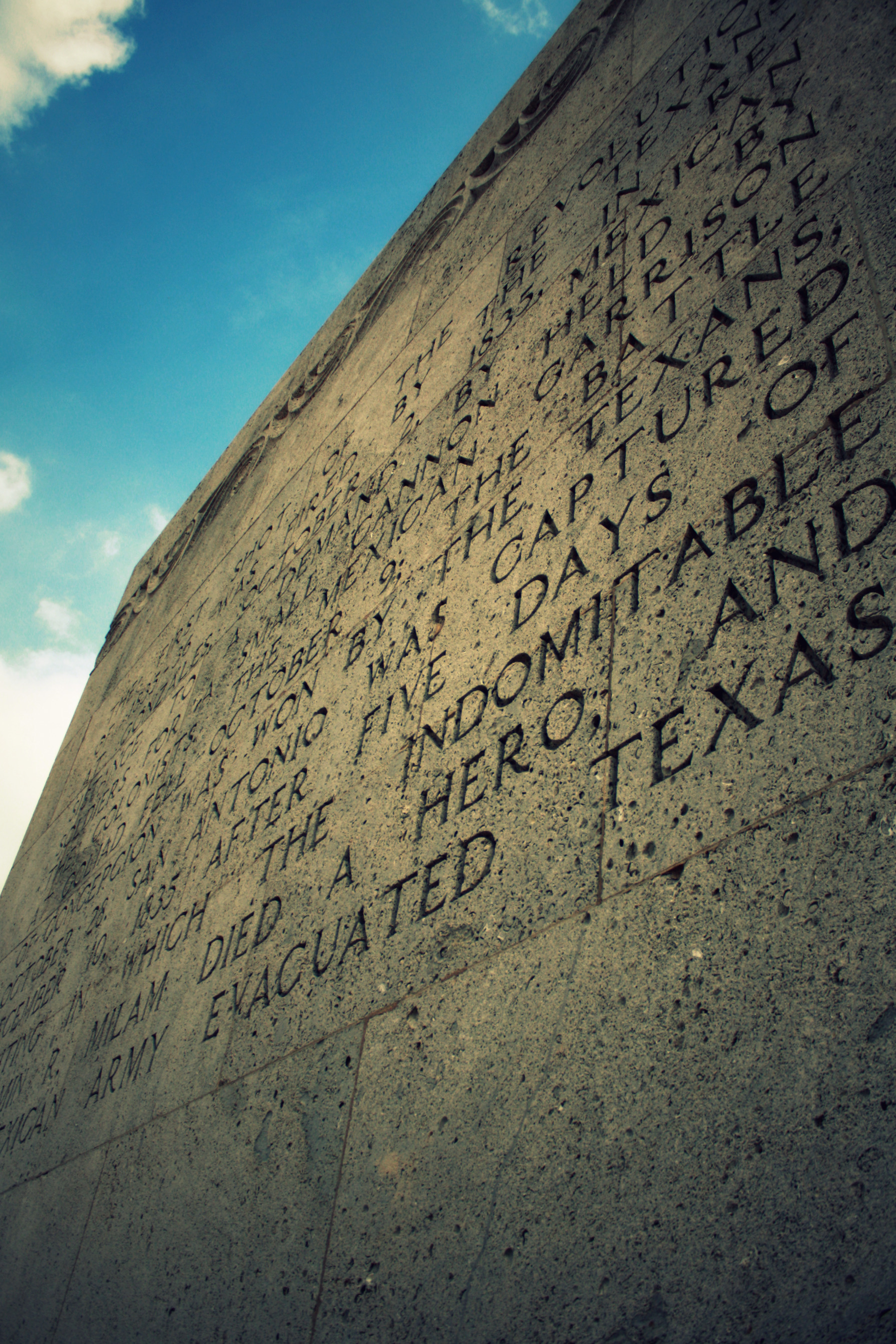
Engraved panel depicting the history of Texas on the San Jacinto Monument

== See also ==
- San Jacinto Battleground State Historic Site
- San Jacinto Day
- Bibliography of the Texas Revolution, Republic, and Annexation
