= San Jacinto Battleground State Historic Site =

- San Jacinto Battlefield
- U.S. National Register of Historic Places
- U.S. National Historic Landmark
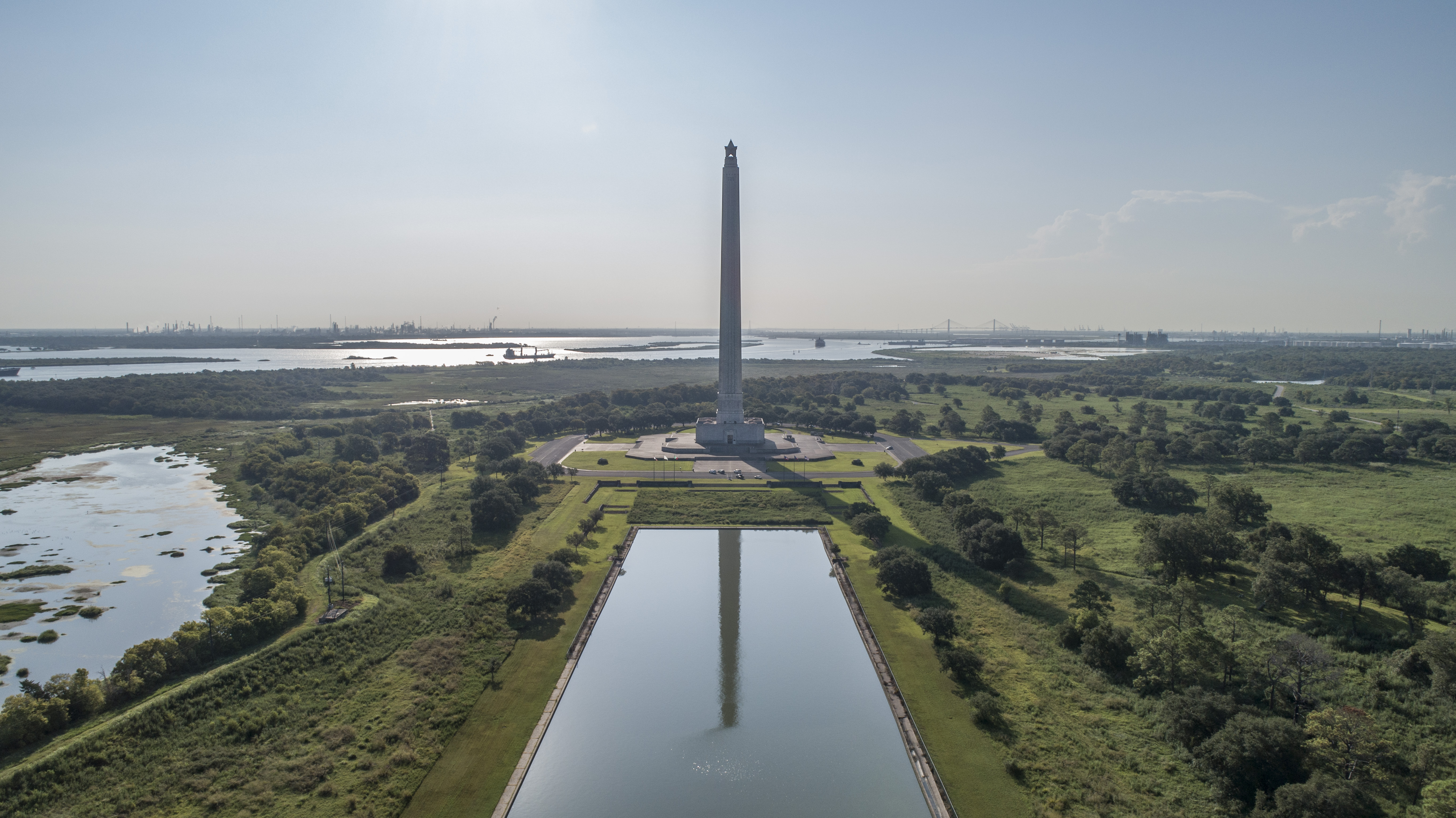
- The San Jacinto Monument and reflection pool at the San Jacinto Battleground

- Location within Texas Location within the United States
- Location: Harris County, Texas
- Nearest city: Houston
- Coordinates: 29°44′56″N 95°4′49″W
- Area: 1,200 acres (490 ha)
- Built: 1836
- NRHP reference No.: 66000815

Significant dates
- Added to NRHP: October 15, 1966
- Designated NHL: December 19, 1960

The San Jacinto Battleground State Historic Site includes the location of the Battle of San Jacinto. It is located off the Houston Ship Channel in Harris County, Texas. It is mostly in unincorporated area while parts are within the city limits of Houston. The site was designated a National Historic Landmark in 1960.

A prominent feature of the park is the San Jacinto Monument. Visitors can take an elevator to the monument's observation deck for a view of Houston, the Houston Ship Channel, and the San Jacinto battlefield.

== History ==
The beginnings of the San Jacinto Battleground State Historic site trace to the early 1880s, when the State of Texas purchased ten acres along Buffalo Bayou in preparation for the fiftieth anniversary of the Texas Revolution. The Daughters of the Republic of Texas (DRT) pressured the Texas Legislature for more appropriations for San Jacinto. In 1897, Texas State Senator Waller Thomas Burns of Houston helped to pass legislation to fund $10,000 to establish a public park. The money was used to purchase an additional 336 acres of land at San Jacinto. The state appropriated another $25,000 in 1907 for improvements at the battleground and officially named it San Jacinto State Park, the first official state park in Texas. A governor appointed local commission managed the park and reported to the State Board of Control. More state-assisted improvements came to the park in preparation for the 1928 Democratic National Convention in Houston. A grant from the U.S. Fish and Wildlife Service's Coastal Impact Assistance Program will be funding a $2.6 million construction project for improvements to the site's seawall, with an anticipated finish date of December 31, 2016.

== San Jacinto Museum ==
The San Jacinto Museum is located inside the base of the San Jacinto Monument. In addition to the Battle of San Jacinto, the museum's exhibits focus on the history of Texan culture, including Mayan, Spanish and Mexican influences, the history of the Texas Revolution and the Republic of Texas, and important figures in Texas history.

The 160-seat Jesse H. Jones Theatre for Texas Studies presents a 35-minute movie titled Texas Forever!! The Battle of San Jacinto.

== Battleship Texas ==
On 17 April 1947, the Battleship Texas Commission was established by the Texas Legislature to care for the ship. The $225,000 necessary to pay for towing her from Baltimore to San Jacinto was the Commission's first task. On 17 March 1948, Texas began her journey to her new anchorage along the busy Houston Ship Channel near the San Jacinto Monument, at San Jacinto State Park, arriving on 20 April, where she was turned over to the State of Texas the next day to serve as a permanent memorial. Her name was struck from the Naval Vessel Register on 30 April 1948. The date of 21 April is significant in that it was the date of the decisive 1836 Battle of San Jacinto that ended the Texas Revolution and led to the creation of the Republic of Texas, which joined the US as a state in 1845. Texas was the first battleship memorial museum in the US. When the battleship was presented to the State of Texas, she was commissioned as the flagship of the Texas Navy. On 31 August 2022, Texas was towed from her berth at San Jacinto to Gulf Copper Dry Dock & Rig Repair in Galveston for extensive repairs. Her new permanent home will be in Galveston.

== Subsidence ==
Underground water has led to severe land subsidence and erosion along the Bay Area shoreline, especially in the Baytown-Pasadena area. Since the beginning of the 20th century approximately 100 acres (40 ha) of the battleground have become submerged under the bay.

== Gallery ==
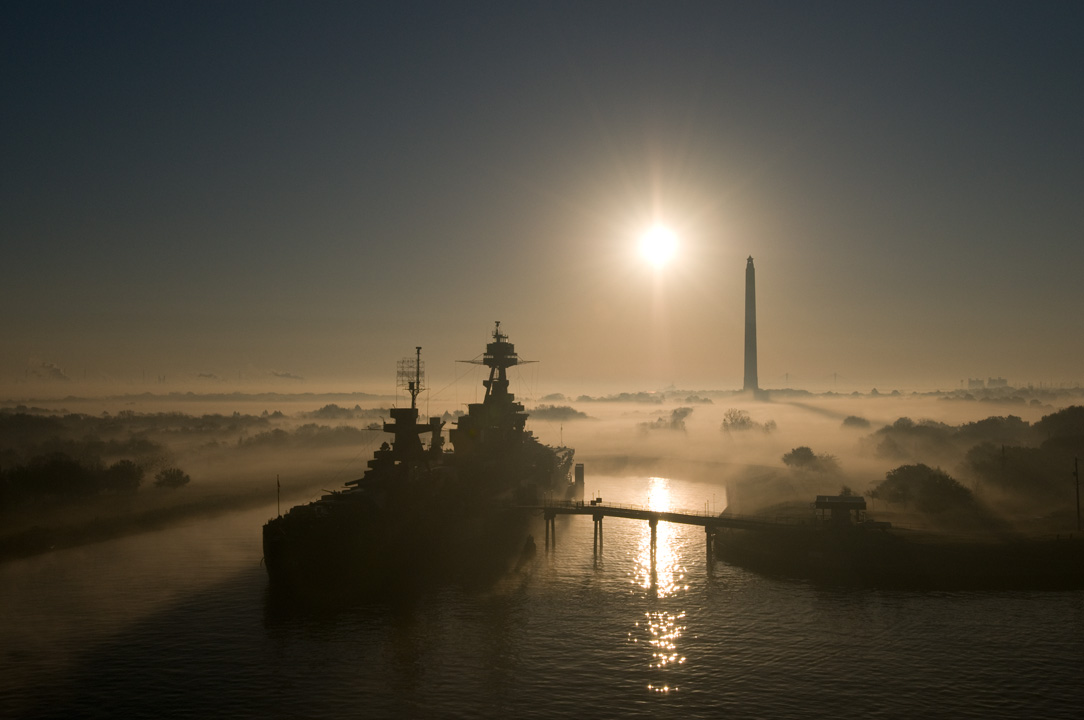
Texas and the monument at sunrise in late 2007.

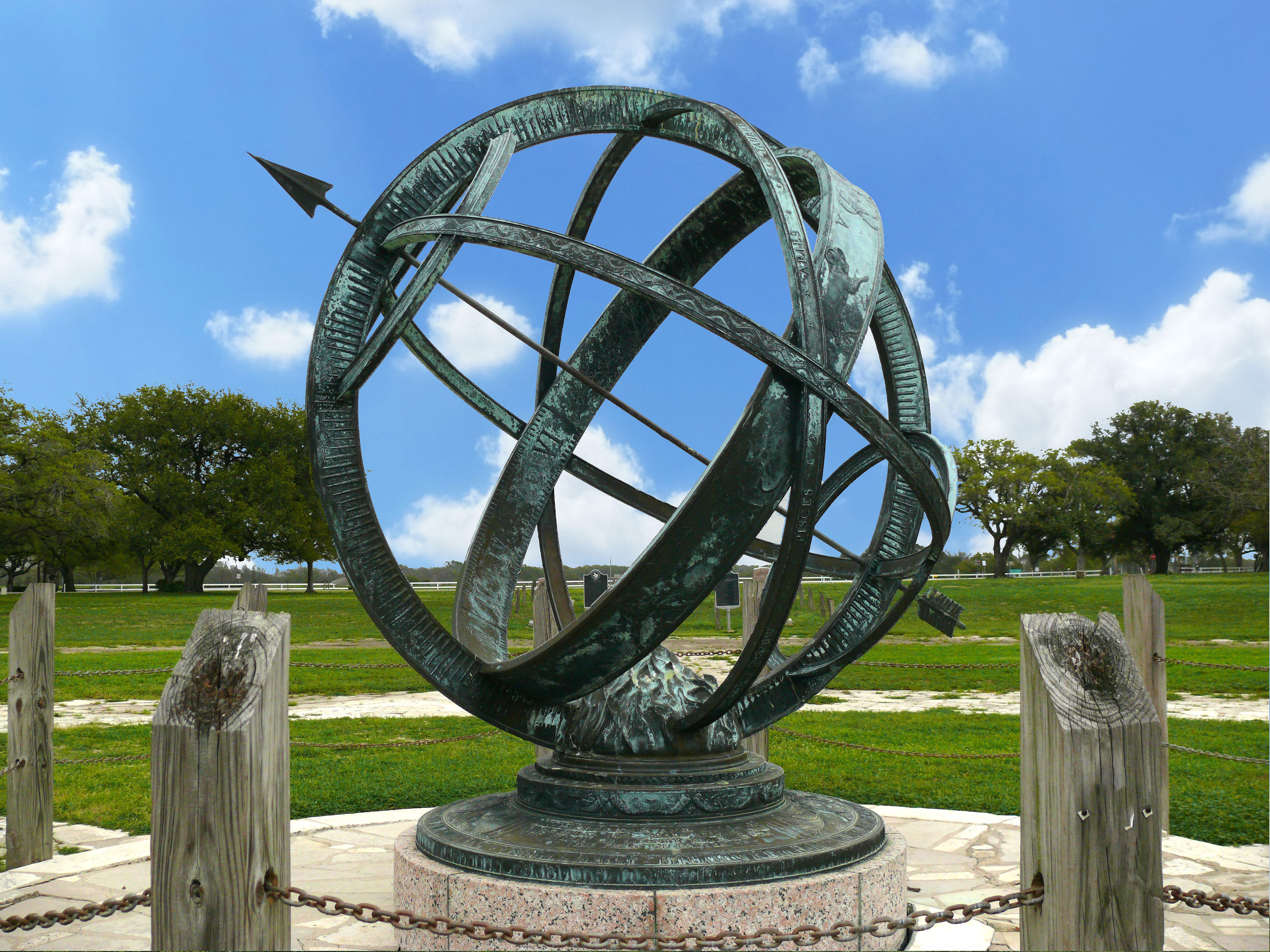
6' Armillary Sphere at the San Jacinto Battle Field

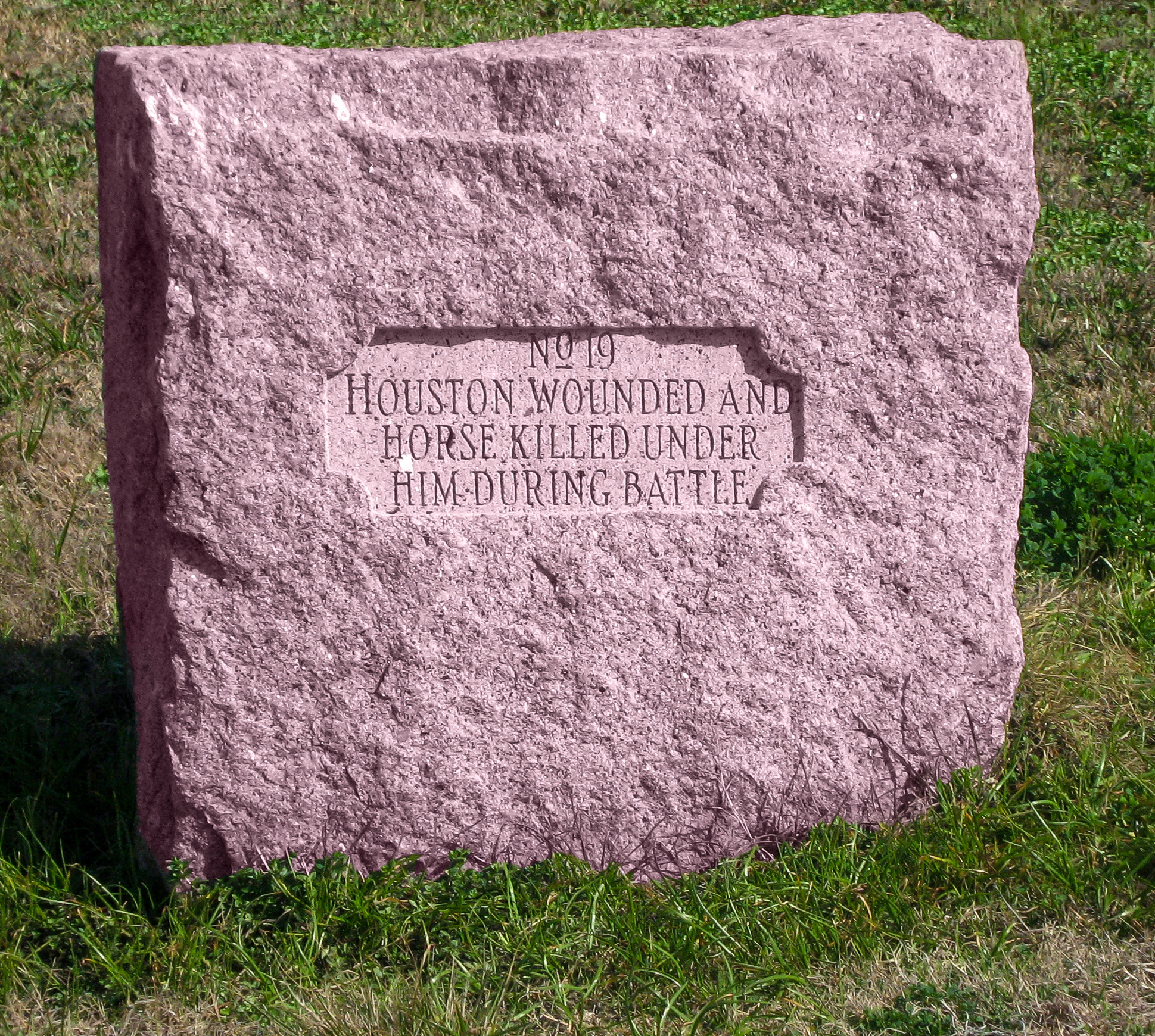
Granite Marker where Houston's horse was wounded and killed

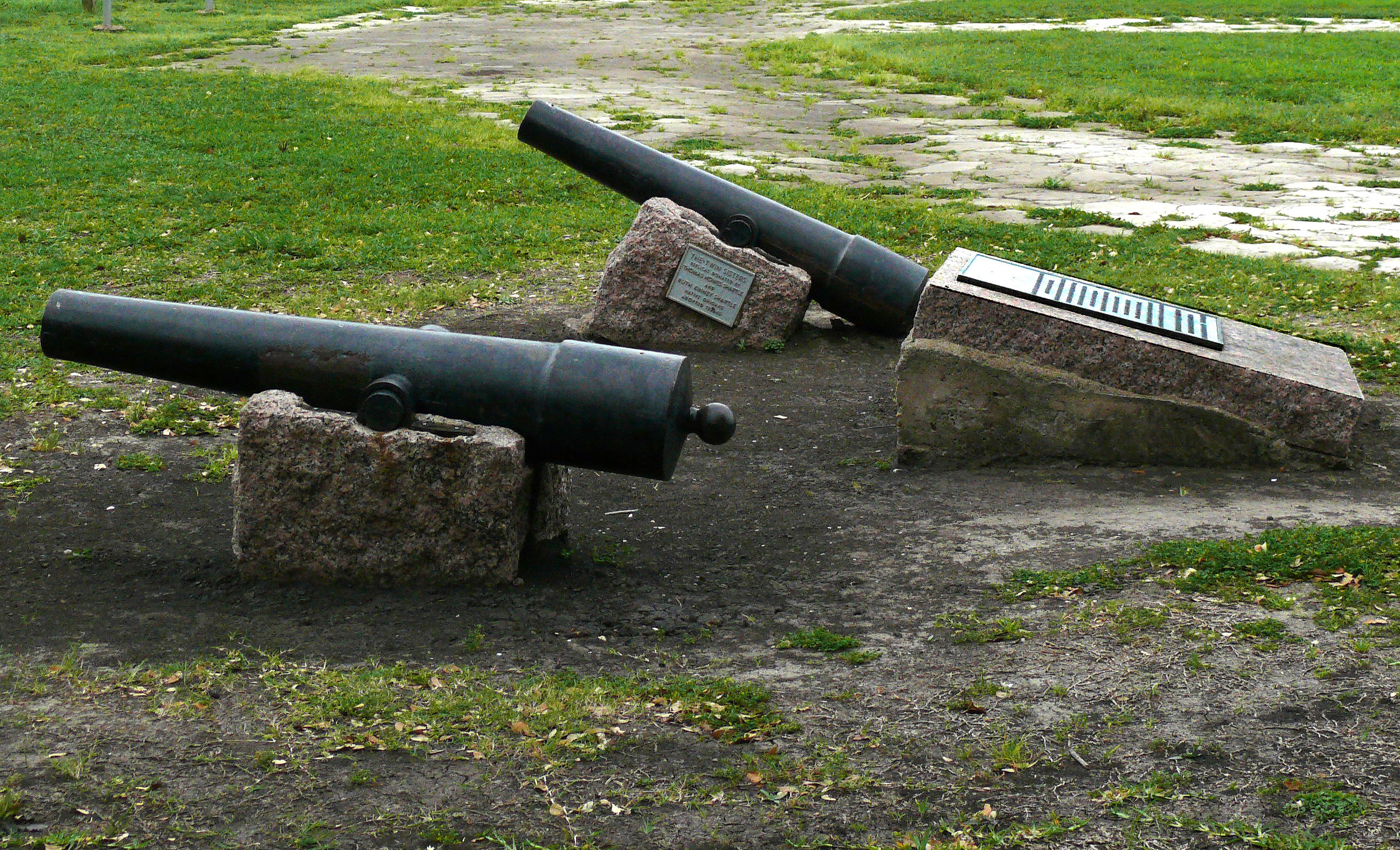
Replicas of the Twin Sisters cannons

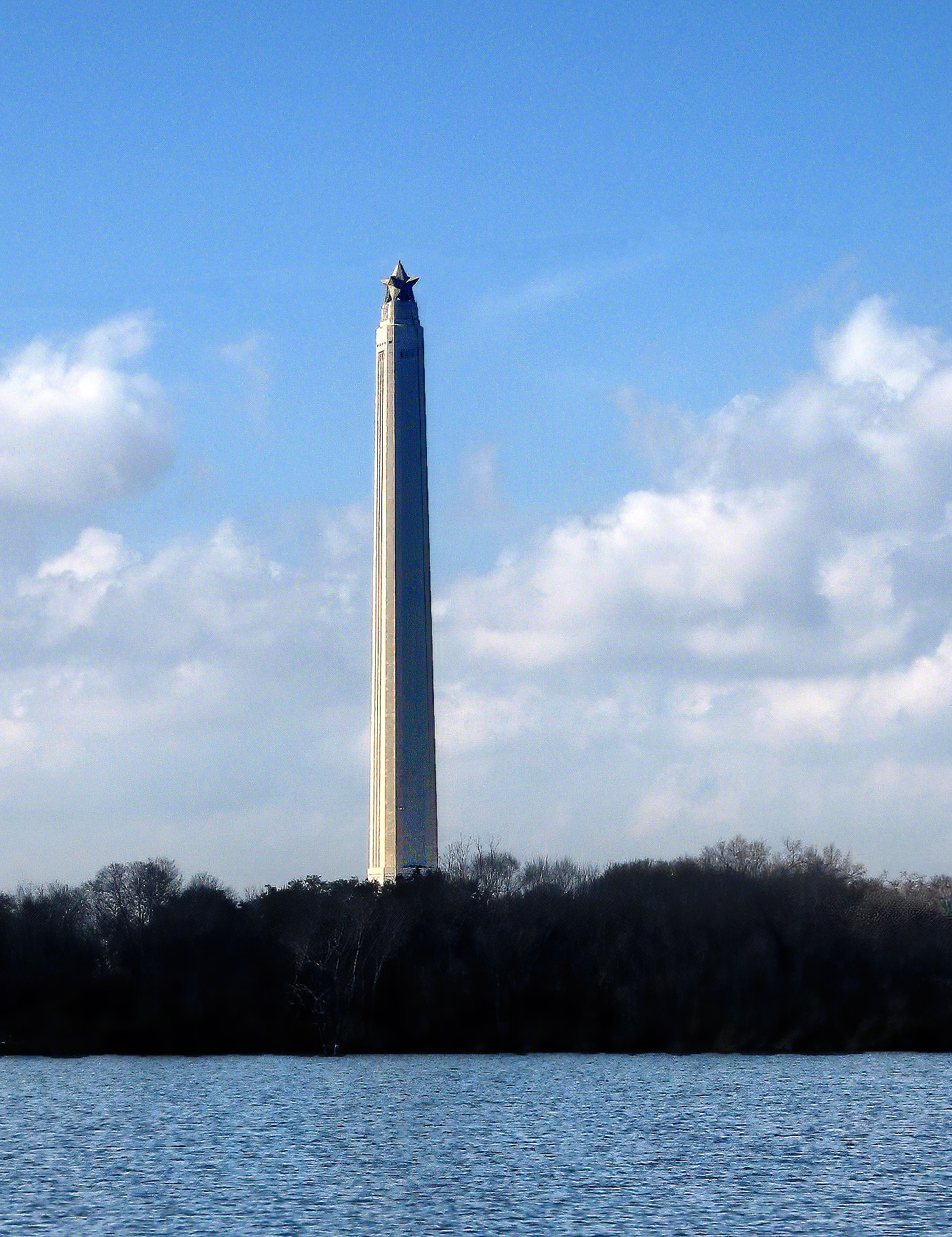
San Jacinto Monument

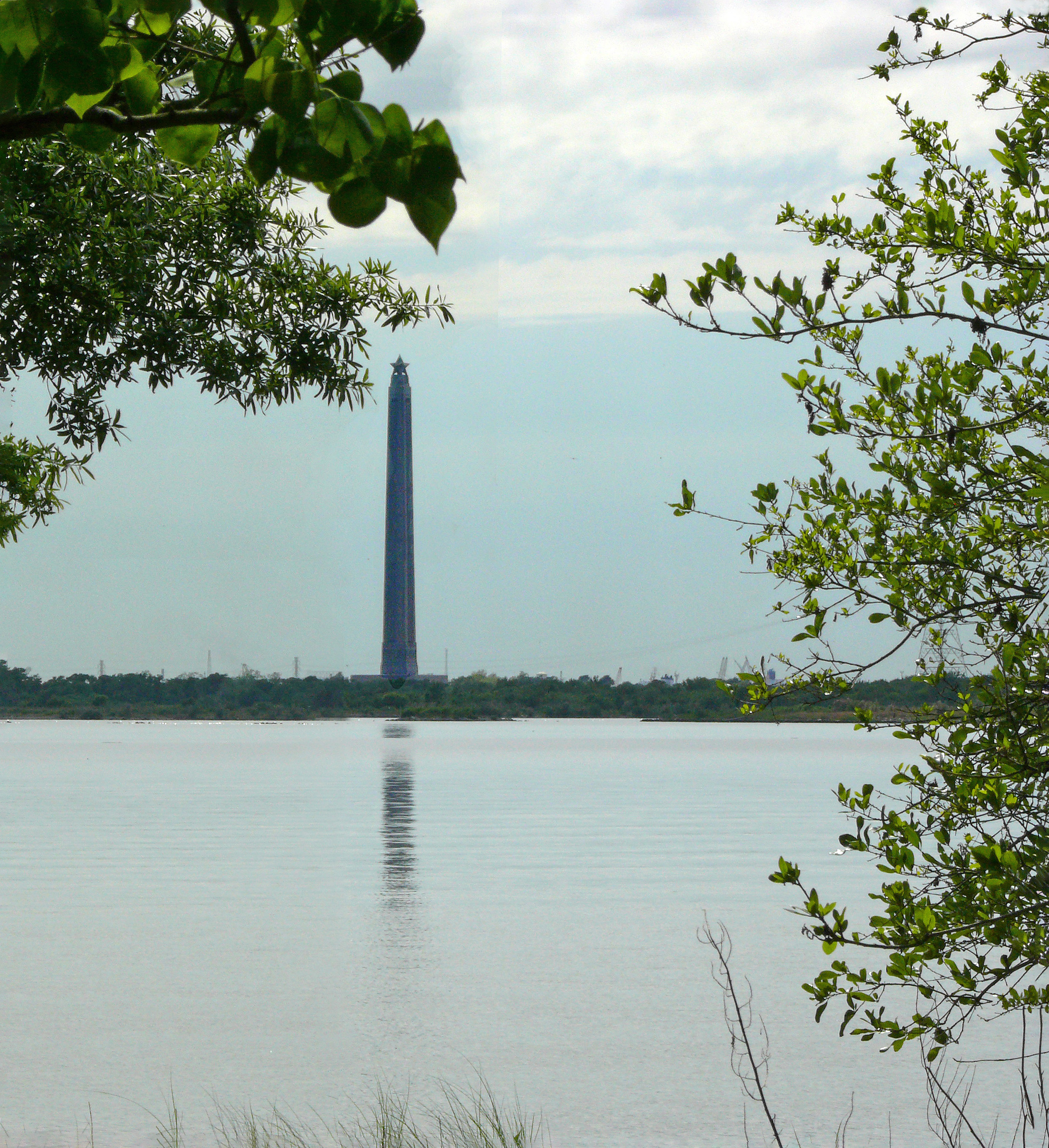
San Jacinto Monument from water's edge of the Baytown Nature Center

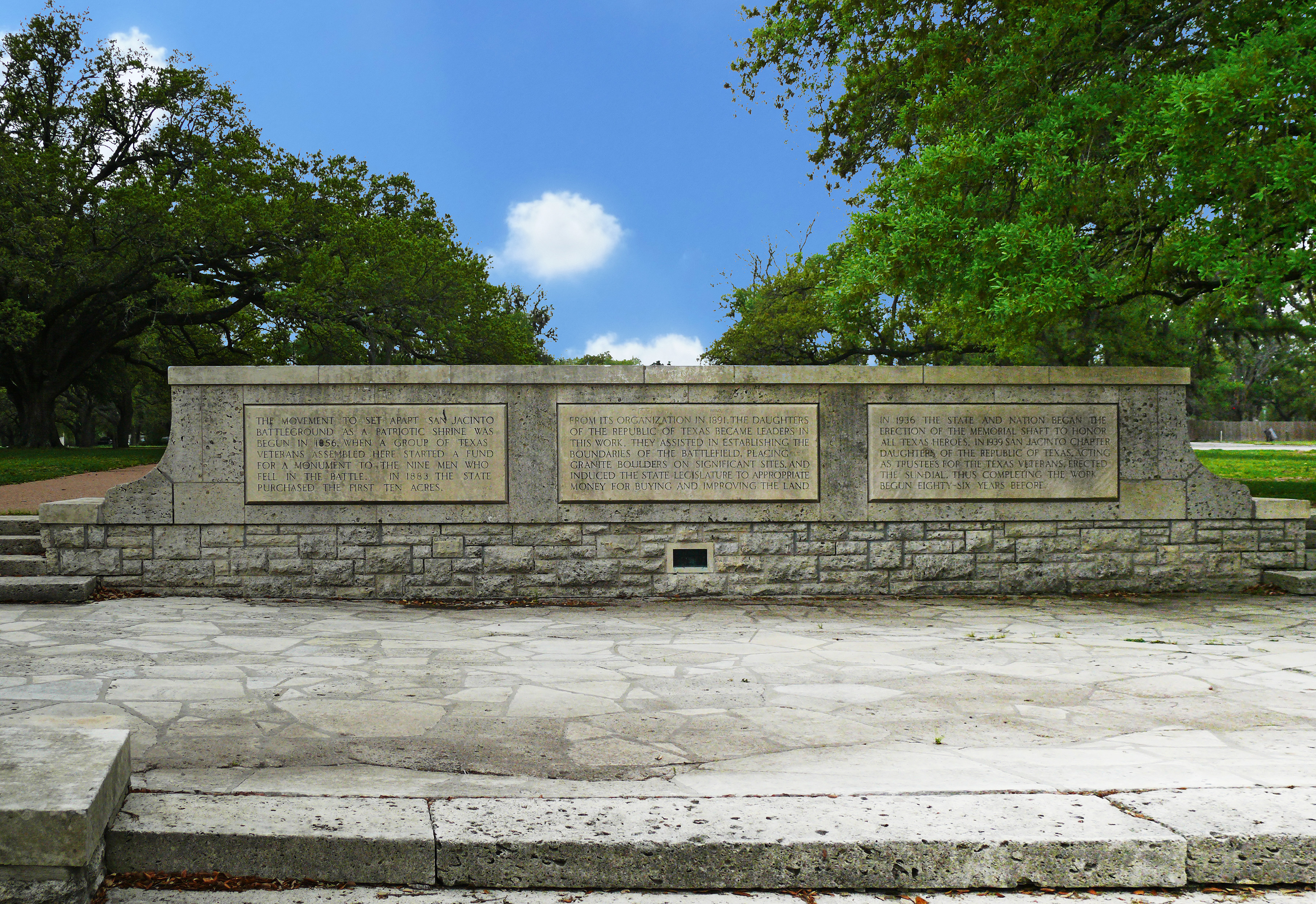
History of the Creation of San Jacinto Battle Ground Park
