= Thomas Jefferson Green =

American politician

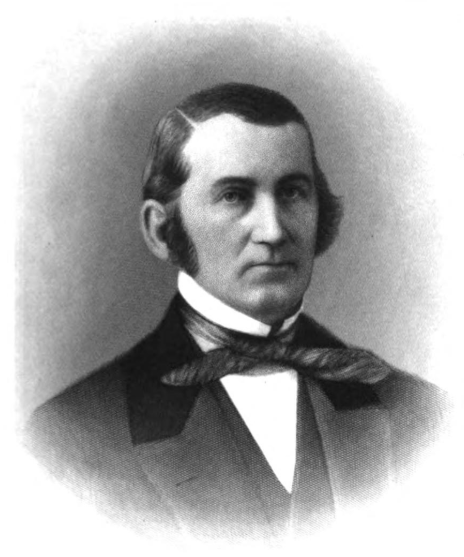
- Born: February 14, 1802; Warren County, North Carolina
- Died: December 12, 1863 (aged 61); Warren County, North Carolina
- Occupation: Politician
- Children: Wharton Jackson Green

Thomas Jefferson Green (February 14, 1802 – December 12, 1863) was an American politician who served in the legislatures of three different U.S. states and also of Texas, which was not yet a state.

== Biography ==
Born in Warren County, North Carolina in 1802, Green served in the North Carolina Legislature in 1823, then moved to Florida and served in the Florida Legislature and next moved to Texas in 1836. On March 19, he was commissioned as a brigadier general in the Texas volunteer army. To achieve this rank, he had to raise and transport a brigade of soldiers to Texas and secure a loan of $50,000 in support the Texas Revolution.

After the revolution, Green served in both houses of the Congress of the Texas Republic. His first term in Texas began on October 3, 1836, when Green represented Bexar County in the First Texas Congress. He was elected to represent Brazoria County in the Eighth Texas Congress.

In the early 1840s, Thomas J. Green was a member of the Somervell Expedition and was second in command during the ill-fated Mier Expedition. These were military ventures into Mexico, to attack Mexicans.

Green left Texas just before it was annexed to the United States. He moved to California during the gold rush and was elected to the first California Senate in 1850. He enlisted fifteen enslaved people he owned to help him mine gold, despite California being a free state. This led to him and the enslaved people being ousted from the diggings at Rose's Bar on the Yuba River because he made mining claims in the names of his enslaved people. This is one of few clear instances of enslaved labor not being allowed in the mines. He also sponsored the bill which created the University of California and became a major general in the California militia. Green also sponsored a bill that taxed Mexican immigrant miners in hopes of excluding them entirely from the industry. Green said of Mexican immigrants, "these people irredeemably lost to all social equality or national advantage."

Finally, Green returned to his native North Carolina, where he died in 1863.

The city of Greenville, Texas is named after him.

He was the father of Wharton Jackson Green. His great uncle was Nathaniel Macon.
