= Vehicle frame =

Main supporting structure of a motor vehicle

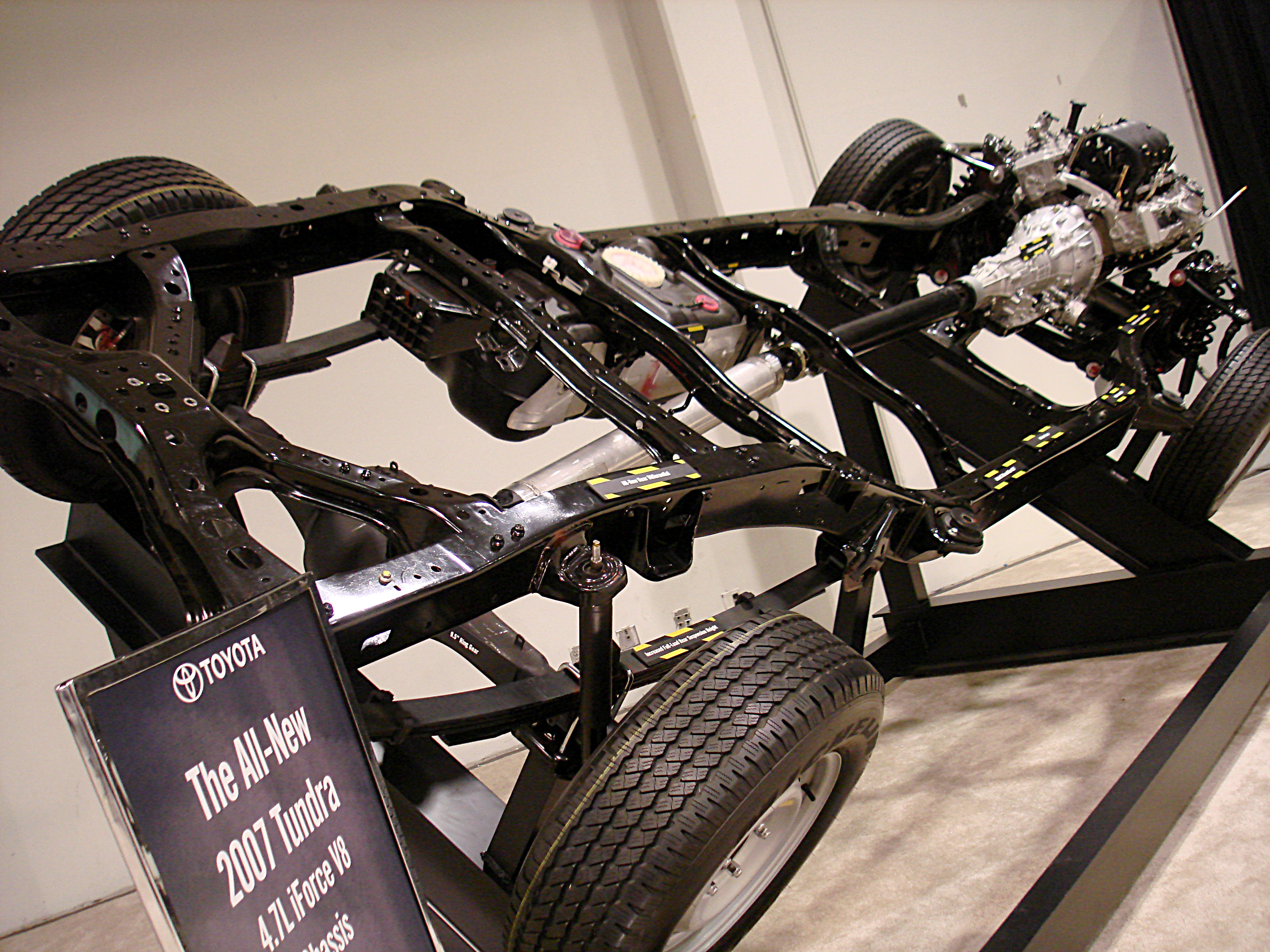
Ladder frame pickup truck chassis holds the vehicle's engine, drivetrain, suspension, and wheels

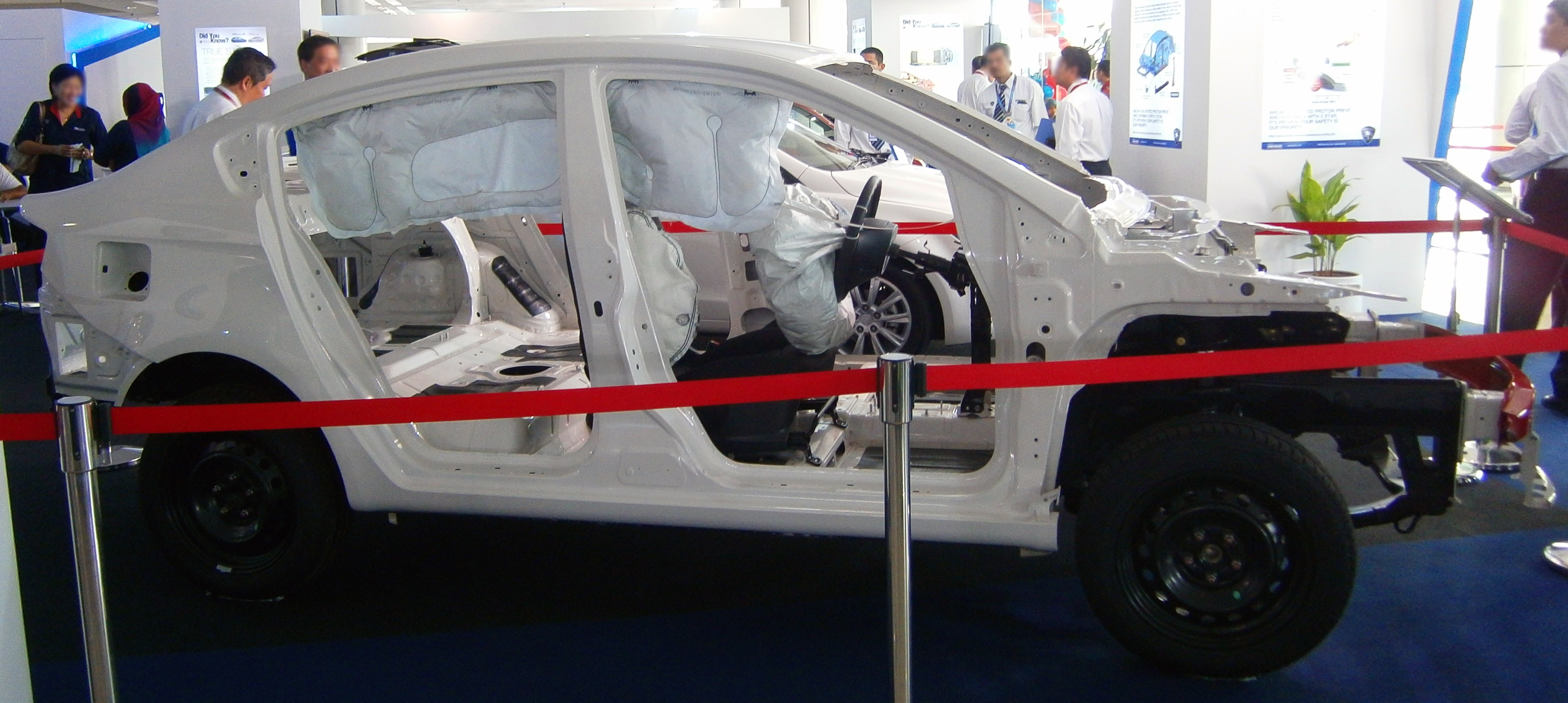
The unibody - for the unitized body - is also a form of a frame

A vehicle frame, also historically known as its chassis, is the main supporting structure of a motor vehicle to which all other components are attached, comparable to the skeleton of an organism.

Until the 1930s, virtually every car had a structural frame separate from its body, known as body-on-frame construction. Both mass production of completed vehicles by a manufacturer using this method, epitomized by the Ford Model T, and supply of rolling chassis to coachbuilders for both mass production (as by Fisher Body in the United States) and to smaller firms (such as Hooper) for bespoke bodies and interiors was practiced.

By the 1960s, unibody construction in passenger cars had become common, and the trend towards building unibody passenger cars continued over the ensuing decades.

Nearly all trucks and buses, and most pickups continue to use a separate frame as their chassis.

== Functions ==
The main functions of a frame in a motor vehicle are:

1. To support the vehicle's mechanical components and body
2. To deal with static and dynamic loads without undue deflection or distortion

These include:

- Weight of the body, passengers, and cargo loads.
- Vertical and torsional twisting transmitted by going over uneven surfaces
- Transverse lateral forces caused by road conditions, side wind, and steering of the vehicle
- Torque from the engine and transmission
- Longitudinal tensile forces from starting and acceleration, as well as compression from braking
- Sudden impacts from collisions

== Frame rails ==
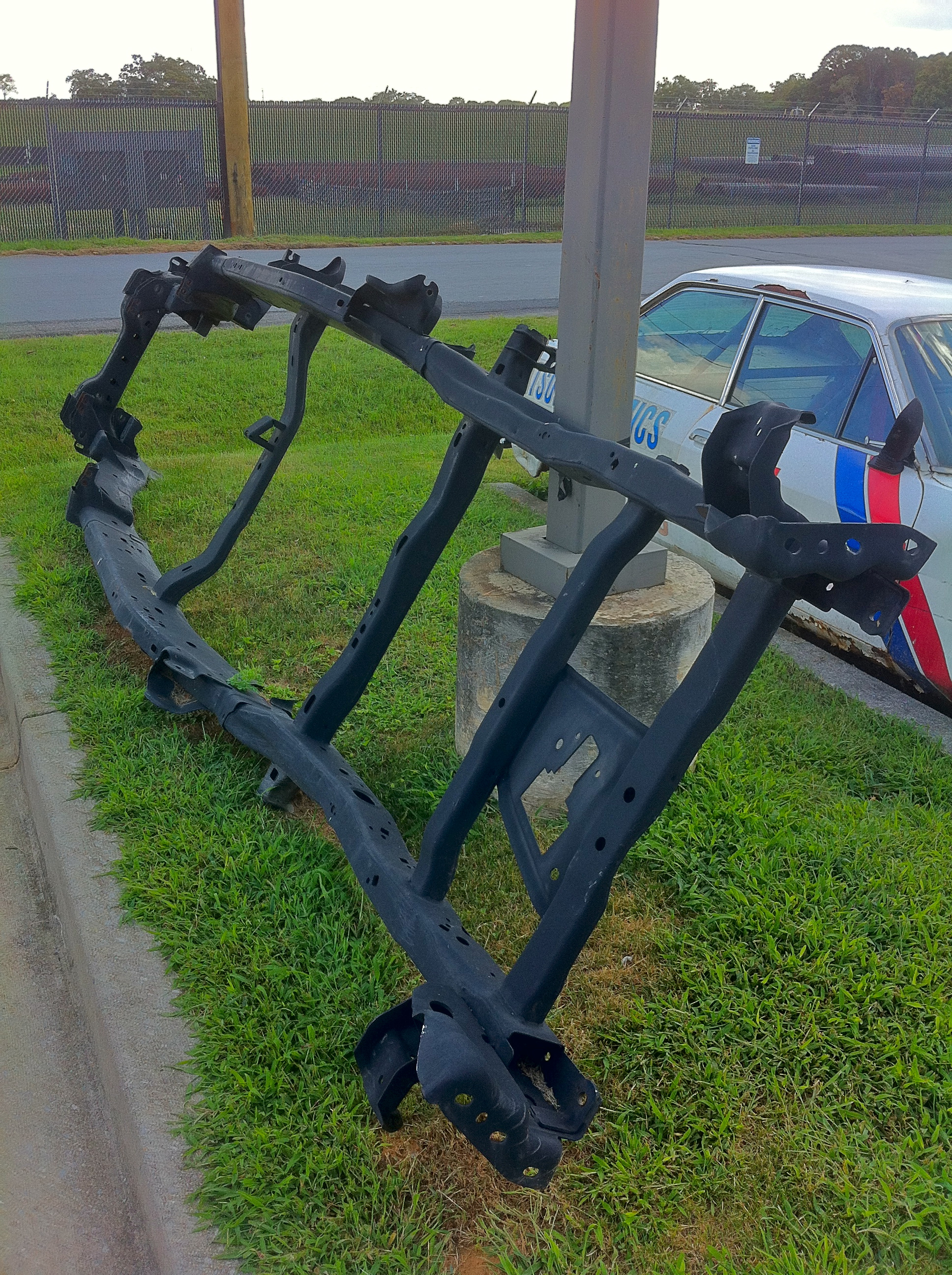
A ladder frame, named for its shape

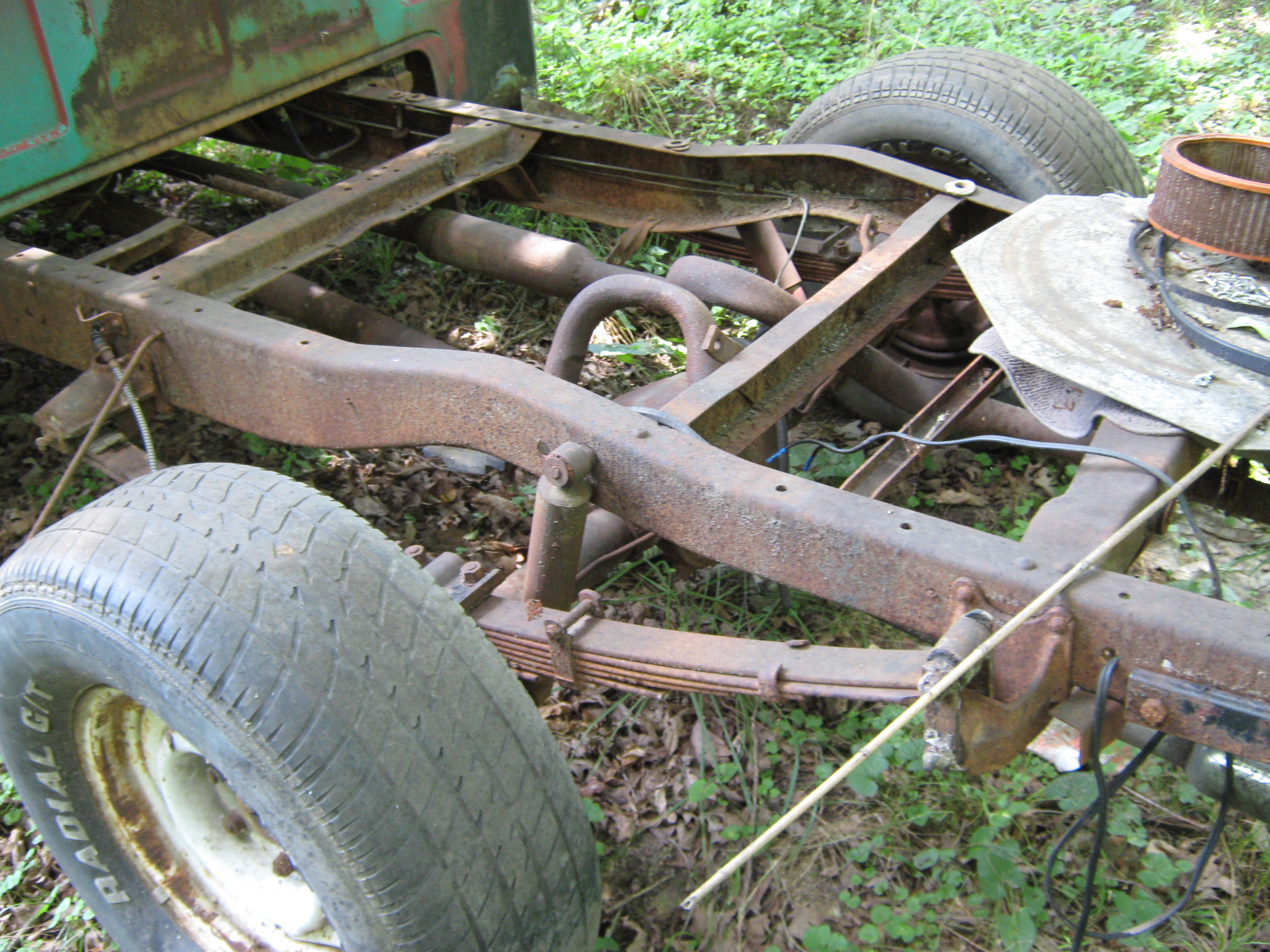
Pickup truck frame, with heavy c-shaped longitudinal rails (slightly arced over the rear axle), a similarly sized c-shaped crossmember just forward of the axle, and a tophat-shaped smaller gauge crossmember towards the rear

Typically, the material used to construct vehicle chassis and frames include carbon steel for strength or aluminum alloys to achieve a more lightweight construction. In the case of a separate chassis, the frame is made up of structural elements called the rails or beams. These are ordinarily made of steel channel sections by folding, rolling, or pressing steel plate.

There are three main designs for these. If the material is folded twice, an open-ended cross-section, either C-shaped or hat-shaped (U-shaped), results. "Boxed" frames contain closed chassis rails, either by welding them up or by using premanufactured metal tubing.

=== C-Shaped ===
By far the most common, the C-channel rail has been used on nearly every type of vehicle at one time or another. It is made by taking a flat piece of steel (usually ranging in thickness from 1/8" to 3/16", but up to 1/2" or more in some heavy-duty trucks) and rolling both sides over to form a C-shaped beam running the length of the vehicle. C-channel is typically more flexible than (fully) boxed of the same gauge.

=== Hat ===
Hat frames resemble a "U" and may be either right-side-up or inverted, with the open area facing down. They are not commonly used due to weakness and a propensity to rust. However, they can be found on 1936–1954 Chevrolet cars and some Studebakers.

Abandoned for a while, the hat frame regained popularity when companies started welding it to the bottom of unibody cars, effectively creating a boxed frame.

=== Boxed ===
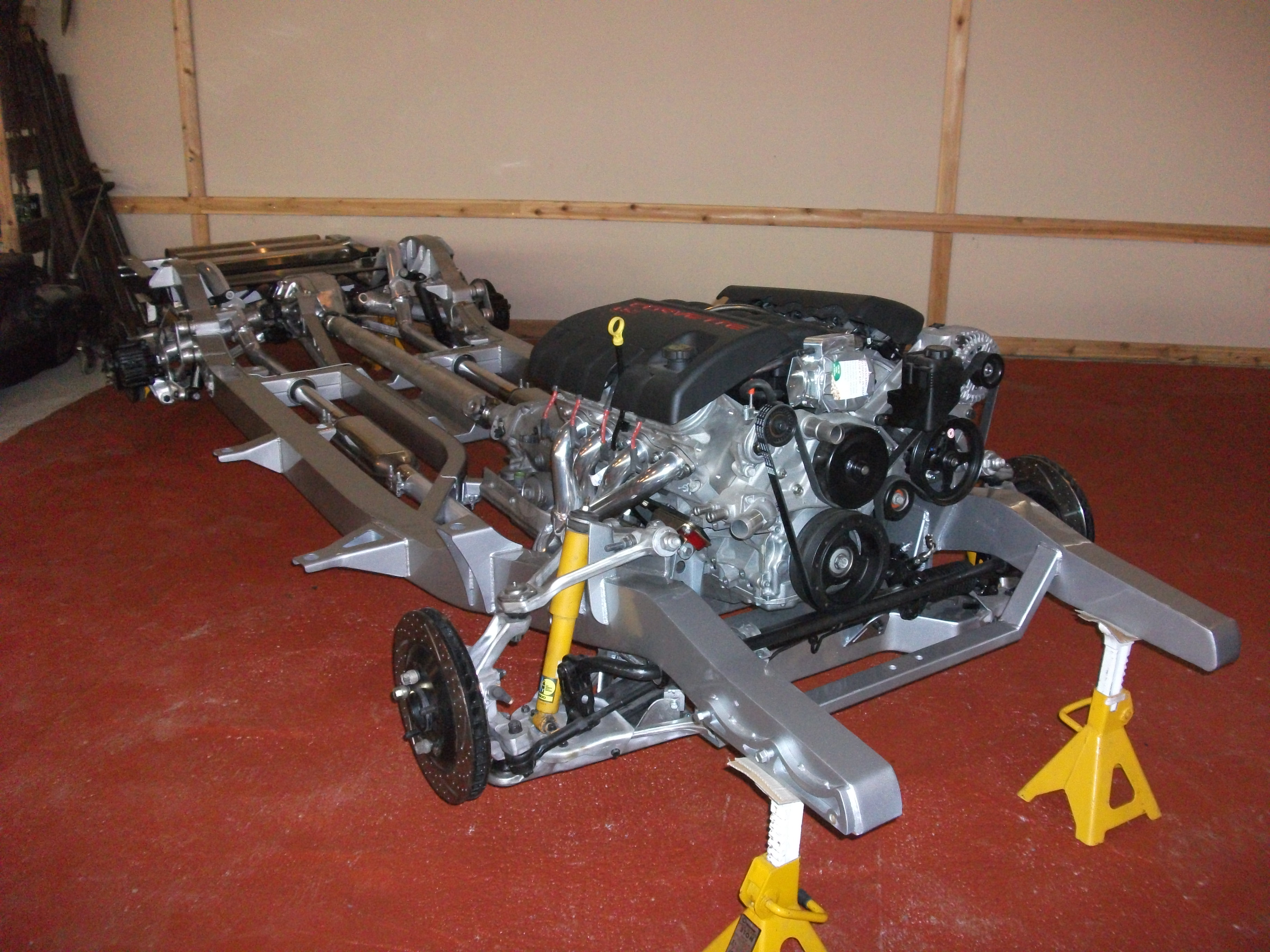
High-performance custom frame, using boxed rails and tube sections

Originally, boxed frames were made by welding two matching C-rails together to form a rectangular tube. Modern techniques, however, use a process similar to making C-rails in that a piece of steel is bent into four sides and then welded where both ends meet.

In the 1960s, the boxed frames of conventional American cars were spot-welded in multiple places down the seam; when turned into NASCAR "stock car" racers, the box was continuously welded from end to end for extra strength.

=== Design features ===
While appearing at first glance as a simple form made of metal, frames encounter significant stress and are built accordingly. The first issue addressed is "beam height", or the height of the vertical side of a frame. The taller the frame, the better it can resist vertical flex when force is applied to the top of the frame. This is the reason semi-trucks have taller frame rails than other vehicles instead of just being thicker.

As looks, ride quality, and handling became more important to consumers, new shapes were incorporated into frames. The most visible of these are arches and kick-ups. Instead of running straight over both axles, arched frames sit lower—roughly level with their axles—and curve up over the axles and then back down on the other side for bumper placement. Kick-ups do the same thing without curving down on the other side and are more common on the front ends.

Another feature are the tapered rails that narrow vertically or horizontally in front of a vehicle's cabin. This is done mainly on trucks to save weight and slightly increase room for the engine since the front of the vehicle does not bear as much load as the back. Design developments include frames that use multiple shapes in the same frame rail. For example, some pickup trucks have a boxed frame in front of the cab, shorter, narrower rails underneath the cab, and regular C-rails under the bed.

On perimeter frames, the areas where the rails connect from front to center and center to rear are weak compared to regular frames, so that section is boxed in, creating what are called "torque boxes".

== Types ==
=== Full under-body frames ===
==== Ladder frame ====
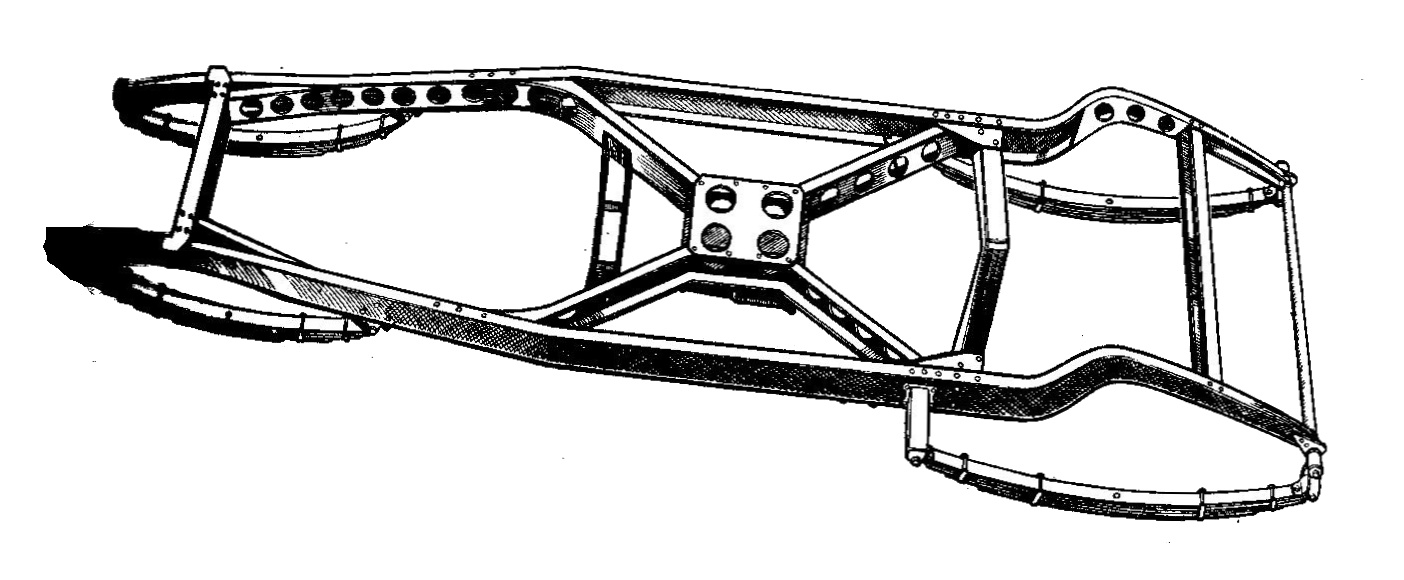
Ladder chassis with diagonal cross-bracing and lightening holes

Named for its resemblance to a ladder, the ladder frame is one of the oldest, simplest, and most frequently used under-body, separate chassis/frame designs. It consists of two symmetrical beams, rails, or channels, running the length of the vehicle, connected by several transverse cross-members. Initially seen on almost all vehicles, the ladder frame was gradually phased out on cars in favor of perimeter frames and unitized body construction. It is now seen mainly on large trucks. This design offers good side impact resistance because of its continuous rails from front to rear, but poor resistance to torsion or warping if simple, perpendicular cross-members are used. The vehicle's overall height will be greater due to the floor pan sitting above the frame instead of inside it.

==== Backbone tube ====
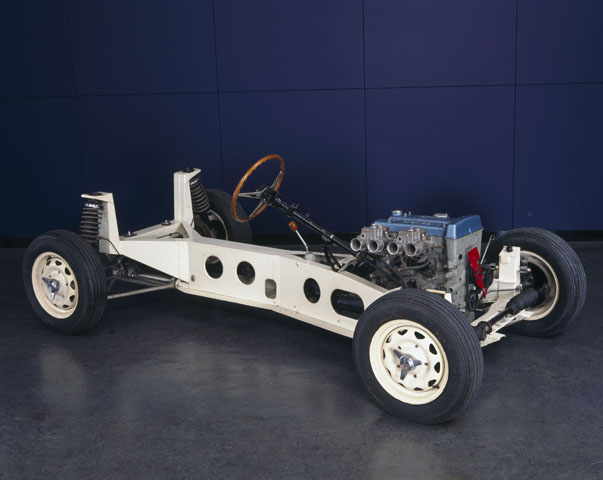
Backbone chassis of the 1962 Lotus Elan

A backbone chassis is a type of automotive construction with chassis that is similar to the body-on-frame design. Instead of a relatively flat, ladder-like structure with two longitudinal, parallel frame rails, it consists of a central, strong tubular backbone (usually rectangular in cross-section) that carries the power-train and connects the front and rear suspension attachment structures. Although the backbone is frequently drawn upward into, and mostly above the floor of the vehicle, the body is still placed on or over (sometimes straddling) this structure from above.

==== X-frame ====
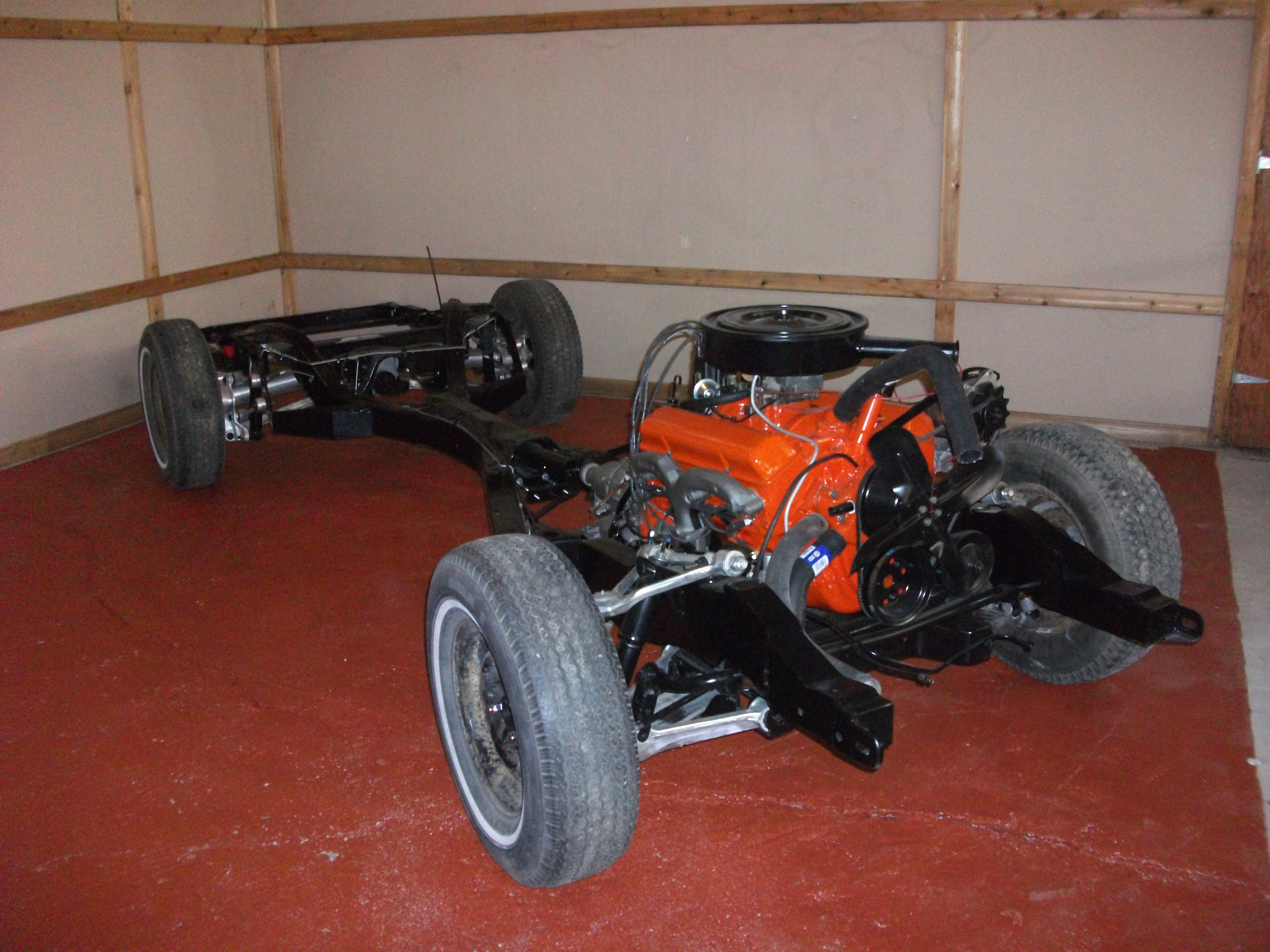
Rolling X-frame chassis

An X-frame is built generally in the shape of the letter X, beginning in its simplest form with two frame rails parallel to one another in the engine compartment, crossing (or joining) in the middle, then returning to parallel at or after the rear axle. The purpose of the design was to allow the floor pan to be placed lower than had been possible sitting atop a full ladder frame. Centerline humps, however, provided for the power train and central crossmember, intruded into the cabin space.

The X-frame varied in stiffness depending on the gauge and proportion of its cross-section, but could be rigid when heavy enough. It was widely used, as in the exclusive Mercedes-Benz 300 "Adenaeur" limousines, and for some full-sized GM cars of the late 1950s and early 1960s.

A shortcoming was weakness to side-impact, resulting in the addition of side rails (that still allowed a recessed cabin), spurring development of the perimeter frame.

==== Perimeter frame ====
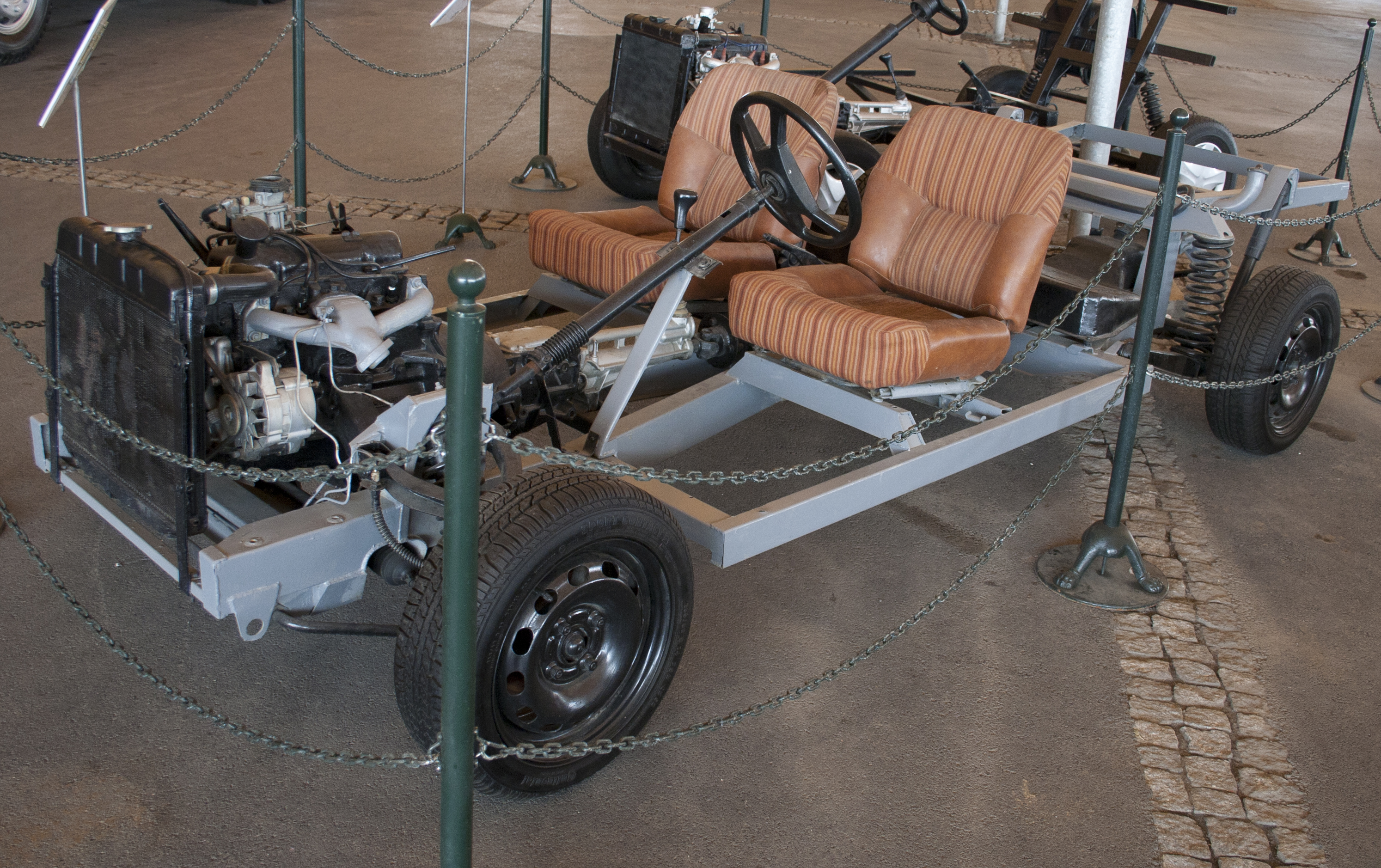
Bertone FW11 prototype with perimeter frame

Similar to a ladder frame, but the middle sections of the frame rails sit outboard of the front and rear rails, routed around the passenger footwells, inside the rocker and sill panels. This allowed the floor pan to be lowered, especially the passenger footwells, lowering the passengers' seating height and thereby reducing both the roof-line and overall vehicle height, as well as the center of gravity, thus improving handling and road-holding in passenger cars.

This became the prevalent design for body-on-frame cars in the United States, but not in the rest of the world, until the unibody gained popularity. For example, Hudson introduced this construction on their third generation Commodore models in 1948. This frame type allowed for annual model changes, and lower cars, introduced in the 1950s to increase sales – without costly structural changes.

The Ford Panther platform, discontinued in 2011, was one of the last perimeter frame passenger car platforms in the United States. The fourth to seventh generation Chevrolet Corvette used a perimeter frame integrated with an internal skeleton that serves as a clamshell.

In addition to a lowered roof, the perimeter frame allows lower seating positions when that is desirable, and offers better safety in the event of a side impact. However, the design lacks stiffness because the transition areas from front to center and center to rear reduce beam and torsional resistance and is used in combination with torque boxes and soft suspension settings.

==== Platform frame ====
This is a modification of the perimeter frame, or of the backbone frame, in which the passenger compartment floor, and sometimes the luggage compartment floor, have been integrated into the frame as loadbearing parts for strength and rigidity. The sheet metal used to assemble the components needs to be stamped with ridges and hollows to give it strength.

Platform chassis were used on several successful European cars, most notably the Volkswagen Beetle, where it was called "body-on-pan" construction. Another German example are the Mercedes-Benz "Ponton" cars of the 1950s and 1960s, where it was called a "frame floor" in English-language advertisements.

The French Renault 4, of which over eight million were made, also used a platform frame. The frame of the Citroën 2CV used a minimal interpretation of a platform chassis under its body.

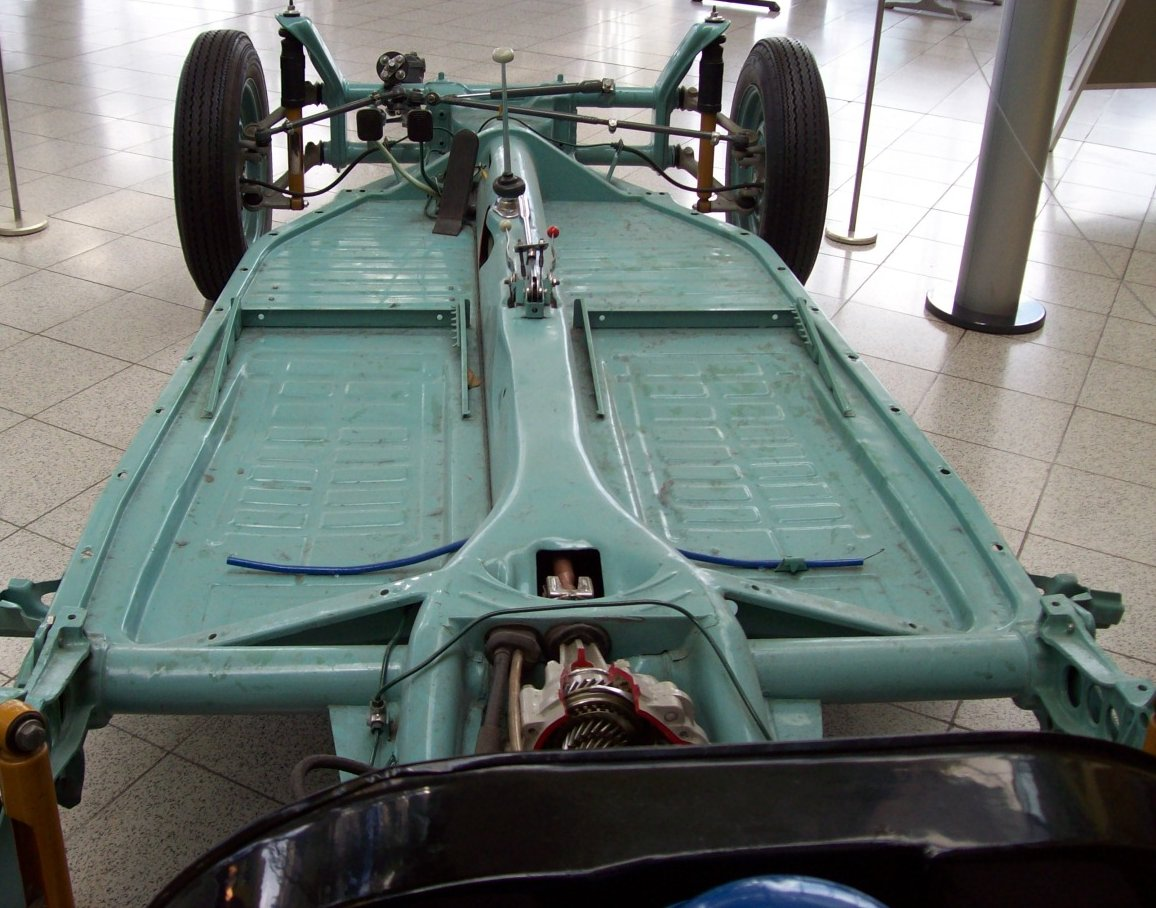
VW Beetle "platform frame" chassis

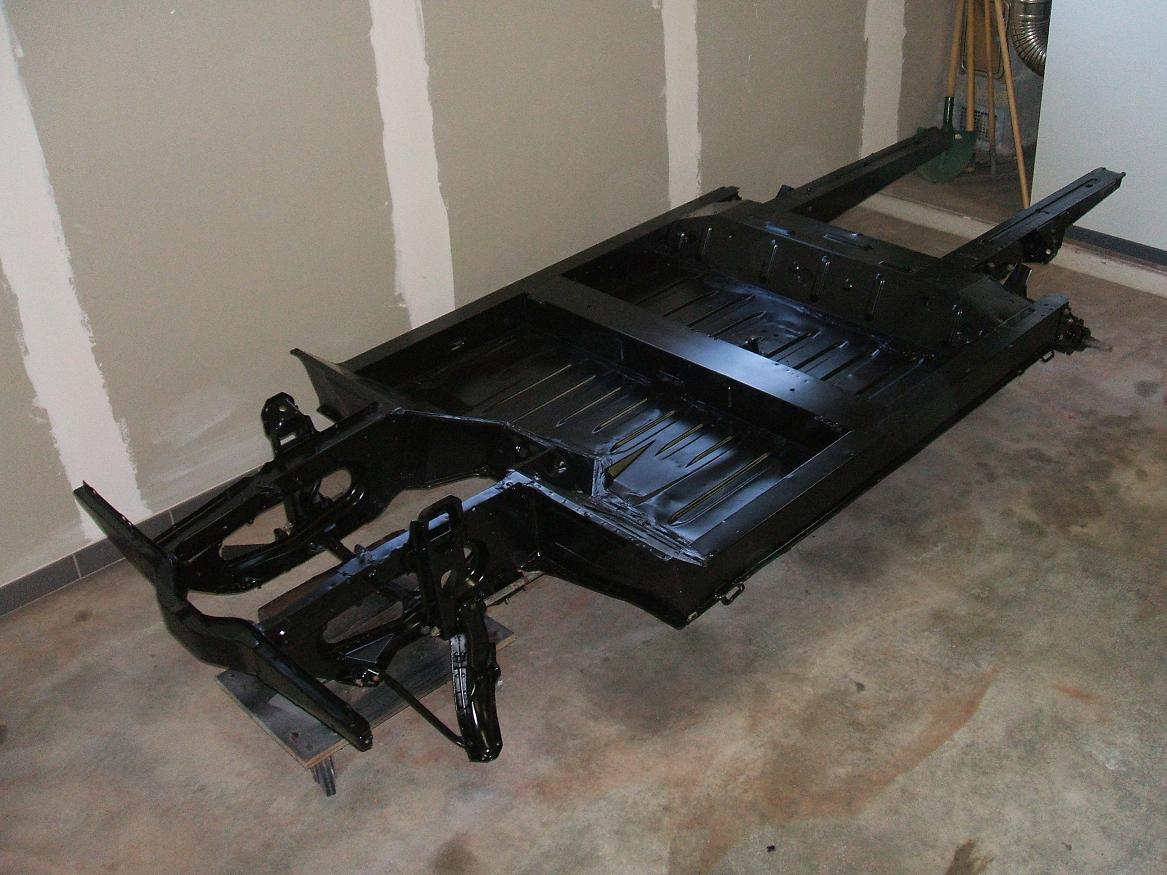
Renault 4 "platform frame" chassis

Where the Volkswagen frame design relies heavily on a strong backbone, the Renault design is much closer to a typical perimeter frame

=== Space frame ===
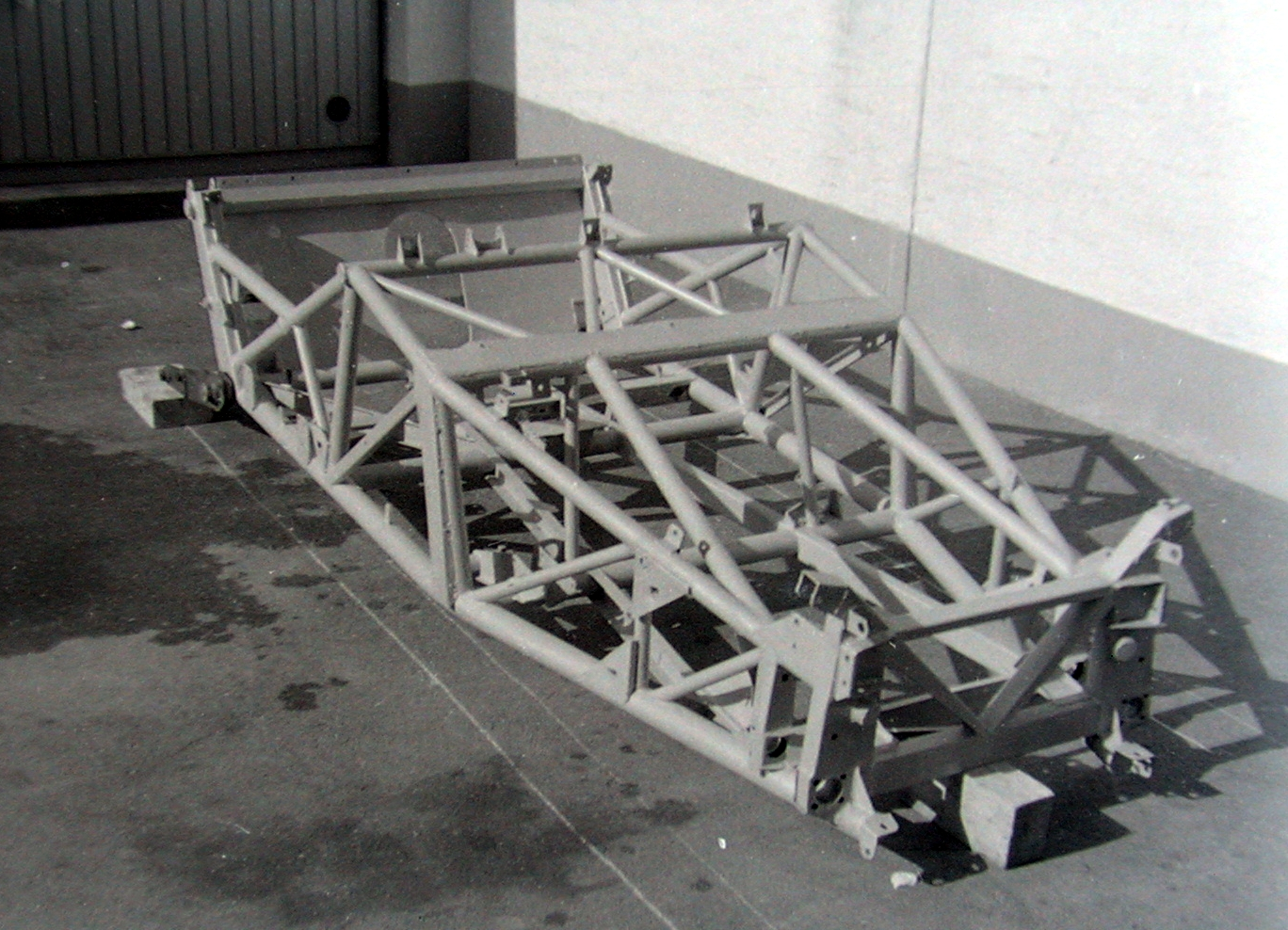
Jaguar C-Type racing car frame. The driver entered from the top.

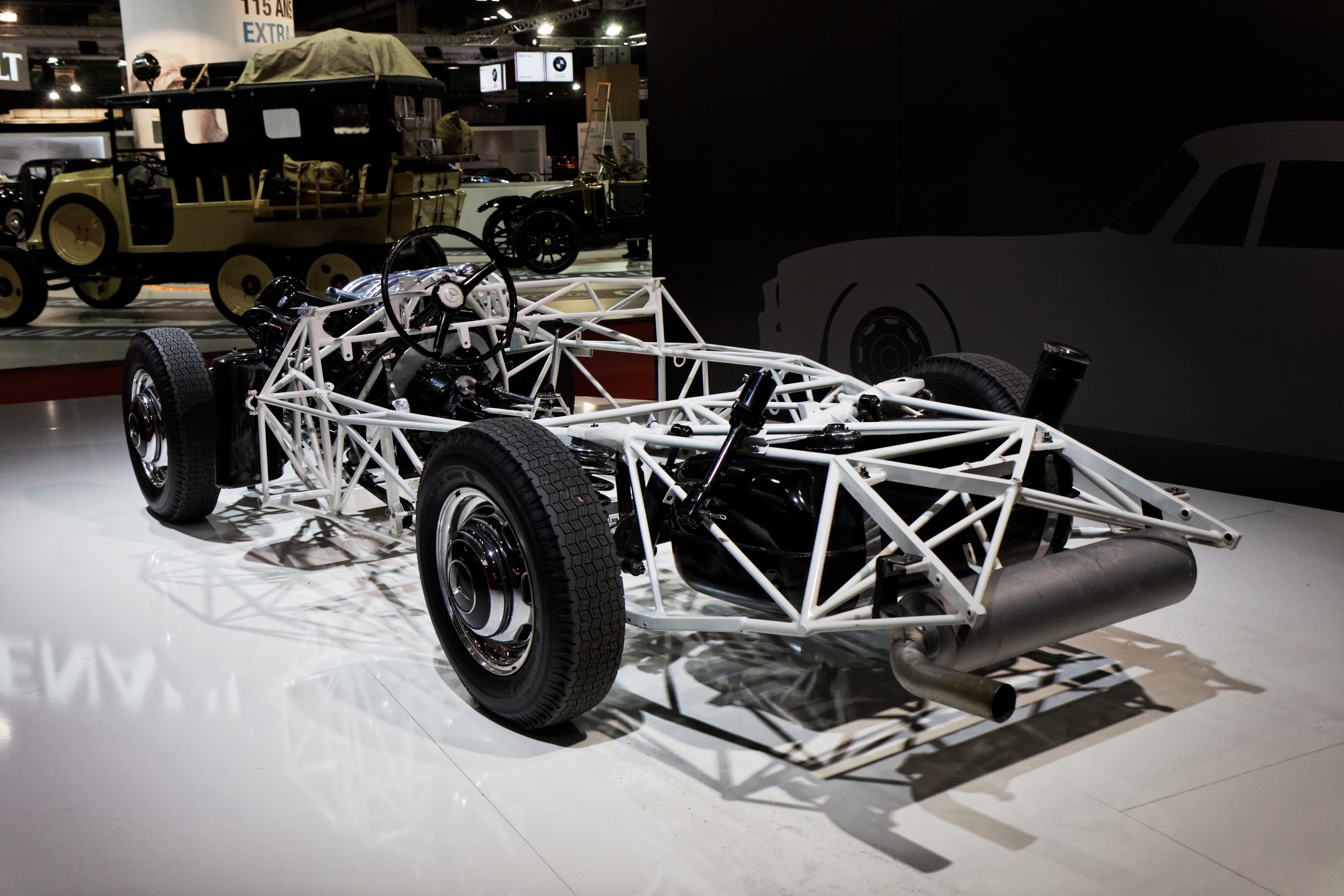
The tubular frame of the Mercedes-Benz 300 SL's exceptionally high sills spawned its iconic upward-opening gullwing doors

Originally known as a "tubular frame", the space frame (also "spaceframe") utilizes tubular steel, alloy, or carbon fibre to create a load-bearing three-dimensional skeleton, to which the suspension, engine, and body panels are attached. As the body panels have limited or no structural function, geometry is used to maximize rigidity and minimize weight, frequently employing triangles where all the forces in each strut are either tensile or compressive. The lack of bending forces allows members to be kept to a minimum weight and cross-section.

The first true spaceframe chassis were designed and produced in the 1930s by Buckminster Fuller and William Bushnell Stout, who understood the theory supporting them from either architecture or aircraft design, resulting in the bus-like Dymaxion and Stout Scarab. Maximizing space while minimizing weight were the goals.

With its high strength-to-weight ratio, the space frame was adapted to automobile racing following World War II. The 1951 Jaguar C-Type racing sports car utilized a lightweight, multi-tubular, triangulated frame over which an aerodynamic aluminum body was crafted. The form saw mass production with the 1954 introduction of the Mercedes-Benz 300 SL "Gullwing" sports car, the fastest road-going automobile of its day. The car's exceptionally high sills made conventional doors impractical, spawning the model's iconic gullwing doors.

In 1994, the Audi A8 was the first mass-market car with an aluminium chassis, made feasible by integrating an aluminium space-frame into the bodywork. Audi A8 models have since used this construction method co-developed with Alcoa, and marketed as the Audi Space Frame.

A tubular frame that is not load-bearing is not a true space frame. The Italian term Superleggera (meaning 'super-light') was trademarked for lightweight sports-car body construction that still requires its own chassis, and thus only resembles a space-frame chassis in general look and construction method. It utilizes a geodesic-like network of narrow tubes running under the body, up the fenders and over the radiator, cowl, and roof, and under the rear window, to provide form and attachment points for a sheetmetal skin, typically aluminum for weight-savings, as rigidity is not a consideration.

=== Unibody ===
Integrated unibody examples

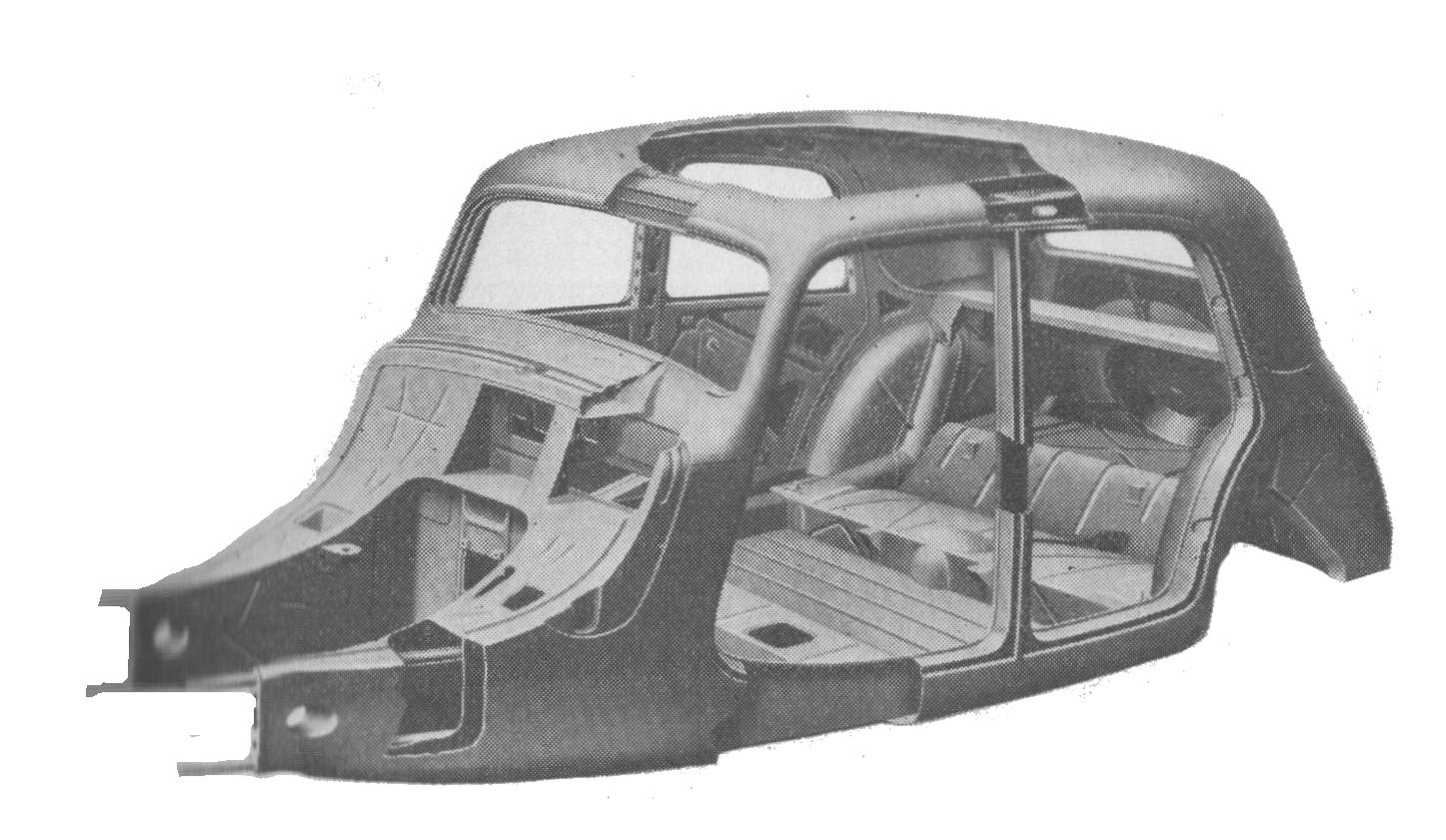
Citroën Traction Avant unitized body (1934)

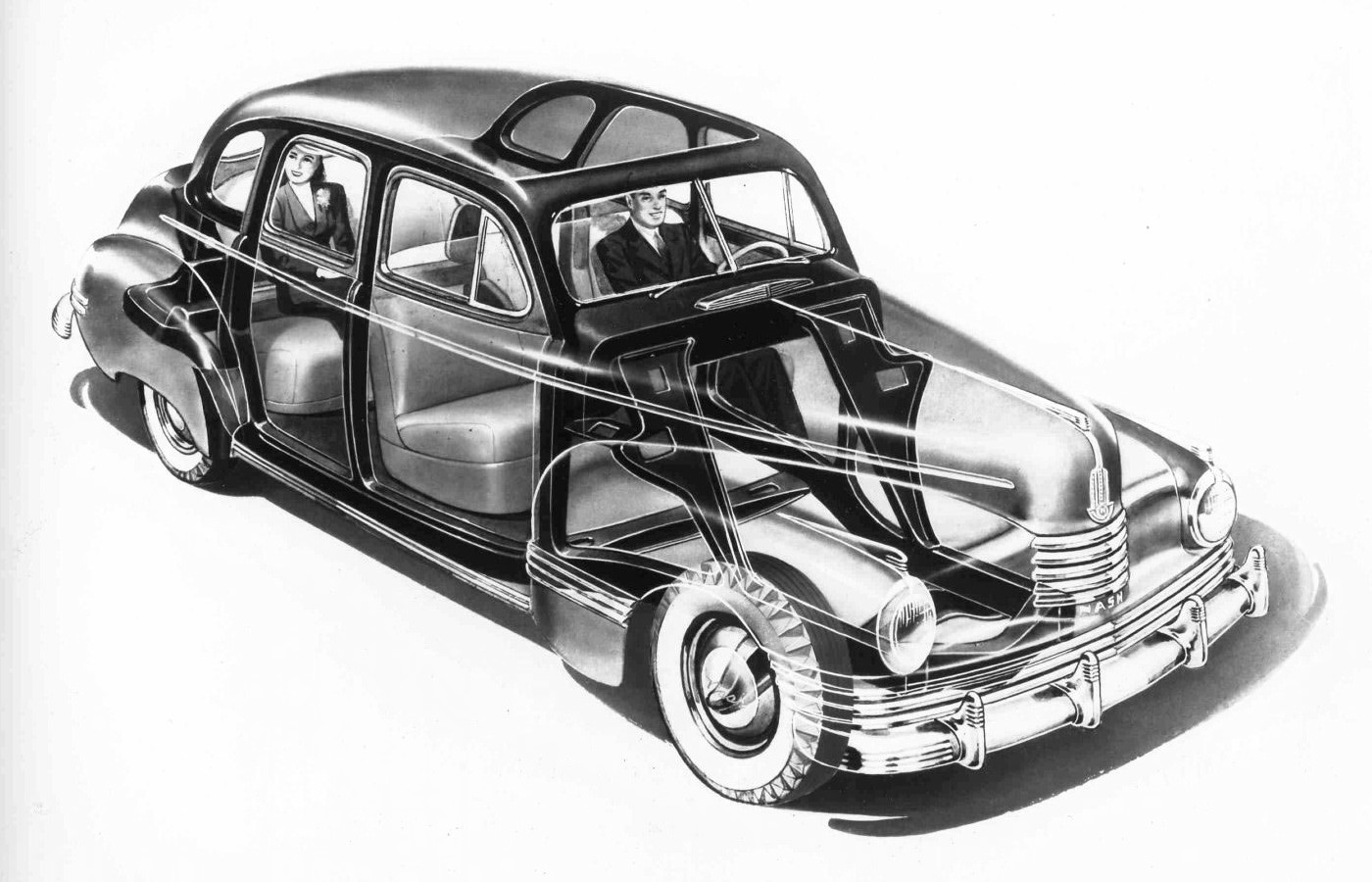
1942 Nash Ambassador 600 cutaway drawing

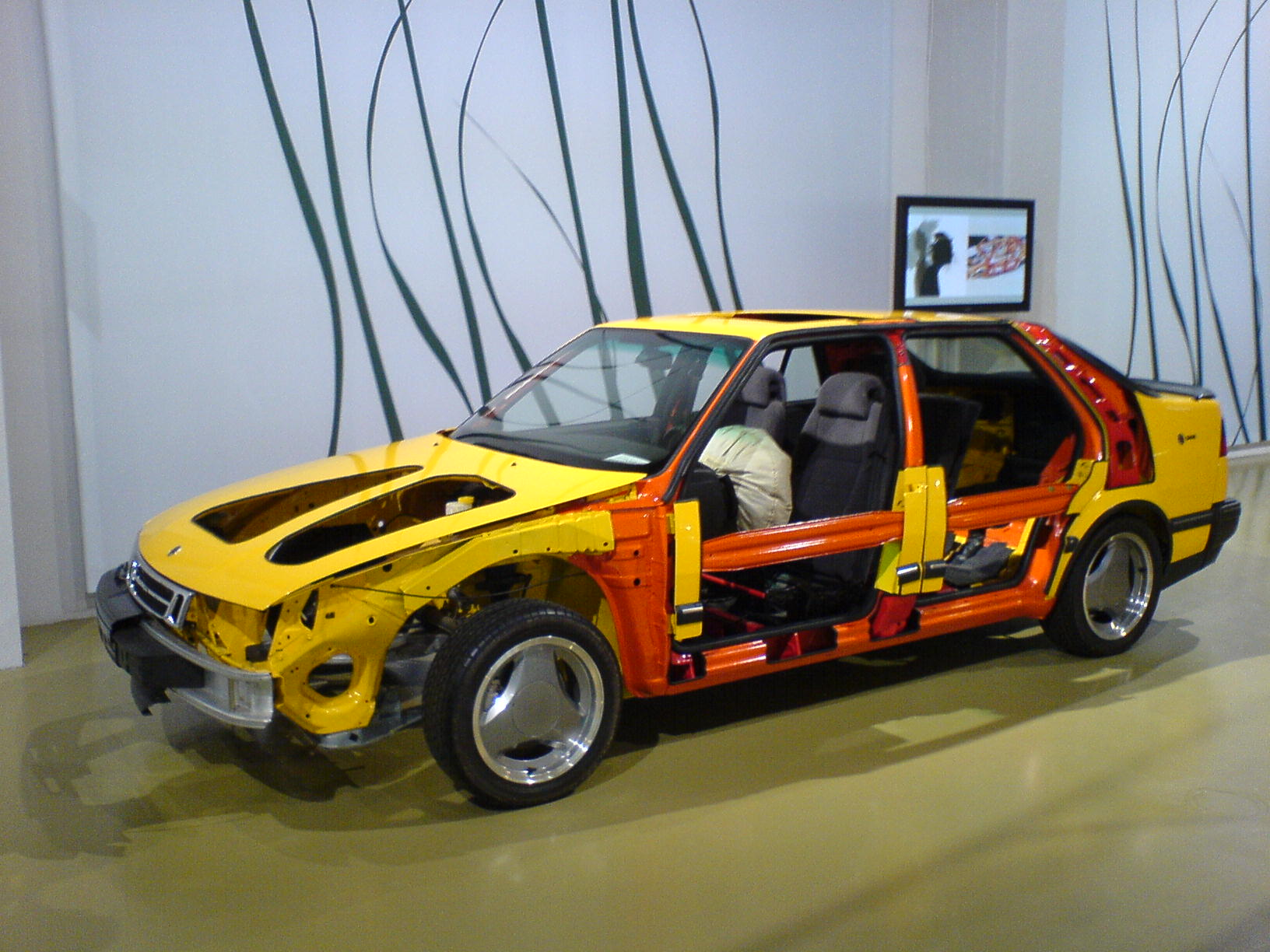
Saab 9000 "safety cell" in red and orange (2005)

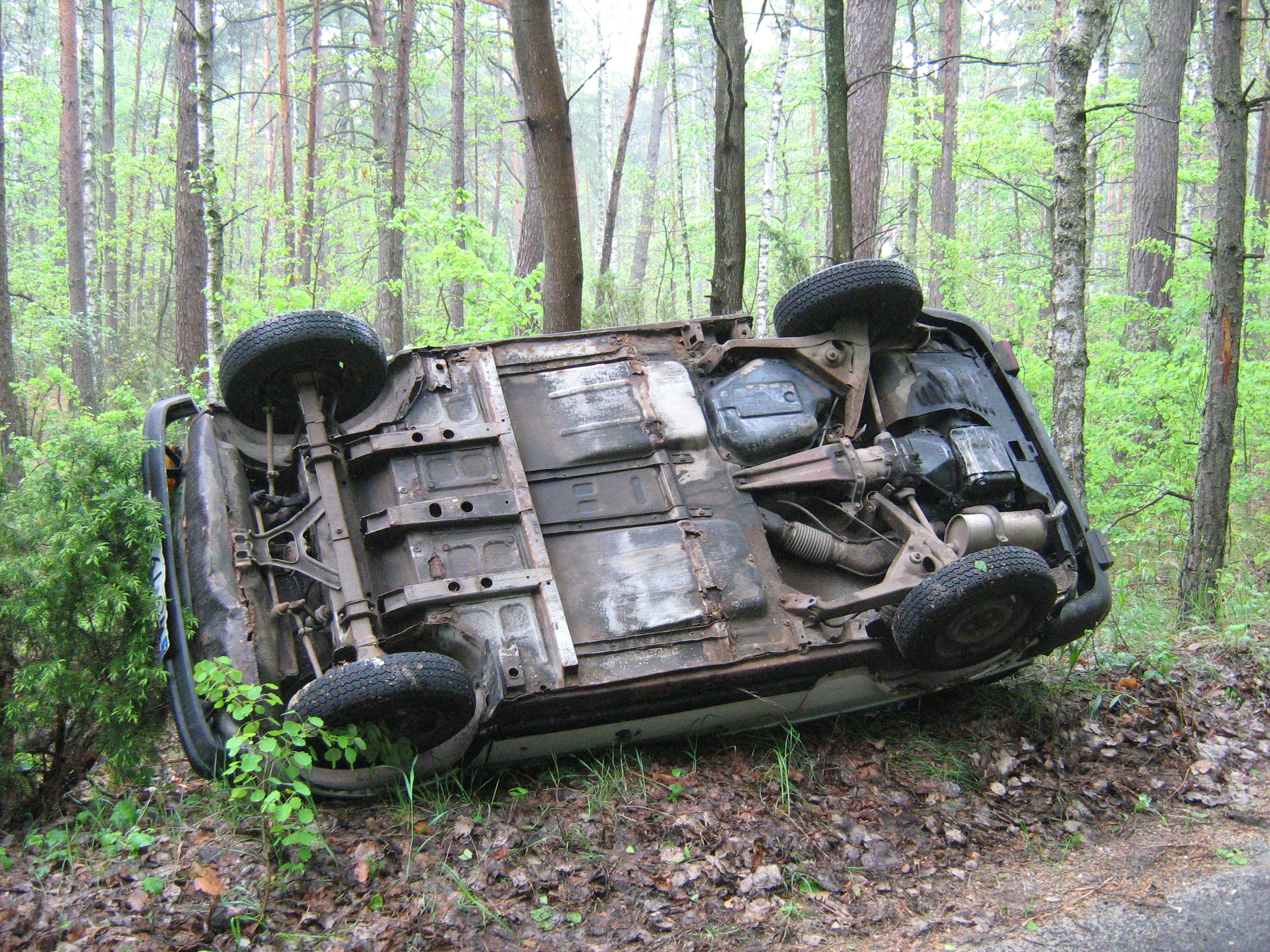
Polski Fiat 126p shows underfloor welded reinforcements, but no distinct frame

The terms "unibody" and "unit-body" are short for "unitized body", "unitary construction", or alternatively (fully) integrated body and frame/chassis. It is defined as:

A type of body/frame construction in which the body of the vehicle, its floor pan and chassis form a single structure. Such a design is generally lighter and more rigid than a vehicle having a separate body and frame.

Vehicle structure has shifted from the traditional body-on-frame architecture to the lighter unitized/integrated body structure that is now used for most cars.

Integral frame and body construction requires more than simply welding an unstressed body to a conventional frame. In a fully integrated body structure, the entire car is a load-carrying unit that handles all the loads experienced by the vehicle – forces from driving and cargo loads. Integral-type bodies for wheeled vehicles are typically manufactured by welding preformed metal panels and other components together, by forming or casting whole sections as one piece, or by combining these techniques. Although this is sometimes also referred to as a monocoque structure, because the car's outer skin and panels are made load-bearing, there are still ribs, bulkheads, and box sections to reinforce the body, making the description semi-monocoque more appropriate.

The first attempt to develop such a design technique was on the 1922 Lancia Lambda to provide structural stiffness and a lower body height for its torpedo car body. The Lambda had an open layout with unstressed roof, which made it less of a monocoque shell and more like a bowl. One thousand were produced.

A key role in developing the unitary body was played by the American firm the Budd Company, now ThyssenKrupp Budd. Budd supplied pressed-steel bodywork, fitted to separate frames, to automakers Dodge, Ford, Buick, and the French company, Citroën.

In 1930, Joseph Ledwinka, an engineer with Budd, designed an automobile prototype with a full unitary construction.

Citroën purchased this fully unitary body design for the Citroën Traction Avant. This high-volume, mass-production car was introduced in 1934 and sold 760,000 units over the next 23 years of production. This application was the first iteration of the modern structural integration of body and chassis, using spot welded deeply stamped steel sheets into a structural cage, including sills, pillars, and roof beams. In addition to a unitary body with no separate frame, the Traction Avant also featured other innovations such as front-wheel drive. The result was a low-slung vehicle with an open, flat-floored interior.

For the Chrysler Airflow (1934–1937), Budd supplied a variation – three main sections from the Airflow's body were welded into what Chrysler called a bridge-truss construction. Unfortunately, this method was not ideal because the panel fits were poor. To convince a skeptical public of the strength of unibody, both Citroën and Chrysler created advertising films showing cars surviving after being pushed off a cliff.

Opel was the second European and the first German car manufacturer to produce a car with a unibody structure – production of the compact Olympia started in 1935. A larger Kapitän went into production in 1938, although its front longitudinal beams were stamped separately and then attached to the main body. It was so successful that the Soviet post-war mass produced GAZ-M20 Pobeda of 1946 copied unibody structure from the Opel Kapitän. Later Soviet limousine GAZ-12 ZIM of 1950 introduced unibody design to automobiles with a wheelbase as long as 3.2 m (126 in).

The streamlined 1936 Lincoln-Zephyr with conventional front-engine, rear-wheel-drive layout utilized a unibody structure. By 1941, unit construction was no longer a new idea for cars, "but it was unheard of in the [American] low-price field [and] Nash wanted a bigger share of that market." The single unit-body construction of the Nash 600 provided weight savings and Nash's Chairman and CEO, George W. Mason was convinced "that unibody was the wave of the future."

Since then, more cars were redesigned to the unibody structure, which is now "considered standard in the industry". By 1960, the unitized body design was used by Detroit's Big Three on their compact cars (Ford Falcon, Plymouth Valiant, and Chevrolet Corvair). After Nash merged with Hudson Motors to form American Motors Corporation, its Rambler-badged automobiles continued exclusively building variations of the unibody.

Although the 1934 Chrysler Airflow had a weaker-than-usual frame and body framework welded to the chassis to provide stiffness, in 1960, Chrysler moved from body-on-frame construction to a unit-body design for most of its cars.

Most of the American-manufactured unibody automobiles used torque boxes in their vehicle design to reduce vibrations and chassis flex, except for the Chevy II, which had a bolt-on front apron (erroneously referred to as a subframe).

The unibody is now the preferred construction for mass-market automobiles. This design provides weight savings, improved space utilization, and ease of manufacture. The rapid development of finite element analysis (FEA) methods in the 1970s has allowed engineers to easily optimise unibody structures for strength, crash protection and minimal material use. Acceptance grew dramatically in the wake of the two energy crises of the 1970s and that of the 2000s in which compact SUVs using a truck platform (primarily the USA market) were subjected to CAFE standards after 2005 (by the late 2000s truck-based compact SUVs were phased out and replaced with crossovers). An additional advantage of a strong-bodied car lies in the improved crash protection for its passengers.

==== Uniframe ====
American Motors (with its partner Renault) during the late 1970s incorporated unibody construction when designing the Jeep Cherokee (XJ) platform using the manufacturing principles (unisides, floorplan with integrated frame rails and crumple zones, and roof panel) used in its passenger cars, such as the Hornets and all-wheel-drive Eagles for a new type of frame called the "Uniframe [...] a robust stamped steel frame welded to a strong unit-body structure, giving the strength of a conventional heavy frame with the weight advantages of Unibody construction." This design was also used with the XJC concept developed by American Motors before its absorption by Chrysler, which later became the Jeep Grand Cherokee (ZJ). The design is still used in modern-day sport utility vehicles such as the Jeep Grand Cherokee and Land Rover Defender. This design is also used in large vans such as Ford Transit, VW Crafter and Mercedes Sprinter.

=== Partial frames ===
==== Subframe ====
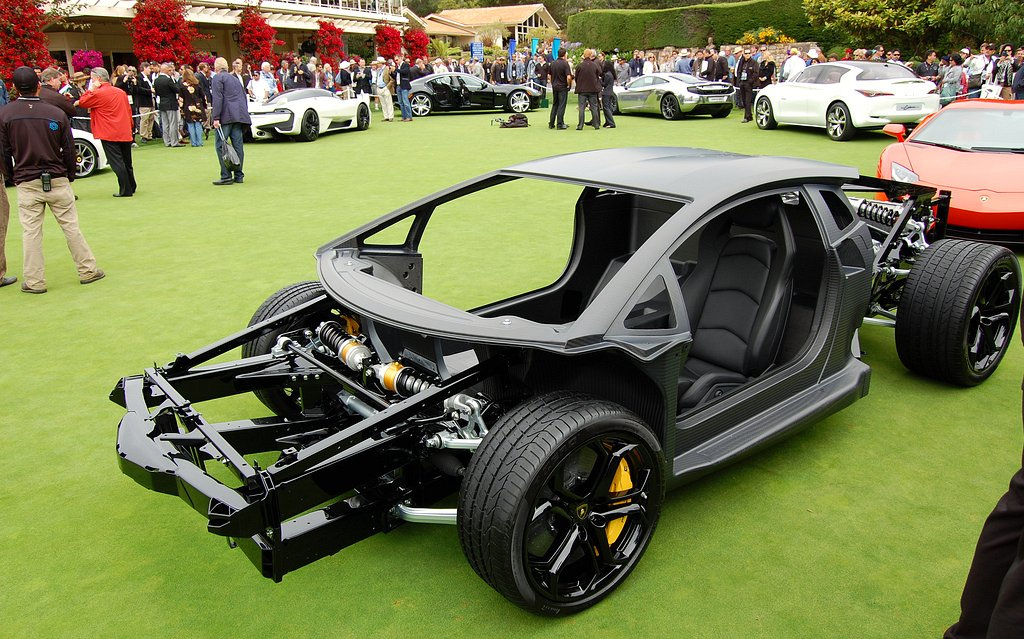
The Lamborghini Aventador has a carbon fibre central monocoque, with front and rear steel subframes, mounting the mechanicals

A subframe is a distinct structural frame component, to reinforce or complement a particular section of a vehicle's structure. Typically attached to a unibody or a monocoque, the rigid subframe can handle great forces from the engine and drive train. It can transfer them evenly to a wide area of relatively thin sheet metal of a unitized body shell. Subframes are often found at the front or rear end of cars and are used to attach the suspension to the vehicle. A subframe may also contain the engine and transmission. It normally has pressed or box steel construction but may be tubular and/or other material.

Examples of passenger car use include the 1967–1981 GM F platform, the numerous years and models built on the GM X platform (1962), GM's M/L platform vans (Chevrolet Astro/GMC Safari, which included an all-wheel drive variant), and the unibody AMC Pacer that incorporated a front subframe to isolate the passenger compartment from the engine, suspension, and steering loads.

== Structural elements ==
Some vehicles do not have a traditional frame or the traditional frame is only used in some areas of the vehicle. Those parts are a structural part of the vehicle, they handle part of or all of the structural stresses. Those parts may be used in conjunction with traditional frames, with other structural parts or by themselves.

== See also ==
- Bicycle frame
- Body-on-frame
- Chassis
- Coachbuilder
- Locomotive frame
- Monocoque
- Motorcycle frame
- C-channel
