= Revere =

Revere may refer to:

== Brands and companies ==
- Revere Ware, a U.S. cookware brand owned by World Kitchen
- Revere Camera Company, American designer of cameras and tape recorders
- Revere Copper Company
- ReVere, a car company recognised by the Classic Car Club of America
- LG Revere, a line of cellular flip phones

== People ==
- Anne Revere, U.S. film actress of the 1940s
- Ben Revere, American baseball player in the Toronto Blue Jays organization
- Joseph Warren Revere (businessman), American businessman, son of Paul Revere
- Joseph Warren Revere (general), Union general in the American Civil War, grandson of Paul Revere
- Lawrence Revere, U.S. author and professional gambler
- Paul Revere, U.S. Revolutionary War militia leader
- Paul Revere (musician), leader of the rock band Paul Revere & the Raiders
- Paul Revere Braniff, an airline entrepreneur

== Places ==
=== Italy ===
- Revere, Lombardy, a frazione of Borgo Mantovano in the province of Mantua

=== United States ===
- Revere, Massachusetts, a city in Suffolk County, just outside Boston
  - Revere Beach, the first public beach in the United States
  - Revere Beach (MBTA station)
- Revere, Minnesota, a city in Redwood County
- Revere, Missouri, a village in Clark County

== Other uses ==
- Revere (band), a UK-based post-rock group
- Revere (comics), a 2000 AD comic series by John Smith
- Revere High School (disambiguation)
- Revere Local School District, in Summit County, Ohio

== See also ==
- Mrs. Revere Stakes
- Paul Revere (disambiguation)
- Paul Revere's Ride
- Reverence (disambiguation)
- Reverend (disambiguation)
