= Gardner (automobile) =

Defunct American motor vehicle manufacturer

Gardner Motor Company
- Type: Public
- Industry: Automotive
- Founded: 1919; 107 years ago in St. Louis, Missouri
- Founder: Russell Gardner
- Defunct: 1932; 94 years ago
- Fate: Dissolved

Gardner was an automobile manufacturer based out of St. Louis, Missouri, producing cars from 1920 to 1931. The company was founded by Russell Gardner and manufactured over 40,000 vehicles in total that ranged from 4, 6 and 8-cylinder models.

As collector cars, some models of the Gardner automobile have been deemed "Full Classics" by the Classic Car Club of America.

== History ==
=== Banner Buggy Company and automobile company founding ===
Russell Eugene Gardner moved from Tennessee to St. Louis in 1879. In 1882, he established the Banner Buggy Company, which became one of the largest horse-drawn carriage manufacturers in the United States in the late 1800s.In 1910, the company started to produce bodies for automobile manufacturers and by 1915, Banner Buggy Co. was assembling complete Chevrolet automobiles in St. Louis and controlled Chevrolet distribution west of the Mississippi River.

During World War I, Gardner sold his Chevrolet operations to General Motors after his three sons entered military service. Following the war, his sons established the Gardner Motor Company in 1919, with Russell E. Gardner Sr. serving as chairman, Russell E. Gardner Jr. as president, and Fred Gardner as vice-president.

=== Production ===
The company produced vehicles using components sourced from outside suppliers, including Lycoming engines throughout its production. Its first model, introduced in late 1919 for the 1920 model year, was a medium-priced four-cylinder automobile with a 112-inch (2,800 mm) wheelbase.

Production increased during the company's early years. Sales began from approximately 3,800 vehicles in 1921 to 9,000 in 1922.

In 1924, Erwin "Cannon Ball" Baker set a midwinter transcontinental record by driving a Gardner from New York City to Los Angeles in 4 days, 17 hours, and 8 minutes.

As demand increased, the company expanded its manufacturing capacity to 40,000 vehicles annually and broadened its model range by offering six-cylinder and eight-cylinder models in 1925. Four-cylinder models were discontinued the same year. Both 6-cylinder and 8-cylinder models remained in production through 1927. For the 1928 and 1929 model years, Gardner produced only 8-cylinder cars.

The interior of the Series 90 cars had many high-quality materials, such as silver-finished hardware, silk window curtains, walnut wood pieces and mohair upholstery (Series 75 and 80 did not have walnut in the interior.) All cars had a fuel and temperature gauge standard.

During the summer of 1929, Gardner announced two "very important" automobile contracts. The first was with Sears, Roebuck and Company, who wanted Gardner to develop a new car to be sold by mail order. The other was with New Era Motors, to manufacture the front-wheel-drive Ruxton. With the stock market crash in late 1929, both deals were cancelled.

In January 1930 the company announced a front-wheel-drive six-cylinder car, An 80 hp (60 kW) six on a 133 in (3,380 mm) wheelbase with a Baker-Raulang body which sported a longer hood and with distinctive low-slung lines. The vehicle used Lockheed hydraulic internal-expanding brakes and two-way hydraulic shock absorbers. This car never was subsequently released and only was developed as a prototype.

The 1931 models were the same as the 1930 model, just mildly updated.

=== Commercial vehicles ===
In 1927, Gardner partnered with St. Louis Coffin Company and started to produce funeral coaches with a purpose-built chassis and Lycoming 8 cylinder engines. Production grew to also offer ambulances and service cars in the following year. In 1932, Gardner offered a funeral coach powered by a V8 Pontiac engine.

=== Demise ===
In mid-1931, Russell E. Gardner Jr. solicited the permission of his stockholders to stop producing automobiles. The reasons he gave for his company's failure were that Gardner had been unprofitable after 1927 due to fierce competition from the major producers of automobiles and their control of many sources of parts supply. Automobile production ceased in 1931 but the Gardner funeral coach was built through 1932, with the company ending all production that year.

== Production ==
Year	Production	Model	Serial number
1919	1695	G, G-3, G-5	1000 to 2694
1920	3736	G, G-3, G-5	2695 to 6431
1921	(3242) 4678	G	6432 to 9673
1922	5663	T	9674 to ?
1923	6391		
1924	4311		
1925	2831		
1926	4237		
1927	3290	Six; 8-80; 8-90	
1928	3177	8-75; 8-85; 8-95	
1929	2130		
1930	1080		
1931	187		
Sum	43.406		
