= Revera =

Revera may refer to:

- Revera (company), a Canadian company that provides accommodation, care and services for seniors
- Ulmus 'Revera', an American hybrid cultivar

== See also ==
- Revere (disambiguation)
