= Reverend (disambiguation) =

The Reverend is a style most often used as a prefix to the names of Christian clergy and ministers.

Reverend may also refer to:

- Reverend (band), American heavy metal band
  - Reverend (EP), a 1989 EP by the band
- "Reverend" (song), by Kings of Leon, 2017
- Reverend and The Makers, an English indie pop band
  - Jon McClure or "The Reverend" (born 1981), lead singer for the band
- Reverend Musical Instruments, an American manufacturer of electric guitars and basses
- The Reverend (film), a 2011 British horror film
- Bertje Matulapelwa often called “The Reverend” (1941–2002), an Indonesian former football manager
- Bob Levy (comedian) or "The Reverend" (born 1962), American comedian and radio personality

== See also ==
- The Honourable
- Venerable (disambiguation)
- Reverence (disambiguation)
- Revenant (disambiguation)
