= Ruxton (automobile) =

Defunct American motor vehicle manufacturer

New Era Motors, Inc.
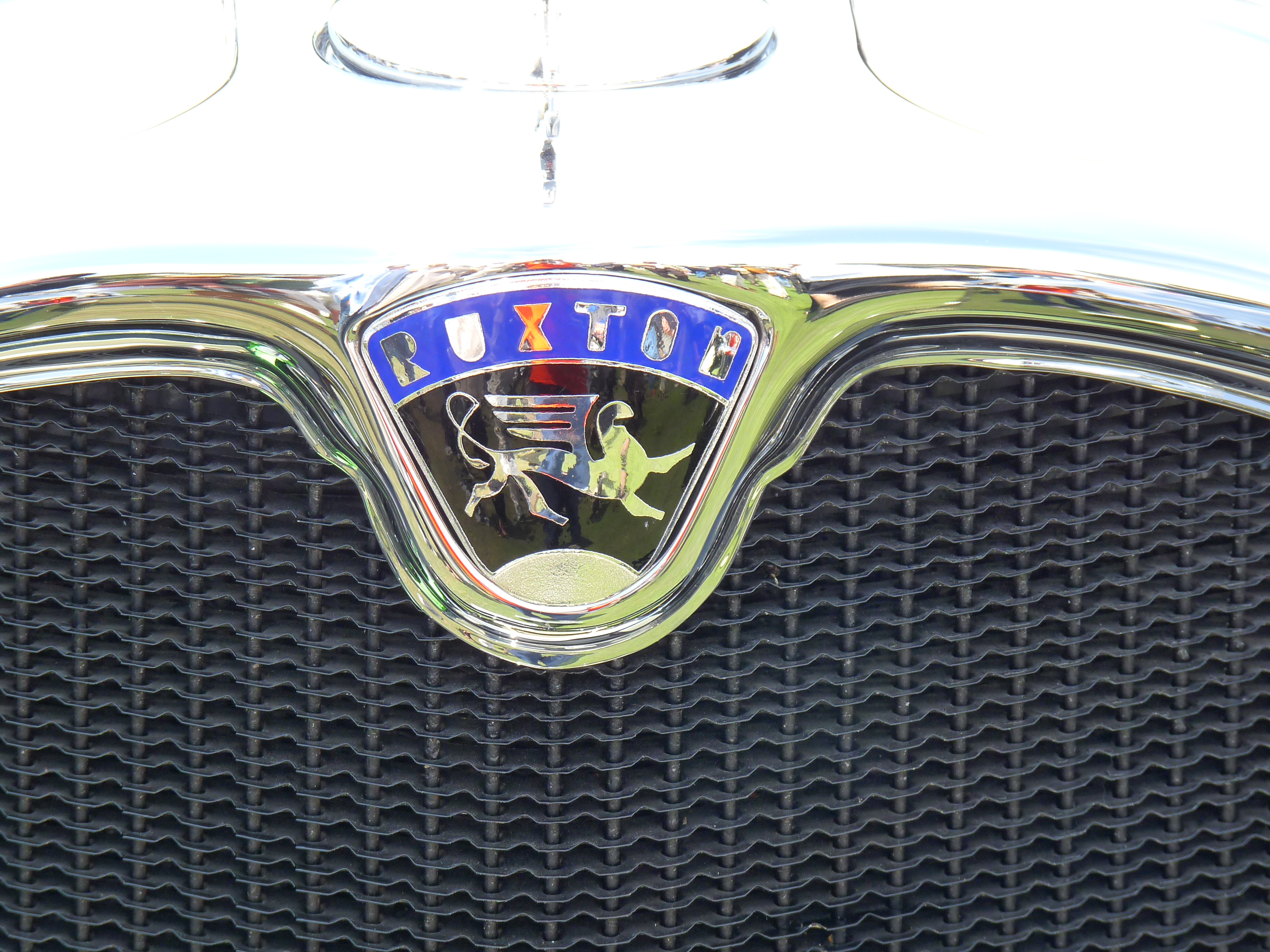
- 1930 Ruxton Model C emblem
- Industry: Automotive
- Founded: 1929; 97 years ago
- Founder: Archie M. Andrews, William J. Muller
- Defunct: 1931; 95 years ago
- Fate: Ceased production
- Headquarters: New York City, New York, United States
- Key people: William T. Muller, Joseph V. Ledwinka, Archie M. Andrews
- Products: Automobiles
- Production output: 96 (1929–1931)
- Brands: Ruxton

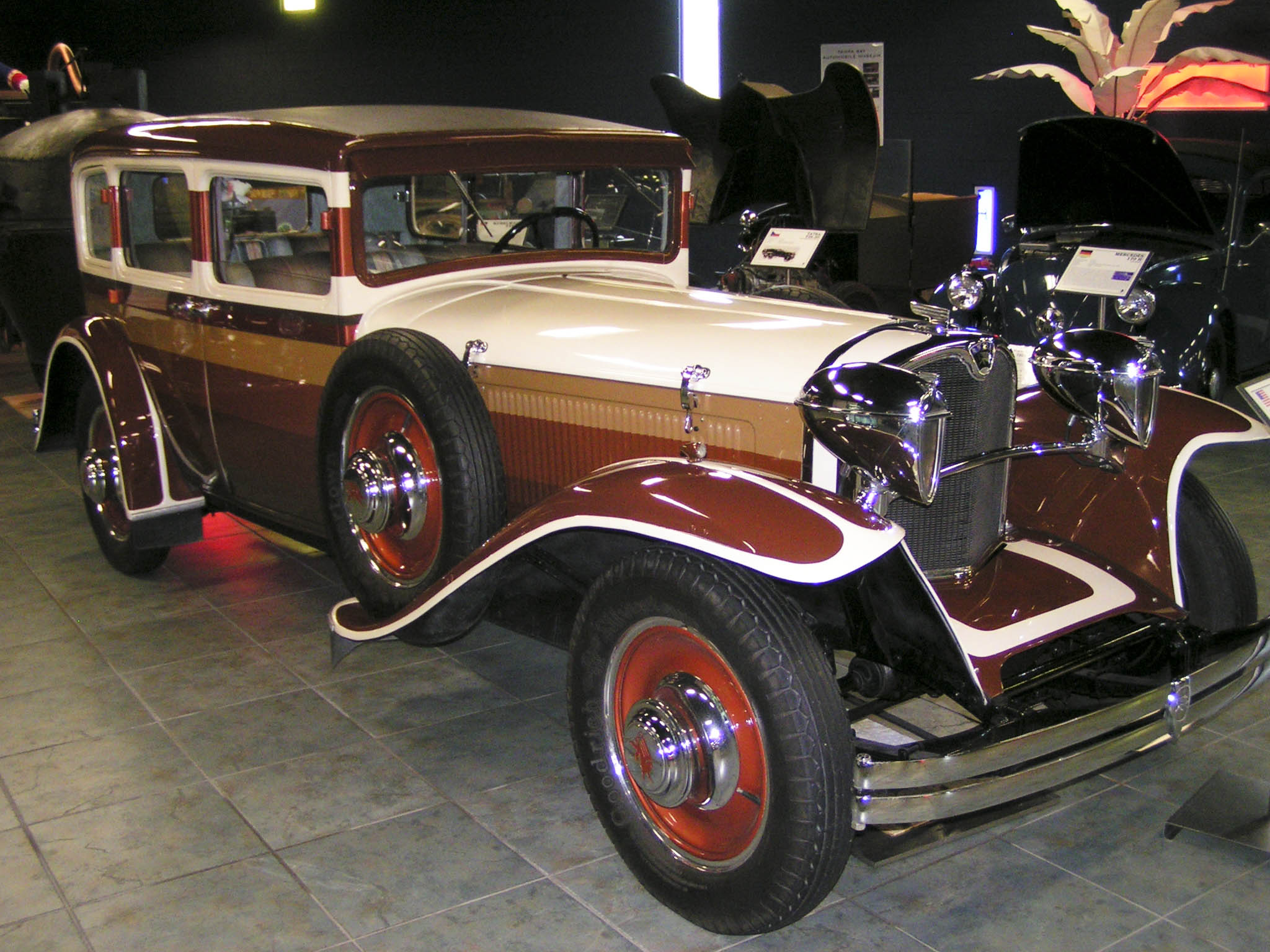
1929 Ruxton Model C - Joseph Urban colors

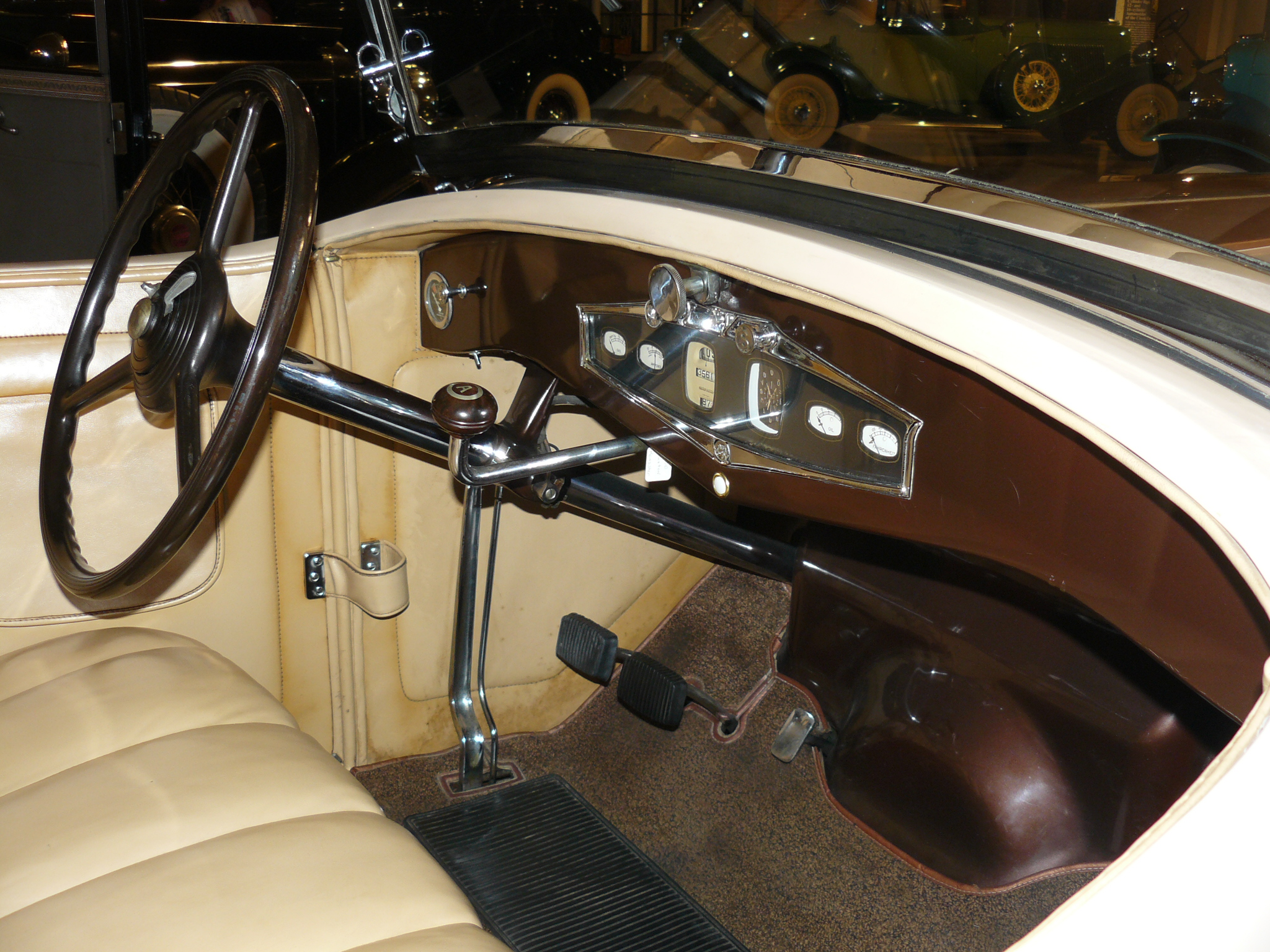
1930 Ruxton Model C Interior

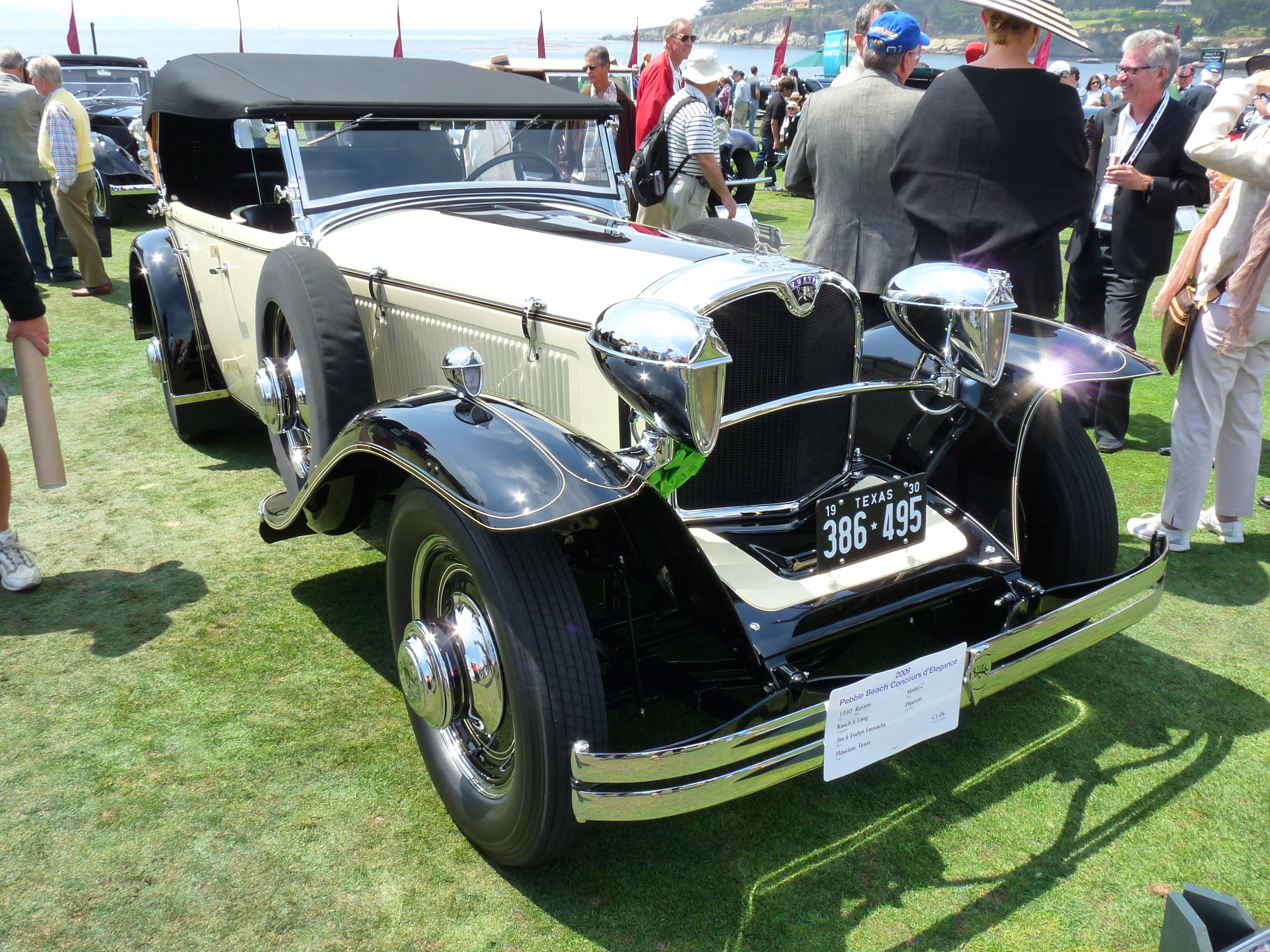
1930 Ruxton Model C Rauch & Lang Phaeton

The Ruxton was a front-wheel drive automobile produced by the New Era Motors Company of New York, New York, United States, during 1929 and 1930. The car was the brainchild of William Muller and was built in the Board Machine plant in Philadelphia, Moon Motor Car factory in St. Louis, Missouri, and Kissel Motors of Hartford, Wisconsin, who also produced the car's transmission unit.

== A car designed to sell to an automotive company ==
While employed in the engineering department of the Budd Body Company of Philadelphia, Pennsylvania, Muller convinced his employer to invest in developing a front wheel drive prototype automobile. Budd would then sell the rights to the car to an automotive company which would contract with Budd for the body work. While Muller designed the drive train, Joseph Ledwinka designed the body for the car and the project was completed in 1928, and the engines were provided by Continental Motors, Inc.

In an era when the American automobile had an average height of 6 feet (1,800 mm) from the ground to the level plane of the roof, Muller’s car was only 53 inches (1,300 mm) high, a feat accomplished by eliminating the drive shaft to the rear wheels. Ledwinka accentuated the lowness to ground through the elimination of the running boards.

Instead of attracting an automotive producer, Muller’s concept car attracted the attention of Archie Andrews, a member of Budd’s Board who also sat on the Board of Hupp Motor Car Company. Andrews recognized the possibilities of producing the car and made it possible for Muller and Budd to present the idea to Hupp.

When Hupp Motor Car Company passed on the car, Andrews took on the project himself, and with Muller formed New Era Motors which would market the car. Still, Andrews lacked an ability to build the car, and hoped-for support from Peerless, Gardner, and Marmon failed to materialize.

== Moon, Kissel, Ruxton Connection ==
In November 1929, Moon Motors of St. Louis, Missouri, reached an agreement to build the car, which Andrews had by then named the Ruxton, after William V. C. Ruxton, an investor Andrews hoped would support the project; Ruxton did not support the project, but it bore his name whether he wanted it to or not. Ultimately, Ruxton sued Andrews simply for the purpose of stating that he in no way supported Andrews or the car itself.

Unhappy with Moon's attention to the project, Andrews attempted to take over controlling interest in the company by buying up its stock. Ultimately, Andrews assumed control of the moribund company, much to the chagrin of its President C.W. Burst, who barricaded himself in the company headquarters in protest.

Despite lawsuits and counter suits, the Ruxton went into regular production in June 1930.

When Ruxton finally went on sale, some models sported Joseph Urban color schemes designed to lengthen the appearance of the car through broad bands of white intermixed with vivid colors such as blue, lavender, and navy blue . Many, but not all, Ruxtons featured the cat-like Woodlite headlights; while sleek, their performance paled in comparison to normal headlights. Most Ruxton owners soon learned that they either drove their cars during the daylight, or had them retrofitted with normal headlights or auxiliary driving lights.

Andrews also entered into a deal with Kissel of Hartford, Wisconsin, to build the transmissions and drive lines. With Moon failing, Andrews turned to Kissel to build the cars, and while the project appeared to be on course, again Andrews grew impatient and started buying Kissel stock in preparation for another take over. Unlike Moon, which tried to fight off Andrews, the Kissel Brothers rebelled by filing for receivership in November 1930, and production of the Ruxton came to an abrupt end less than four months after it was introduced.

== After effects ==
After the Ruxton debacle, Andrews set his sights on rescuing Hupp, whether it wanted to be rescued or not. While he was able to seize control of the company, his tenure was short and Andrews was removed by angry shareholders. He died in 1938.

Moon Motors' legal entanglements continued through the courts until 1965, at which time 355 creditors held claim to the remaining assets of $26,000.

Kissel emerged from its receivership as the Kissel Manufacturing Company and later was merged into the West Bend Aluminum Company.

With a total production of some 96 vehicles, the Ruxton is recognized as a Classic Car by the Classic Car Club of America.

== See also ==
- Joseph Ledwinka
