= Paul Revere (disambiguation) =

Paul Revere (1734–1818) was an American activist and artisan.

Paul Revere may also refer to:

- Paul Revere (musician) (1938–2014), American musician in Paul Revere & the Raiders
- Paul Revere (lawyer), American lawyer, writer and public speaker,
- Paul Revere Braniff (1897–1954), airline entrepreneur
- "Paul Revere" (song), a 1986 song by the Beastie Boys
- "Paul Revere", a song by Johnny Cash from the 1972 album America: A 200-Year Salute in Story and Song
- Paul Revere of Texas, a sobriquet given to people during the Texas Revolution for alerting settlers about Mexican troop movements
- Paul Revere class, a two ship class of assault transports of the United States Navy, named for the lead ship of the class, USS Paul Revere (APA-248)
- Paul Joseph Revere (1832–1863), general in the Union Army during the American Civil War

== See also ==
- Paul Revere's Ride, historical event and poem describing it
- Revere (disambiguation)
- Paul Rivière, French resistance fighter (1912–1998)
