= Reverence =

Reverence may refer to:

- Reverence (emotion) a subjective response to something excellent in a personal way
- Reverence (attitude), the acknowledgement of the legitimacy of the power of one's superior or superiors

== Music ==
- Reverence (Faithless album), a 1996 trip-hop album by Faithless
- Reverence (Emperor album), a 1997 symphonic black metal album by Emperor
- Reverence (Richard Bona album), a 2001 jazz album by Richard Bona
- Reverence (Parkway Drive album), a 2018 metalcore album by Parkway Drive
- "Reverence" (song), a 1992 alternative rock song by The Jesus And Mary Chain

== Other uses ==
- Reverence (sculpture), an outdoor sculpture in Vermont
- Reverence (horse), a British champion Thoroughbred racehorse

== See also ==
- Revere (disambiguation)
- Reverend (disambiguation)
- Veneration, the act of honoring a saint, a person who has been identified as having a high degree of sanctity or holiness
