= Venerable (disambiguation) =

Venerable is an honorific style used in Christianity and Buddhism.

Venerable may also refer to:

- HMS Venerable, several Royal Navy ships
- Venerable (album), a 2011 album by KEN mode

== See also ==
- Veneration, the act of honoring a saint, a person who has been identified as having a high degree of sanctity or holiness
