= Revere High School =

Revere High School may refer to:

- Revere High School (Massachusetts)
- Revere High School (Ohio)
