= Classic Car Club of America =

Motor club in the United States

The Classic Car Club of America (CCCA) is an organization founded in 1952 with a goal of celebrating the automobiles of the prewar period. At the time, the vehicles covered by the club were considered too modern to be of any interest by such organizations as the Antique Automobile Club of America.

Currently, the CCCA membership vehicles are among the most valuable on the market.

== Definition of a Classic car ==
In the words of the CCCA:

"The Classic Car Club of America defines a Full Classic as a “Fine” or “Distinctive” automobile. American or foreign built, produced only between 1915 and 1948. Many factors come into play but, generally, a Classic was a high-priced, top end vehicle when new and was built in limited quantities. No "Mass produced" assembly line vehicles are considered Classics. Other factors, including higher engine displacement, custom bespoke coachwork and luxury accessories. Mechanical developments such as power brakes, power clutch, and “one-shot” or automatic lubrication systems, help determine whether a car is considered to be a Classic."

The CCCA is considered to have invented the term classic car, which was coined to describe the vehicles covered by the club's interest. While the term is nowadays used to describe any interesting old vehicle, many in the US consider it only properly used to describe vehicles considered eligible for the CCCA.

However, Los Angeles car buff and attorney Robert Gottlieb coined the term "classic car" in his 1951 Motor Trend columns, for the cars many people considered white elephants, then languishing on the back rows of used car lots in any city. Today, excluding "associate members," aka wives, the CCCA has only 2,500 members, about its membership in the 1970s.

In order to avoid ambiguity, the CCCA generally refers to classic cars that are eligible for the CCCA 'CCCA Full Classics', 'CCCA Classics', 'Full Classics', or just capitalizes them as 'Classics'.

The CCCA has a narrow focus, tending towards only the high-priced cars available in a limited time period. Racing cars and serious sports cars are not covered by the CCCA, either.

== Eligible vehicles ==
The Classic Car Club of America publishes an officially sanctioned list of makes and models: Approved CCCA Classic Cars. Some makes that are not very well represented in the club are accepted on a "Considered by application" basis. A Club member may petition to have a vehicle not listed in the Approved CCCA Classic Cars list approval and accepted. Such approval may be given if the car is one of a similar standard to vehicles already accepted into the club.

However, the CCCA's list of "Classics" is arbitrary, accepting all eight-cylinder Auburns, an assembled Buick/Hudson product, but not the non-Imperial Chrysler eights of the same era, which also featured full-pressure-oiled engines, hydraulic brakes, and overdrive beginning before the rest of the industry in 1934, and were arguably as attractive as the Auburn pre-Airflow models.

Cars manufactured prior to 1915 may be approved if they are nearly equivalent or basically identical to eligible vehicles manufactured in 1915 or later. Cars built after 1942 and up to 1948 are only accepted if they are nearly identical or fundamentally identical to prewar vehicles; while the club's emphasis is on pre-war vehicles, this acknowledges that many cars built immediately post-war were in fact identical to those available immediately before hostilities began.

On its website, the Classic Car Club of America maintains a list of Approved CCCA Classic Cars that are acknowledged CCCA Classics.

== Grand Classics ==
The CCCA's car shows and judged championships are known as Grand Classics and are held at various points throughout the US. About a half-dozen Grand Classics are held annually. While neither as large nor as glamorous as the largest Concours d'Elegance such as Pebble Beach they are prestigious events in their own right.

While many cars go to be entered into the competition, the Club encourages its members to bring their cars even if they are in no condition to win at the show.

Concours judging is based on a comparison of the car to its condition when new. If the car now is identical to its as-new condition (or indeed better, given the quality of modern restoration) then 100 points are awarded. These days, quite a few vehicles rate 100 points at the show.

Some alterations for safety purposes are permitted and do not cost judging points. Glass must be safety glass except in classes purely for unrestored, as-original cars. Many original vehicles from early in the period had only one tail light and stop light; fitting a second one is accepted as long as it looks period correct. Equipping a car built with only brakes on two wheels with brakes on the other two wheels is also permitted, as long it is done in keeping with the car's period.

== Caravans ==
The CCCA organizes annual driving tours under this name. Distances covered are often scenic and leisurely, with many stops at local attractions. These events could be as long as several weeks, or as short as 3 days depending on the focus of the tour.

== Complete car list ==
All vehicles below must be built between 1915 and 1948, unless specified otherwise.

- AC
- Adler (by application)
- Alfa Romeo
- Alvis (Speed 20, Speed 25, and 4.3 L)
- Amilcar (by application)
- Armstrong Siddeley (by application)
- Aston Martin (all 1927-39)
- Auburn (all 8- and 12-cylinder)
- Austro-Daimler
- Ballot (by application)
- Bentley
- Benz
- Blackhawk
- BMW (327/318, 327, 328, and 335)
- Brewster (all heart front)
- Brough-Superior (by application)
- Bucciali (TAV 8, TAV 30, TAV 12 and Double Huit)
- Bugatti (All except Type 52)
- Buick (1931-42 — 90 Series and 80 Limited)
- Cadillac (All V-12 and V-16; All 1925-35; 1936-48 — All 63, 65, 67, Cadillac Series 70, 72, 75, 80, 85, 90 Series; 1938-47 — 60 Special; 1940-47 — All Series 62)
- Chenard-Walcker (by application)
- Chrysler (1926-30 — Imperial 80, 1929 Imperial L; 1931-37 — Imperial Series CG, CH, CL, and CW Newports and Thunderbolts;1934 — CX; 1935 — C-3; 1936 — C-11; 1937-48 — Custom Imperial, Crown Imperial Series C-15, C-20, C-24, C-27, C-33, C-37, C-40)
- Cord
- Cunningham (Series V6, V7, V8, and V9 race cars built by Briggs Cunningham)
- Dagmar (6-80)
- Daimler (All 8- and 12-cylinder)
- Darracq (8-cylinder and 4-litre 6-cylinder)
- Delage (model D-8)
- Delahaye (Series 135, 145, 165)
- Delaunay Belleville (6-cylinder)
- Doble
- Dorris
- Duesenberg
- DuPont
- Excelsior (by application)
- Farman
- Fiat (by application)
- FN (by application)
- Franklin (All models except 1933-34 Olympic)
- Frazer-Nash (by application)
- Georges Irat
- Graham (1930-31 — Series 137)
- Graham-Paige (1929-30 — Series 837)
- Hispano-Suiza (All French models; Spanish models T56, T56BIS, T64)
- Horch
- Hotchkiss (by application)
- Hudson (1929 — Series L)
- Humber (by application)
- Invicta
- Isotta Fraschini
- Itala
- Jaguar (1946–48 — 2 1/2 L, 3 1/2 L (Mark IV))
- Jensen (by application)
- Jordan (Speedway Series Z, as well as 1929–31 Jordan 8, various model designations of G, 90 and Great Line 90)
- Julian
- Kissel (1925-26; 1927 — 8-75; 1928 — 8-90 and 8-90 White Eagle; 1929-31 8-126)
- Lagonda (All models except 1933-40 Rapier)
- Lanchester (by application)
- Lancia (by application)
- LaSalle (1927-33)
- Lincoln (All L, KA, KB, and K; 1941 — 168 H; 1942 — 268 H; All Lincoln Continentals)
- Lincoln Continental
- Locomobile (All models 48 and 90; 1927-29 — Model 8-80; 1929 — 8-88)
- Marmon (all 16-cylinder; 1925–26 — 74; 1927 — 75; 1928 — E75; 1930 — Big 8; 1931 — 88 and Big 8)
- Maserati (by application)
- Maybach
- McFarlan (TV6 and 8)
- Mercedes
- Mercedes-Benz (All 230 and up, as well as Benz models built prior to the merger, 1926-26 10/30 h.p., 16/50 h.p., and 16/50 h.p. Sport.; K., S., S.S., S.S.K., S.S.K.L.; Grosser and Mannheim)
- Mercer
- MG (1935-39 SA; 1938-39 WA)
- Minerva (All except 4-cylinder)
- N.A.G. (by application)
- Nash (1930 Series 490; 1931 Series 8-90; 1932 Series 9-90, Advanced 8 and Ambassador 8; 1933-34 Ambassador 8)
- Packard (All 12 cylinder; 1925–34 All 6- and 8-cylinder; 1935 Models 1200–1205, 1207 and 1208; 1936 Models 1400–1405, 1407 and 1408; 1937 Models 1500–1502, 1506–1508; 1938 Models 1603–1605, 1607 and 1608; 1939 Models 1703/5/7/8; 1940 Models 1803–1808; 1941 Models 1903–1908; 1942 Models 2023, 2003–2008, 2055; 1946-47 Models 2103, 2106 and 2126; All Darrin-bodied)
- Peerless (1925 Series 67; 1926 — 1928 Series 69; 1930-1 Custom 8;1932 Deluxe Custom 8)
- Peugeot (by application)
- Pierce-Arrow
- Railton (by application)
- Raymond Mays (by application)
- Renault (45 hp)
- REO (1931-4, all Royale 8-cylinder)
- ReVere
- Roamer (1925 8-88, 6-54e, 4-75 and 4-85e; 1926 4-75e, 4-85e and 8-88; 1927-29 8-88; 1929-30 8-120)
- Rochet-Schneider (by application)
- Rohr (by application)
- Rolls-Royce
- Ruxton
- Squire
- S.S. Jaguar (1932-40 S.S. 1, S.S. 90, SS Jaguar and SS Jaguar 100)
- Stearns-Knight
- Stevens-Duryea
- Steyr (by application)
- Studebaker (1928 — 8, FA and FB President, 1929-33 President except Model 82)
- Stutz
- Sunbeam (8-cylinder and 3 L twin cam)
- Talbot (105C and 110C)
- Talbot-Lago (150C)
- Tatra (by application)
- Triumph (Dolomite 8 and Gloria 6)
- Vauxhall (25-70 and 30-98)
- Voisin
- Wills Sainte Claire
- Willys-Knight (Custom bodied only, considered by application)
