= Joseph Ledwinka =

American engineer (1870–1949)

- Born: Joseph V. Ledwinka; December 14, 1870; Vienna, Austria
- Died: November 26, 1949 (aged 78); Philadelphia, Pennsylvania
- Occupation: Automotive engineer
- Employer: Edward G. Budd Manufacturing Company
- Spouse: Laura B. Leidy (m. 1906)

Joseph V. Ledwinka (December 14, 1870 – November 26, 1949) was an automobile engineer.

== Early life ==
Joseph V. Ledwinka, a distant relative of Hans Ledwinka, was born in Vienna, and emigrated to the United States in 1896.

== Career ==
Ledwinka was employed in his first job as carriage trimmer (upholsterer) at the Chicago Coach and Carriage Company where he developed his first patented design for a four-wheel-drive electric vehicle with four-wheel brakes, several of which were built by Westinghouse. Later he became a chief engineer for the Chattanooga Railroad of Tennessee, where he designed special drives for electric trolley cars. Coming to Philadelphia in 1910, he started working with Edward G. Budd for the Hale & Kilburn company where they pioneered the pressed-steel car body paneling manufacturing process starting in 1909. In 1912, they established their own factory, the Edward G. Budd Manufacturing Company, in Philadelphia where they formed automobile panels by drop pressing and power hammering later followed by drawing and stretching of panels. He worked as the chief engineer. They supplied body parts to Dodge. In 1923, André Citroën took up the Budd license for his all-steel B12 model. In 1929, Ledwinka designed the front-wheel drive Ruxton car. In the 1930s Ledwinka was involved in the design of Chrysler Airflow body and worked with Ferdinand Porsche on the early VW prototypes. He retired from Edward G. Budd Manufacturing Co. in 1942 and remained as a consulting engineer until his death. Ledwinka was an author of over 300 technical patents relating to automobile design.

== Personal life ==
Ledwinka's first wife died in the summer of 1905. He married Laura B. Leidy in 1906. He had four stepsons. He was a member of the Society of Automotive Engineers and the Franklin Institute.

== Death ==
Ledwinka died on November 26, 1949, at Presbyterian Hospital in Philadelphia.

== See also ==
- Hans Ledwinka
- Edward G. Budd
