= List of U.S. executive branch czars =

High-level officials who oversee a particular policy

In the United States, the informal term "czar" (or, less often, "tsar") is employed in media and popular usage to refer to high-level executive branch officials who oversee a particular policy field. The earliest known use of the term for a U.S. government official was in the administration of Franklin Roosevelt (1933–1945), during which eleven unique positions (or twelve if one were to count "economic czar" and "economic czar of World War II" as distinct) were so described.

The list of those identified as czars is based on subjective judgments, as individuals or offices may be referred to with the nickname by some publications or public figures, while not by others. A more limited (though no less subjective) definition of the term would encompass only those officials appointed without Senate confirmation.

== By administration ==
Summary table
President	Party	In office	Number of czar titles	Number of appointees	Appointees not confirmed by Senate
Franklin D. Roosevelt	Democratic	1933–1945	11	19	18
Harry S. Truman	Democratic	1945–1953	6		5
Dwight D. Eisenhower	Republican	1953–1961	1		0
Lyndon B. Johnson	Democratic	1963–1969	3		1
Richard Nixon	Republican	1969–1974	3	5	
Gerald Ford	Republican	1974–1977	2		
Jimmy Carter	Democratic	1977–1981	2	3	2
Ronald Reagan	Republican	1981–1989	1		
George H. W. Bush	Republican	1989–1993	2	3	0
Bill Clinton	Democratic	1993–2001	8	11	7
George W. Bush	Republican	2001–2009	33	49	28
Barack Obama	Democratic	2009–2017	38	50	39
Donald Trump	Republican	2017–2021; 2025–present	7	8	7
Joe Biden	Democratic	2021–2025	4	7	4

The numbers are based upon the sortable list below, which includes further details and references.

Note that the holders of certain official positions have been referred to as "czars" for only part of the time those positions have existed. For example, there has been an Assistant Secretary of Labor for Mine Safety and Health since the passage of the Mine Safety and Health Act of 1977, but the phrase "mine safety czar" has been applied to the position only since the appointment of Richard Stickler to the post in 2006. Similarly, there has been a director of the Office of Information and Regulatory Affairs since the office was created by the Paperwork Reduction Act of 1980, but the term "regulatory czar" was not applied to the post until 2001.

== List of executive branch czars ==
The following are executive branch officials who have been described by the media as a czar of some kind.

Czar title	Official title	Office holder	Tenure	Type of appointment	Appointing administration	Senate confirmed
AI czar	Director of National Intelligence	Jay Clayton	2026	President appointed	Donald Trump	
AI and crypto czar	White House AI and Crypto Czar	David Sacks	2025–2026	President appointed	Donald Trump	
AfPak czar, Afghanistan and Pakistan czar	Special Representative for Afghanistan and Pakistan	Richard Holbrooke	2009–2010	President appointed	Barack Obama	
AIDS czar	National AIDS Policy Coordinator, Member of White House Domestic Policy Council	Kristine Gebbie	1993–1994	President appointed	Bill Clinton	
AIDS czar	Director of the Office of National AIDS Policy	Patricia Fleming	1993–1997	President appointed	Bill Clinton	
AIDS czar	Director of the Office of National AIDS Policy, Presidential Envoy for AIDS Cooperation	Sandra Thurman	1997–2000	President appointed	Bill Clinton	
AIDS czar	Director of the Office of National AIDS Policy	Scott Evertz	2001–2002	President appointed	George W. Bush	
AIDS czar	Director of the Office of National AIDS Policy	Joe O'Neill	2002–2003	President appointed	George W. Bush	
AIDS czar	Director of the Office of National AIDS Policy	Carol Thompson	2004–2006	President appointed	George W. Bush	
AIDS czar	Director of the Office of National AIDS Policy	Jeffrey Crowley	2009–2012	President appointed	Barack Obama	
AIDS czar	Director of the Office of National AIDS Policy	Grant Colfax	2012–2014	President appointed	Barack Obama	
AIDS czar	Director of the Office of National AIDS Policy	Douglas Brooks	2014–2016	President appointed	Barack Obama	
anti-poverty czar, poverty czar	Director of Office of Economic Opportunity	Sargent Shriver	1965–1969	President nominated, Senate confirmed	Lyndon Johnson	✓
Asian Carp czar	Asian Carp Director, Council on Environmental Quality	John Goss	2010–Unknown	Council on Environmental Quality selected	Barack Obama	
auto czar, car czar	Treasury Advisor, Head of the Auto Task Force	Steve Rattner	2009 Feb–Jul	Sec. of Treasury appointed	Barack Obama	
auto czar, car czar	Senior Advisor President's Automotive Task Force	Ron Bloom	2009–2011	President appointed	Barack Obama	
auto recovery czar, autoworker czar	Member Presidential Task Force on the Auto Industry, Director of Recovery for Auto Communities and Workers	Edward B. Montgomery	2009–Unknown	President appointed	Barack Obama	
bank bailout czar, Troubled Asset Relief Program (TARP) czar	United States Assistant Secretary of the Treasury for Financial Stability, Senior Advisor to Secretary of the Treasury	Neel Kashkari	2008–2009	(New position), President nominated, Senate confirmed	George W. Bush	✓
bank bailout czar, TARP czar	United States Assistant Secretary of the Treasury for Financial Stability	Herb Allison	2009–2013	President nominated, Senate confirmed	Barack Obama	✓
bioethics czar	Advisor to the President, Chairman of The President's Council on Bioethics	Leon Kass	2001–2005	(New position), Exec order, President appointed	George W. Bush	
bird flu czar	Assistant Secretary of Health and Human Services, Advisor to the President for Public Health Emergency Preparedness	Stewart Simonson	2004–2006	(New position), President appointed	George W. Bush	
birth control czar	Deputy Assistant Secretary of Population Affairs, Department of Health and Human Services	Eric Keroack	2006–2007	President appointed	George W. Bush	
border czar	U.S. attorney and Special Representative for the Southwest Border, Department of Justice	Alan Bersin	1995–1998	President nominated, Senate confirmed as U.S. Attorney, Appointed as Special Representative	Bill Clinton	✓
border czar	Assistant Secretary for International Affairs, Special Representative for Border Affairs, Dept of Homeland Security	Alan Bersin	2009–2011	Sec of Homeland Security appointed	Barack Obama	
border czar	Special Assistant to the President and Coordinator for the Southern Border	Roberta S. Jacobson	2021 Jan–Apr	President appointed	Joe Biden	
border czar	Border Czar	Thomas Homan	2019 (Note: In 2019, a "border czar" was named, but never formally appointed.)/2025–present (Note: Trump appointed Homan as the border czar for his second administration as well.)	President appointed	Donald Trump	
budget czar	Director of the Office of Management and Budget	Mitch Daniels	2001–2003	President nominated, Senate confirmed	George W. Bush	✓
budget czar	Director of the Office of Management and Budget	Josh Bolten	2003–2006	President nominated, Senate confirmed	George W. Bush	✓
budget czar	Director of the Office of Management and Budget	Rob Portman	2006–2007	President nominated, Senate confirmed	George W. Bush	✓
car czar	Chief domestic policy advisor and Director of the White House Domestic Policy Council	Bruce Reed	1993–2001	(New position), Exec order, President appointed	Bill Clinton	
czar of censorship	Director, Office of Censorship	Byron Price	1941–1945	Exec Order, President appointed	Franklin Roosevelt	
cleanup czar	Special Assistant Attorney General (to investigate corruption)	Newbold Morris	1952, fired after 63 days by Attorney General (AG) for demanding records access; AG then forced to resign by President Truman	Attorney General appointed	Harry Truman	
cleanup czar	Assistant Secretary for Environmental Management, Department of Energy (nuclear cleanup)	Jessie Roberson	2001–2004	President nominated, Senate confirmed	George W. Bush	✓
cleanup czar	Assistant Secretary for Environmental Management, Department of Energy (nuclear cleanup)	James Rispoli	2005–2008	Sec. of Energy appointed, Senate confirmed	George W. Bush	✓
climate czar	Assistant to the President and Staff Secretary, President's Coordinator for Climate Change, Senior negotiator at Kyoto and Beuenos Aires negotiations	Todd Stern	1997–1999	President appointed	Bill Clinton	
climate czar	Special Envoy for Climate Change	Todd Stern	2009	Sec. of State appointed	Barack Obama	
climate czar, energy czar, global warming czar	Assistant to the President for Energy and Climate Change	Carol Browner	2009–2011	(New position)	Barack Obama	
copyright czar	Intellectual Property Enforcement Coordinator	vacant; position approved but not filled during Bush administration	2008–2009	(New position)	George W. Bush	
copyright czar	Intellectual Property Enforcement Coordinator	Victoria Espinel	2009–2013	(first at position)	Barack Obama	
communications czar	Counselor to the President, Special counselor to the President	Dan Bartlett	2005–2007	President appointed	George W. Bush	
compensation czar, Gulf claims czar, pay czar	Special Master for TARP Executive Compensation	Kenneth Feinberg	2009–2011, 2014–2016?	Sec. of Treasury appointed	Barack Obama	
consumer czar	Special Advisor for the Consumer Financial Protection Bureau	Elizabeth Warren	2010–2011	(New position), President appointed	Barack Obama	
COVID-19 czar	Counselor to the President of the United States	Jeff Zients	2021–2022	President appointed	Joe Biden	
COVID-19 czar	White House COVID-19 response coordinator	Ashish Jha	2022–2023	President appointed	Joe Biden	
cruise czar	Fact-Finding Officer for the Federal Maritime Commission	Louis E. Sola	2020–2023	President nominated, Senate confirmed	Donald Trump	
cyber security czar, cyber czar	Special Advisor to the President on Cybersecurity, Office of Management and Budget (OMB)	Richard A. Clarke	2001 Oct – 2003 Feb	(New position), President appointed	George W. Bush	
cyber security czar, cyber czar	Director, National Cybersecurity Center	Rod Beckstrom	2008–2009	(New position), Presidential directive, President appointed	George W. Bush	
cyber security czar, cyber czar	Director of the White House Office of Cybersecurity, Cybersecurity Coordinator	Melissa Hathaway	2009 May–Jul, Acting czar	Office created May 31, 2009.	Barack Obama	
cyber security czar, cyber czar	Director of the White House Office of Cybersecurity, Cybersecurity Coordinator	Tom Bossert	2017–2018	Office created May 31, 2009.	Donald Trump	
cyber security czar, cyber czar	Director of the White House Office of Cybersecurity, Cybersecurity Coordinator	Robert Joyce	2018	Office created May 31, 2009.	Donald Trump	
democracy czar	Deputy National Security Advisor for Global Democracy Strategy	Elliott Abrams	2005–2008	President appointed	George W. Bush	
domestic czar	Special Assistant to the President, domestic policy aide	Joseph Califano	1965–1969	President appointed	Lyndon Johnson	
domestic policy czar	Chief Domestic Policy Coordinator, Assistant to the President and Senior Advisor to the President, White House Deputy Chief of Staff	Karl Rove	2004–2006	President appointed	George W. Bush	
domestic violence czar	Advisor to the President and the Vice President on Domestic Violence and Sexual Assault Issues	Lynn Rosenthal	2009	Vice President appointed	Barack Obama	
drug czar	Head of Drug programs, Special Action Office of Drug Abuse Prevention	Jerome Jaffe	1971	President appointed	Richard Nixon	
drug czar	Director of the National Institute on Drug Abuse and head of the Narcotics Treatment Administration	Robert DuPont	1973–1978		Gerald Ford	
drug czar	Director of the White House Drug Abuse Policy (1982), Special Assistant to the President for Drug Abuse (1983), Member of Executive Board of the National Narcotics Border Interdiction System Cabinet Level (1983), Deputy Assistant to the President for Drug Abuse Policy (1985)	Carlton Turner	1982–1988	(New position), Exec order, President appointed	Ronald Reagan	
drug czar	Director, Office of National Drug Control Policy	William Bennett	1989–1990	(New position) created by Congress, President nominated, Senate confirmed	George H. W. Bush	✓
drug czar	Director, Office of National Drug Control Policy	Bob Martinez	1991–1993	President nominated, Senate confirmed	George H. W. Bush	✓
drug czar	Director, National Drug Control Policy	Lee P. Brown	1993–1995	President nominated, Senate confirmed	Bill Clinton	✓
drug czar	Director, National Drug Control Policy	Barry McCaffrey	1996–2001	President nominated, Senate confirmed	Bill Clinton	✓
drug czar	Director, National Drug Control Policy	John P. Walters	2001–2009	President nominated, Senate confirmed	George W. Bush	✓
drug czar	Director, National Drug Control Policy (cabinet rank removed)	Gil Kerlikowske	2009–2014	President nominated, Senate confirmed	Barack Obama	✓
drug czar	Director, National Drug Control Policy	Michael Botticelli	2015–2017	President nominated, Senate confirmed	Barack Obama	✓
Ebola czar	Ebola Response Coordinator	Ron Klain	2014–2015	President appointed	Barack Obama	
e-commerce czar, e-czar	Executive Director, Electronic Commerce Working Group	Elizabeth Echols	1998–2000	Vice President appointed	Bill Clinton	✓
economic czar, economic czar of World War II	Director, Office of Economic Stabilization	James F. Byrnes	1942–1943	(New position), Exec order, President appointed	Franklin Roosevelt	
economic czar	Director, Office of Economic Stabilization	Fred M. Vinson	1943–1945	President appointed	Franklin Roosevelt	
economic czar	Director, Office of Economic Stabilization	William Hammatt Davis	1945–1946	President appointed	Franklin Roosevelt	
economic czar, big-picture economic czar	Chairman, Economic Recovery Advisory Board	Paul A. Volcker	2009	President appointed	Barack Obama	
energy czar	Director of the Energy Policy Office	John Arthur Love	1973	(New position), Exec order, President appointed	Richard Nixon	
energy czar	Federal Energy Office Administrator	William E. Simon	1973–1974	President appointed	Richard Nixon	
energy czar	Administrator, Federal Energy Administration	John Sawhill	1974	President appointed	Richard Nixon	
energy czar	Administrator, Federal Energy Administration, Assistant to the President for Energy Affairs, Executive Director of Energy Resources Council	Frank Zarb	1974–1977	President appointed	Gerald Ford	
energy czar	Director, Department of Energy (cabinet-level position)	James Schlesinger	1977–1979	(New position), Legislation enacted, President nominated, Senate confirmed	Jimmy Carter	✓
ethics czar, transparency czar	Special Counsel to the President for Ethics and Government Reform	Norm Eisen	2009–2010	(New position), Exec order, President appointed	Barack Obama	
ethics czar, transparency czar	White House Counsel	Robert Bauer	2010–2011	President appointed	Barack Obama	
faith-based czar, faith czar	Director, White House Office of Faith-Based and Community Initiatives	John DiIulio	2001–2002	(New position), Exec order, President appointed	George W. Bush	
faith-based czar, faith czar	Director, White House Office of Faith-Based and Community Initiatives	Jim Towey	2002–2006	President appointed	George W. Bush	
faith-based czar, faith czar	Director, White House Office of Faith-Based and Community Initiatives	Jay Hein	2006–2008	President appointed	George W. Bush	
faith-based czar	Director of the White House Office of Faith-Based and Neighborhood Partnerships	Joshua DuBois	2009–2013	President appointed	Barack Obama	
faith-based czar	Director of the White House Office of Faith-Based and Neighborhood Partnerships	Melissa Rogers	2013–2014?	President appointed	Barack Obama	
food czar	Food Administrator and Secretary of Agriculture	Claude Wickard	1942–1943	Exec order	Franklin Roosevelt	
food czar	War Food Administrator	Chester C. Davis	1943	Exec order	Franklin Roosevelt	
food czar	War Food Administrator	John Marvin Jones	1943–1945	Exec order	Franklin Roosevelt	
food czar	Chairman Citizens Food Committee	Charles Luckman	1947 Sep–Nov	President appointed	Harry Truman	
food safety czar	Assistant Commissioner for Food Protection	David W. K. Acheson	2007–2008	President appointed	George W. Bush	
foreign aid czar	Administrator of the US Agency for International Development (USAID)	Randall Tobias	2006–2007	President nominated, Senate confirmed	George W. Bush	✓
global AIDS czar	Coordinator of U.S. Government Activities to Combat HIV/AIDS Globally with the rank of Ambassador	Randall Tobias	2003–2006	(New position), President nominated, Senate confirmed	George W. Bush	✓
global AIDS czar	Coordinator of U.S.Government Activities to Combat HIV/AIDS Globally, with the rank of Ambassador	Mark Dybul	2006–2009	President nominated, Senate confirmed	George W. Bush	✓
Great Lakes czar	Senior Advisor to the EPA Administrator	Cameron Davis	2009–2017	(New position)	Barack Obama	
green-jobs czar	Special Advisor for Green Jobs, Enterprise, and Innovation at the White House, Member of the White House Council on Environmental Quality	Van Jones	2009 Apr–Sep	President appointed	Barack Obama	
Guantanamo Base closure czar	US Department of State Special Envoy	Daniel Fried	2009–2013	Sec. of State appointed	Barack Obama	
health care czar, technology czar, internet czar, e-czar	Senior Advisor for Policy Development	Ira Magaziner	1993–1998	President appointed	Bill Clinton	
health czar	Director of the White House Office of Health Reform and Counselor to the President	Nancy-Ann DeParle	2009–2011	Exec Order	Barack Obama	
health czar for the World Trade Center (WTC)	Special coordinator to respond to health effects of September 11 attacks, World Trade Center (WTC) Medical Monitoring and Treatment Program, also served as Director, National Institute for Occupational Safety and Health	John Howard	2006–2008	President Appointed	George W. Bush	
health IT czar	National Coordinator for Health Information Technology, Department of Health and Human Services (HHS)	David Brailer	2004–2006	(New position), Exec order, appointed by Sec. of HHS	George W. Bush	
health IT czar	National Coordinator for Health Information Technology, Department of Health and Human Services (HHS)	David Blumenthal	2009–2011	Exec order, appointed by Sec. of HHS	Barack Obama	
homeland security czar	Assistant to the President for Homeland Security and Counterterrorism	Tom Ridge	2001–2002	(New position), Exec Order, President appointed	George W. Bush	
homeland security czar	Secretary, U.S. Department of Homeland Security	Tom Ridge	2003–2004	(New position), Legislation enacted, President nominated, Senate confirmed	George W. Bush	✓
homeland security czar	Secretary, U.S. Department of Homeland Security	Michael Chertoff	2005–2009	President nominated, Senate confirmed	George W. Bush	✓
homeless czar, homelessness czar	Executive Director, United States Interagency Council on Homelessness	Phil Mangano	2002–2008	President appointed	George W. Bush	
housing czar	Housing Expediter in the Office of War Mobilization and Reconversion	Wilson Wyatt	1945–1946	(New position), President appointed	Harry Truman	
human trafficking czar	Special Advisor in the Office of Domestic Policy Council	Heather Fischer	2020	(New position), President appointed	Donald Trump	
Gulf Coast reconstruction czar, Hurricane Katrina recovery czar	Federal Coordinator of Hurricane Katrina Recovery Effort	Donald E. Powell	2005–2008	President appointed	George W. Bush	
inflation czar, anti-inflation czar	Special Trade Representative, Chief U.S. trade negotiator	Robert S. Strauss	1978	President appointed	Jimmy Carter	
inflation czar	Advisor to the President, Chairman Council on Wage and Price Stability	Alfred E. Kahn	1977–1980	President appointed	Jimmy Carter	
czar of information	Director, Office of War Information	Elmer Davis	1942–1945	Exec Order, President appointed	Franklin Roosevelt	
information czar, Infotech Czar	Chief Information Officer at the White House	Vivek Kundra	2009–2011	(New position), created by statute, President appointed	Barack Obama	
information czar, Infotech Czar	Chief Information Officer at the White House	Steven VanRoekel	2011–2014	created by statute, President appointed	Barack Obama	
intelligence czar	Director of National Intelligence	John Negroponte	2005–2007	(New position), Congress mandated, President nominated, Senate confirmed	George W. Bush	✓
intelligence czar	Director of National Intelligence	John Michael McConnell	2007–2009	President nominated, Senate confirmed	George W. Bush	✓
intelligence czar	Director of National Intelligence	Dennis C. Blair	2009–2010	President nominated, Senate confirmed	Barack Obama	✓
intelligence czar	Director of National Intelligence	James R. Clapper	2010–2017	President nominated, Senate confirmed	Barack Obama	✓
Iran czar	Special Advisor for the Persian Gulf and Southwest Asia (which includes Iran)	Dennis Ross	2009–2011	President appointed	Barack Obama	
czar of Latin American affairs	Assistant Secretary of State for Inter-American Affairs	Thomas C. Mann	1964–1965	President nominated, Senate confirmed	Lyndon Johnson	✓
manpower czar	Director, War Manpower Commission	Paul V. McNutt	1942–1945	Exec order	Franklin Roosevelt	
manufacturing czar	Assistant Secretary for manufacturing and services, U.S. Commerce Department	Albert Frink	2004–2007	(New position), President nominated, Senate confirmed	George W. Bush	✓
manufacturing czar	Assistant Secretary of Commerce for Manufacturing and Services	William G. Sutton	2007–2008	President nominated, Senate confirmed	George W. Bush	✓
manufacturing czar	Senior Counselor for Manufacturing Policy	Ron Bloom	2009–2011	President appointed	Barack Obama	
Middle East czar	Special Envoy for Middle East Peace	George J. Mitchell	2009–2011	Sec. of State appointed	Barack Obama	
mine safety czar	Assistant Secretary of Labor for Mine Safety and Health	Richard Stickler	2006–2008	Recess appointment—2 prior presidential nominations were rejected by the Senate	George W. Bush	
missile czar	Assistant Secretary of the Air Force for Research and Development	Trevor Gardner	1954–1956	Sec. of Defense appointed, Senate confirmed	Dwight D. Eisenhower	✓
mobilization czar, civilian economy czar	Director, Office of Defense Mobilization	Charles Edward Wilson	1950–1952	(New position), Exec order	Harry Truman	
oil czar	Petroleum Coordinator for National Defense, Secretary of the Interior	Harold L. Ickes	1941–1946	President nominated, Senate confirmed as Sec. of Interior	Franklin Roosevelt	✓
pardon czar	Pardon Czar	Alice Marie Johnson	2025–present	President appointed	Donald Trump	✓
patronage czar	Postmaster General Post Office Department, Cabinet-level position	Robert E. Hannegan	1945–1947	President nominated, Senate confirmed	Harry Truman	✓
performance czar	United States Chief Performance Officer and Deputy Director for Management at the Office of Management and Budget	Jeffrey Zients	2009–2013	President nominated, Senate confirmed	Barack Obama	✓
policy czar	Assistant to the President for Policy and Strategic Planning	Michael Gerson	2005–2006	President appointed	George W. Bush	
price czar	Administrator, Office of Price Administration	Leon Henderson	1941–1942	(New position), Exec order, President appointed	Franklin Roosevelt	
price czar	Administrator, Office of Price Administration	Prentiss M. Brown	1942–1943	President appointed	Franklin Roosevelt	
price czar	Administrator, Office of Price Administration	Chester Bowles	1943–1946	President appointed	Franklin Roosevelt	
price czar	Chairman of the Price Commission	Grayson Jackson	1971	(New position), President appointed	Richard Nixon	
production czar	Director, War Production Board	Donald M. Nelson	1942–1944	(New position), Exec order, President appointed	Franklin Roosevelt	
production czar	Director, War Production Board	Julius A. Krug	1944–1945	President appointed	Franklin Roosevelt	
public diplomacy czar	Special advisor to the President, Undersecretary of State for Public Diplomacy and Public Affairs	Karen Hughes	2005–2007	President nominated, Senate confirmed	George W. Bush	✓
public diplomacy czar	Undersecretary of State for Public Affairs and Public Diplomacy	James Glassman	2008–2009	President nominated, Senate confirmed	George W. Bush	✓
reading czar	President's Advisor on Reading First Initiative, Member of the President's Commission on Excellence in Special Education	Reid Lyon	2001–2005	President appointed	George W. Bush	
reconversion czar	Director of War Mobilization and Reconversion	John W. Snyder	1945–1946	President appointed	Harry Truman	
regulatory czar	Director of the Office of Information and Regulatory Affairs Office of Management and Budget	John Graham	2001–2006	President nominated, Senate confirmed	George W. Bush	✓
regulatory czar	Director of the Office of Information and Regulatory Affairs Office of Management and Budget	Susan Dudley	2006–2009	Recess appointment, nominee did not receive a Senate vote	George W. Bush	
regulatory czar	Director of the Office of Information and Regulatory Affairs Office of Management and Budget	Cass Sunstein	2009–2012	President nominated, Senate confirmed	Barack Obama	✓
rubber czar	Rubber Director	Bill Jeffers	1942–1943	(New position), Exec order, appointed by Chairman of War Production Board	Franklin Roosevelt	
savings & loan czar	Director, Office of Thrift Supervision	Timothy Ryan	1990–1997	President nominated, Senate confirmed	George H. W. Bush	✓
science czar	Science Advisor to the President, Director, White House Office of Science and Technology Policy	John Marburger	2001 Oct – 2009 Jan	President nominated, Senate confirmed	George W. Bush	✓
science czar	Director of the Office of Science and Technology Policy	John Holdren	2009–2017	President nominated, Senate confirmed	Barack Obama	✓
shipping czar	Administrator, War Shipping Administration	Emory S. Land	1942–1946	Exec order	Franklin Roosevelt	
stimulus accountability, stimulus oversight	Chairman, Recovery Accountability and Transparency Board	Earl Devaney	2009	(New position), created by statute, President appointed	Barack Obama	
technology czar, chief technology czar	Associate Director of the White House Office of Science and Technology Policy, Chief Technology Officer (CTO), Assistant to the President	Aneesh Chopra	2009–2012	President nominated, Senate confirmed	Barack Obama	✓
terrorism czar, counter-terrorism czar	National coordinator for security, infrastructure protection and counter-terrorism, member of National Security Council, cabinet-level position	Richard A. Clarke	1998–2001	President appointed	Bill Clinton	
terrorism czar	National coordinator for security, infrastructure protection and counter-terrorism, cabinet level rank removed	Richard A. Clarke	2001 Jan–Oct	(Held over from prior administration) President Clinton appointed	George W. Bush	
terrorism czar, counterterrorism czar	National Director for Combating Terrorism, Deputy National Security Advisor	Wayne Downing	2001 Nov – 2002 Jun	(New position), President appointed	George W. Bush	
terrorism czar	Assistant to the President for Homeland Security and Counterterrorism	John O. Brennan	2009	President appointed	Barack Obama	
trade czar	Senior Policy Advisor in the White House on behalf of the United States Trade Representative.	Mary Ryckman	2012	Appointed by USTR Michael Froman in 2012 She also represents the USTR on the President's Council on Women and Girls.	Barack Obama	
transportation czar	Director, Office of Defense Transportation	Joseph Bartlett Eastman	1941–1944	(New position), Exec order, President appointed	Franklin Roosevelt	
transportation czar	Director, Office of Defense Transportation	J. Monroe Johnson	1944–1949	President appointed	Franklin Roosevelt	
urban affairs czar	Director of the White House Office of Urban Affairs Policy	Adolfo Carrion	2009–2010	Exec Order, President appointed	Barack Obama	
war czar	Assistant to the President and Deputy National Security Advisor for Iraq and Afghanistan	Douglas Lute	2007–2009	(New position), President nominated, Senate confirmed	George W. Bush	✓
war czar	Assistant to the President and Deputy National Security Advisor for Iraq and Afghanistan	Douglas Lute	2009–2010?	(Held over from prior administration) President Bush nominated, Senate confirmed	Barack Obama	✓
weapons czar	Under Secretary of Defense for Acquisition, Technology, and Logistics (AT&L)	Ashton Carter	2009	President nominated, Senate confirmed	Barack Obama	✓
weapons of mass destruction czar, nonproliferation czar	Special Assistant to the President and White House Coordinator for Arms Control and Weapons of Mass Destruction, Proliferation, and Terrorism	Gary Samore	2009–2013	President appointed	Barack Obama	
weatherization czar	Program Manager, Office of Weatherization and Intergovernmental Program, U.S. Department of Energy's Office of Energy Efficiency and Renewable Energy (EERE)	Gil Sperling	2008–Unknown	Career incumbent, retained from George W. Bush administration	Barack Obama	
weatherization czar	Program Manager, Office of Weatherization and Intergovernmental Program, U.S. Department of Energy's Office of Energy Efficiency and Renewable Energy (EERE)	Gil Sperling	2008–Unknown	Career incumbent, retained from George W. Bush administration	George W. Bush	

== See also ==
- Advice and consent
- Politics of the United States during World War II
- War as metaphor
