= Francisco Ruiz =

Francisco Ruiz may refer to:

- Francisco María Ruiz (1754–1839), early settler of San Diego, California
- Francisco Antonio Ruiz (c. 1804–1876), responsible for identifying the bodies of those killed at the Battle of the Alamo
- José Francisco Ruiz (1783–1840), Texas revolutionary and politician
- Francisco Ruiz-Tagle (c. 1790–1860), Chilean president
- Francisco Ruiz Lozano (1607–1677), Peruvian soldier, astronomer, mathematician and educator
- José Francisco Ruiz Massieu (1946–1994), Mexican politician
- Francisco Ruiz (volleyball) (born 1991), Spanish volleyball player
- Francisco Ruiz (bishop) (1476–1528), Spanish Roman Catholic bishop
- Francisco Olvera Ruiz (born 1956), Mexican IRP politician
- Francisco Ruiz (public health official), American public health official
