= Linda Norman =

Linda Norman may refer to:

- Linda Norman (nurse), American nurse and academic administrator
- Linda Norman (politician), member of the Maryland Senate
