= Grant Colfax =

American doctor

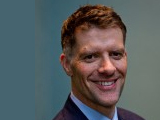

White House AIDS Policy Coordinator
- In office March 14, 2012 – January 13, 2014
- President: Barack Obama
- Preceded by: Jeffrey Crowley
- Succeeded by: Douglas M. Brooks

Personal details
- Born: Boonville, California, U.S.
- Education: Harvard College (BA); Harvard Medical School (MD)

Grant Colfax is an American academic and public health official who served as the seventh AIDS Policy Coordinator (or "AIDS Czar") from 2012 to 2014. A doctor, he had previously been director of the San Francisco Department of Public Health.
