= Kristine Gebbie =

American academic (1943–2022)

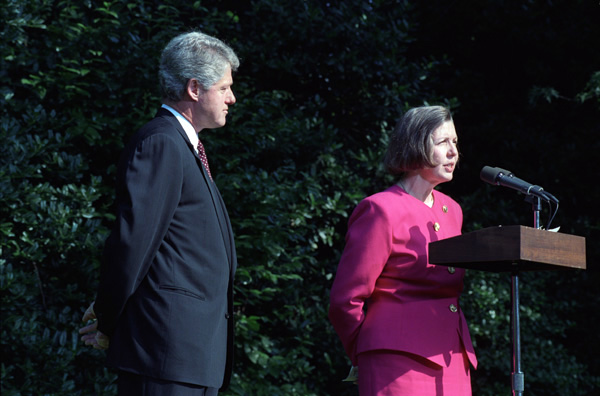
- Gebbie with President Bill Clinton in 1993

White House AIDS Policy Coordinator
- In office June 25, 1993 – August 2, 1994
- President: Bill Clinton
- Preceded by: Position established
- Succeeded by: Patricia Fleming

Secretary of the Washington State Department of Health
- In office 1989 – June 25, 1993
- Governor: Booth Gardner

Personal details
- Born: Kristine Elizabeth Moore; June 26, 1943 Sioux City, Iowa, U.S.
- Died: May 17, 2022 (aged 78) Adelaide, Australia
- Spouses: Neil Gebbie (divorced) Lester Nils Wright (died 2022)
- Children: 3, 2 stepchildren
- Education: St. Olaf College (BSN); University of California, Los Angeles (MSN); University of Michigan (DPH)

Kristine Elizabeth Moore Gebbie (June 26, 1943 – May 17, 2022) was an American academic and public health official who served as the first AIDS Policy Coordinator (or "AIDS Czar") from 1993 to 1994. A nurse and epidemiologist, she had previously been director of the Oregon Department of Health and Secretary of the Washington State Department of Health, and was later a professor of nursing and Dean of the Hunter-Bellevue School of Nursing at Hunter College.

== Early life and education ==
Gebbie was born in Sioux City, Iowa, the daughter of Irene (Stewart), who worked for the U.S. Fish and Wildlife Service, and Thomas Moore, a career officer in the Army. Her father's career took the family to Panama, the Philippines, and Albuquerque, New Mexico, and she spent part of her childhood in Miles City, Montana, with her grandparents.

Inspired by an aunt to become a nurse, Gebbie worked as a nurse's aide in high school. She earned a Bachelor of Science in Nursing from St. Olaf College in 1965, a Master of Science in Nursing in community mental health from the University of California, Los Angeles in 1968, and a Doctor of Public Health in health policy from the University of Michigan School of Public Health in 1995; she was working on her doctoral dissertation, on the evolution of Washington State statutes, when appointed AIDS Policy Coordinator.

== Career ==
Gebbie was the director of the Oregon Department of Health from 1978 to 1989 and the Secretary of the Washington State Department of Health from 1989 to 1993.

As the HIV/AIDS epidemic unfolded in the United States in the 1980s, Gebbie became a member of the AIDS task force of the American Association of State and Territorial Health Officials. Despite being an outspoken opponent of the Reagan administration's policies on AIDS testing, she was appointed as a member of the President's Commission on the HIV Epidemic and subsequently served on the National Commission on AIDS and as chairman of the advisory panel on H.I.V. prevention at the U.S. Centers for Disease Control and Prevention. In June 1993 she was appointed by President Bill Clinton as the first U.S. AIDS Czar (AIDS Policy Coordinator). After criticism from AIDS organizations that she was not achieving enough, she resigned the position in July 1994.

Gebbie then became the Elizabeth Standish Gill Professor at the Columbia University School of Nursing and Director of the university's Center for Health Policy. In 2008 she left Columbia for Hunter College, where she was the acting Joan Hansen Grabe Dean of the Hunter-Bellevue School of Nursing until 2010.

She and her husband retired in Adelaide, Australia, where she was a faculty member at the Torrens Resilience Initiative of the Flinders University School of Nursing & Midwifery and at the University of Adelaide Nursing School.

Gebbie was a consultant to the International Council of Nurses on disaster nursing, leading the development of its Core Competencies in Disaster Nursing, and a consultant to the World Health Organization in developing its Global Competency Framework for Universal Health Coverage.

== Honors and memberships ==
Gebbie was a fellow of the New York Academy of Medicine and an elected member of the National Academy of Medicine and the American Academy of Nursing.

She received the Ruth B. Freeman Award of the Public Health Nursing Section of the American Public Health Association in 2003, the GE Healthcare Pioneering Spirit Award of the American Association of Critical Care Nurses in 2010, and a Nurse 21 Award from the University of California, Los Angeles in 2012.

== Personal life and death ==
Gebbie had three children with her first husband, Neil Gebbie. Her second marriage was to Lester Nils Wright, a physician, with whom she had two stepsons. He died in April 2022. Gebbie died in Adelaide on May 17, 2022, from cancer.
