= President's Commission on the HIV Epidemic =

The President's Commission on the HIV Epidemic was a commission formed by President Ronald Reagan in 1987 to investigate the AIDS pandemic. It is also known as the Watkins Commission for James D. Watkins, its chairman when the commission issued its final report in 1988.

== Organization ==
President Reagan issued Executive Order 12601 creating the President's Commission on the HIV Epidemic on June 24, 1987. On June 26, he appointed W. Eugene Mayberry, CEO of the Mayo Clinic, to chair the commission. Jeff Levi, executive director of the National Gay and Lesbian Task Force objected to the appointment of someone with no experience with the disease, but others praised Mayberry's experience in both medical research and clinical services. Administration officials said it would resist pressure from gay rights activists to include a representative of the gay community on the commission. Gary Bauer, the assistant to the President for policy development who would soon become head of the Family Research Council, said: "I would be very surprised if an administration opposed to making appointments on the basis of race or sex would agree to make an appointment based on bedroom habits". The commission was charged with producing a preliminary report in 3 months and a final report within a year.

The president named the other commission members on July 23. Saying AIDS needed to go "the way of smallpox and polio", President Reagan announced the appointments at the commission's first meeting. They included:

- Colleen Conway-Welch, dean of nursing at Vanderbilt University
- John J. Creedon, CEO of Metropolitan Life Insurance Company
- Theresa L. Crenshaw, a sex educator and opponent of condoms as a means of preventing the spread of HIV
- Richard M. DeVos, president of Amway
- Burton J. Lee III, a physician at the Memorial Sloan-Kettering Cancer Center
- Frank Lilly, a geneticist at the Albert Einstein College of Medicine. Lilly had served on the board of the Gay Men's Health Crisis (GMHC) from 1984 to 1986. He was "one of the first openly gay Presidential appointees".
- Woodrow A. Myers Jr., an African American and the health commissioner of Indiana and president of the Association of State and Territorial Health Officers; named vice-chairman by Mayberry.
- Cardinal John O'Connor
- Penny Pullen, an Illinois legislator and advocate of mandatory premarital HIV testing and later founder of the Illinois Family Institute
- Corinna "Cory" SerVaas, editor of the Saturday Evening Post
- William B. Walsh, president of Project HOPE, a medical relief organization
- James D. Watkins, a retired admiral

At the commission's first meeting, Lilly and O'Connor, seated side by side, "chatted cordially", the New York Times reported. When the meeting ended, reporters and television cameras surrounded Lilly leaving him, he said, "shell-shocked" and "scared to death". Senator Gordon Humphrey, a New Hampshire Republican, attacked Lilly's appointment, said the president "should strive at all costs to avoid sending the message to society—especially to impressionable youth—that homosexuality is simply an alternative lifestyle" and said the President should have named heterosexual experts to the commission.

The commission planned visits to review activities in several localities, beginning with a two-day visit to New York City by 5 commissioners in August/September. They visited hospitals and met with volunteers, health-care providers, and representatives of gay organizations.

The commission's executive director was forced to resign in September "after a power struggle and allegations of inadequate performance," wrote the New York Times, in which Mayberry yielded to the demands of some members of the commission for better staff support than they felt they were receiving. Lee said: "For whatever reason, lack of staff or whatever, things just weren't happening. With Gene Mayberry out in Rochester, Minnesota, most of the time, the commission felt we had to get a really good, high-powered, full-time person" to manage the commission staff. On October 7, Mayberry and Myers quit, as did the commission's senior staff adviser for medical and research affairs, Franklin Cockerill 3d, a Mayo Clinic physician specializing in AIDS. Lilly said he was considering resigning but would wait to see who replaced the chairman and vice-chairman. The administration immediately announced the appointment of James D. Watkins, a retired admiral who had been Chief of Naval Operations. The New York Times said Mayberry had been "viewed as a moderating influence on the views of other members who are considered more ideological in their approach" and that "[b]y virtually all accounts, the commission has got off to a slow start in recruiting staff and organizing for its task." Myers said that "The personalities are intense" and that "I don't feel the commission as currently constituted would be effective." Comments from those familiar with the commission and its responsibilities expressed dismay at the resignations. Richard Dunne, executive secretary of GMHC, said: "The AIDS epidemic is out of control, and it seems, so is the Presidential Commission on AIDS." On October 9, DeVos said that the president needed to avoid naming commissioners who were "emotionally" involved in the commission's work and that, in one newspaper's account of his statement, "some homosexuals want to 'capture the agenda'".

Years later, Watkins' wife reported that Watkins told Reagan "I'm a sailor and a submariner, and I know nothing about medicine", and that Reagan replied: "You're exactly who we're looking for." On October 11, Watkins announced plans to move quickly with reorganizing the commission staff. Noting that he was speaking to reporters on the day of a political march and rally in Washington, he said, "We have in Washington today one of the largest gay rights activist demonstrations that we have had—we are sensitive to them as human beings and to their issues". He continued: "We haven't done the job to date, I am sorry to say, but I feel comfortable and the other members of the commission feel comfortable that I can take it and mold them together and bring all of our prima donnas, including me, into a nice, neat, unified package." He named a new executive director on October 13.

Without Bauer's approval, Watkins later added two commission members who had track records as critics of the Reagan administration: Kristine Gebbie, Oregon public health commissioner and president of the AIDS Task Force of the American Society of State and Territorial Health Officers, and Benny J. Primm, director of a New York City treatment program for addicts. Primm was the only African American on the commission and the only one with expertise on the intravenous drug use. Of the challenge of heading the commission, Watkins later said: "I really wasn't sure I could pull it out of the swamp."

== Reports ==
In February 1988, the commission released an interim report focused on IV drugs that called for a $20-billion, 10-year effort to fight AIDS. Watkins described it as "only seven-tenths of a percent of the defense budget." William B. Rubenstein, an attorney with the American Civil Liberties Union (ACLU) who earlier sued the commission anticipating that its membership would bias its findings, found Watkins' work "a pleasant surprise".

On June 2, 1988, Watkins described the commission's draft report and called for state and federal laws to provide anti-discrimination protection for AIDS patients. He called that discrimination "the rule, not the exception." He explained that testing and the identification of sexual partners could not be successful without such protections against discrimination: "So, once those with HIV are treated like anyone else with a disability, then we will find that what is best for the individual is also best for the public health." He said "Semen, blood, and ignorance surround this epidemic, and we were in that last category" when starting work.

In an initial review, Dr. Mathilde Krim, founder of the American Foundation for AIDS Research thought the commission's work both more expert than she expected and free of ideology. Tim Sweeney, executive director of GMHC call the draft report "courageous, aggressive and compassionate" and added: "We challenge the President, Congress and presidential candidates to respond to this report by implementing its recommendations". The American Public Health Association called it "an aggressive first step towards developing an integrated national strategy to deal with the AIDS epidemic."

The commission produced its final report on June 24, 1988. The commissioners approved it by a vote of 7 to 6. Its recommendations surprised observers by arguing against every measure advocated by conservative observers, such as mandatory testing, and characterizing partner notification as an inappropriate activity for medical professionals. Its principal findings and recommendations were designed to provide a national strategy for managing the epidemic. It made more than 500 recommendations, which it summarized under these headings:

1. replacement of the obsolete term "AIDS" (Acquired Immunodeficiency Syndrome) with the term "HIV infection";
2. early diagnosis of HIV infection;
3. increased testing to facilitate understanding of the incidence and prevalence of HIV infection;
4. treatment of HIV infection as a disability under federal and state law;
5. stronger legal protection of the privacy of HIV-infected persons;
6. immediate implementation of preventive measures such as confidential partner notification;
7. prevention and treatment of intravenous drug abuse;
8. implementation of drug and alcohol abuse education programs;
9. establishment of federal and state scholarship and loan programs to encourage nurses to serve in areas of high HIV impact;
10. extension and expansion of the National Health Service Corps;
11. aggressive biomedical research;
12. more equitable and cost-effective financing of care for HIV-infected persons;
13. addressing the concerns of health care workers;
14. federal assurance of the safety of the blood supply;
15. undertaking all reasonable efforts to avoid transfusion of another person's blood;
16. development and implementation of education programs;
17. addressing the problem of HIV-infected "border babies";
18. addressing the problem of high-risk adolescents;
19. addressing ethical issues raised by the HIV epidemic; and
20. support and encouragement of international efforts to combat the spread of HIV infection.

Vice President George Bush, who was running for president at the time, immediately endorsed both an executive order and legislation to meet the commission's call for the extension of Federal anti-discrimination protection to those with AIDS and those who test positive for HIV. He emphasized children in his discussions with reporters: "My conscience has been advising me on AIDS.... I'd hate it if a kid of mine got a blood transfusion and my grandson had AIDS and the community discriminated against that child, that innocent child". Reagan said his drug policy advisor would review the report and make recommendations to him in 30 days. President Reagan later said he opposed such discrimination in principle but took no action before his term as president ended in January 1989. The administration took small steps. It acted to inform recipients of blood transfusions that they were at risk, made plans to speed FDA drug approvals, and developed proposals to add facilities for the Centers for Disease Control and the National Institutes of Health.

Anthony Fauci later described the significance of Watkins' military background to the debate over the nation's response to AIDS: "To have a presidential commission chairman with his background to come out so strongly against stigma and discrimination was a very, very important step". Randy Shilts called the report "a sweeping battle plan.... AIDS was war, Watkins reasoned, and in a war somebody must be in charge; that's how you get things done."

Congress passed legislation sponsored by Representative Roy Rowland, a Georgia Democrat and the only physician in Congress, that created the National Commission on AIDS. The legislation specified that commission's members must be "individuals with experience and/or expertise pertinent to the AIDS epidemic". It produced several reports over the next 4 years.

== See also ==
- Ronald Reagan and AIDS
- Office of National AIDS Policy
- National Commission on AIDS
- Presidential Advisory Council on HIV/AIDS
- President's Emergency Plan for AIDS Relief
