= Fort Tenoxtitlán =

Former Mexican fort in Burleson County, Texas, USA

Coordinates: 30.5810°N 96.6354°W

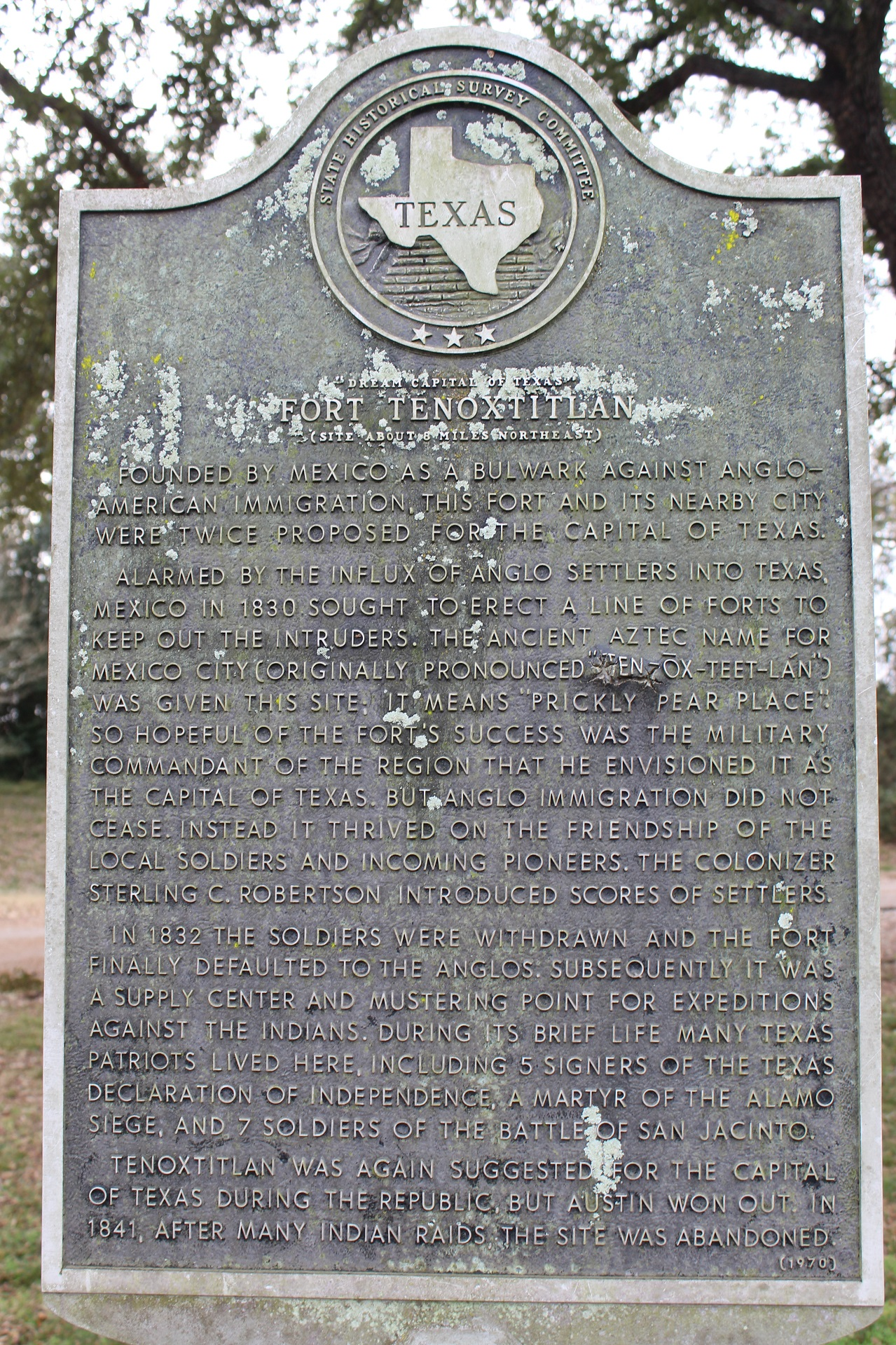
Fort Tenoxtitlán Texas State Historical Society plaque

Fort Tenoxtitlán was established by Mexico in 1830 in what later became Burleson County, Texas. The fortification was in accordance with the Law of April 6, 1830 to deter colonization from the United States. The name literally means "prickly pear place" and was derived from the Aztec city of Tenochtitlan, which later became Mexico City.

Under the command of Mexican General Manuel de Mier y Terán, José Francisco Ruiz arrived with the Second Flying Company of San Carlos de Parras and established the fort on the west bank of the Brazos River on October 17, 1830. It proved to be a failed attempt at stopping Anglo immigration after Stephen F. Austin successfully appealed directly to Mexican President Anastasio Bustamante, receiving exemptions for his colony and that of Green DeWitt.

Having failed to stop Anglo immigration and suffering from poor health, Mier y Terán committed suicide on July 3, 1832, in Padilla, Tamaulipas.

Ruiz evacuated the fort on July 13. The site was once in competition with Austin to become the capital of the Republic of Texas. It was abandoned in 1841.
