= David Brailer =

American government official

- David Brailer in 2026
- Born: July 16, 1959 (age 67); Kingwood, West Virginia, U.S.
- Education: West Virginia University (BS, MD, BA); University of Pennsylvania (PhD)
- Spouse: Matthew Rhoa
- Children: 2

David J. Brailer (born July 16, 1959) is an American health care executive and government official.

On May 6, 2004, Brailer was appointed by the administration of President George W. Bush as the nation's first 'Health Information Technology Czar'. Brailer's official title was National Health Information Technology Coordinator. In this role, he developed the nation's strategy for electronic records and transformation of research and public health with the goal of widespread deployment of health information technology within 10 years.

Brailer remained in his government post for two years. During his service, he was named the Most Powerful Person in Healthcare in 2003 by the magazine Modern Healthcare. Following his public service, he co—chaired a Federal Advisory Committee called the American Health Information Community and transitioned to the private sector where he has held several executive and advisory positions.

== Education ==
Brailer holds doctoral degrees in both medicine and economics. He earned his Ph.D. in managerial economics from the Wharton School of the University of Pennsylvania in 1992 and his M.D. from West Virginia University School of Medicine in 1986.

While in medical school, he was a Charles A. Dana Scholar at the University of Pennsylvania, School of Medicine. Brailer served on the board of trustees of the American Medical Association. He completed his medical residency at the Hospital of the University of Pennsylvania and became board certified in internal medicine. Brailer was a Robert Wood Johnson Clinical Scholar at the University of Pennsylvania.

He earned another bachelor's in political science from West Virginia University in 1991.

== Career ==
=== University of Pennsylvania ===
After completing a general medicine residency at the Hospital of the University of Pennsylvania in 1991, Brailer worked at the University of Pennsylvania as a physician in general medicine and immune deficiency.

Brailer holds an adjunct professorship at the Wharton School, is an associate professor in internal medicine for the University of Pennsylvania Health System, and is a senior fellow for the Leonard Davis Institute of Health Economics.

Previously at the Wharton School, he founded the health management program's health information technology program, taught in the MBA program, and lectured in the executive education program.

=== CareScience ===
In 1992, Brailer left academia and founded a company spun out of his Ph.D. thesis. This became CareScience Inc., a Philadelphia software firm that helped hospitals improve efficiency and prevent errors. Under Brailer, CareScience established the nation's first health care Application Service Provider (ASP). Brailer led the company through several financings, strategic partnerships, an initial public offering in 2000, and sales to global software firm Quovadx in 2003.

=== Health Technology Center ===
After CareScience, Brailer took an advisory role at Health Technology Center, a non-profit research and education organization that provides strategic information and resources to health care organizations about the future impact of technology in health care delivery. There, he advised the center on a number of regional and national data sharing projects.

=== Health Evolution Partners ===
In mid-2007, Brailer founded Health Evolution Partners, a private equity fund focused on rapidly growing middle market companies in the health care industry, with a mission to “invest in things that can reduce the crushing costs of health care.” The California Public Employees' Retirement System (CalPERS) invested $700 million in the fund. Health Evolution Partners targeted opportunities across the key sectors of the health care economy – hospitals, physicians, managed care, pharmaceutical developers, device makers and consumer products and services. Notable Health Evolution Partners investments included Halcyon Home Health, Prolacta Bioscience, Optimal IMX, Mollen Immunization Clinics, Kisimul, Freedom Innovations, CenseoHealth and CambridgeSoft.

Notable exits:

On March 23, 2011, CambridgeSoft was acquired by PerkinElmer, Inc. in a $220 million deal.

On December 7, 2017, CenseoHealth Health were acquired by New Mountain Capital for an undisclosed amount.

On July 23, 2017, Kisimul Group was acquired by Antin Infrastructure Partners in a £200 million+ deal.

On January 10, 2018, Freedom Innovations was acquired by Otto Bock HealthCare for an undisclosed amount.

On December 30, 2024, Prolacta Biosciences was acquired by EW Healthcare Partners for an undisclosed amount.

=== Cigna ===
In September 2022, Dr. Brailer was named the Chief Health Officer of Cigna. Brailer was later named Chief Transformation Officer of The Cigna Group, where he led enterprise-wide efforts to position the company as a leader in consumer value. Brailer left his roles at The Cigna Group in September, 2025 to return to investing and public policy.

== US Department of Health and Human Services ==
On May 6, 2004, Brailer was appointed as the first National Health Information Technology Coordinator, pursuant to Executive Order 13335 by President George W. Bush on April 27, 2004, which called for widespread deployment of health information technology within 10 years.

In this role, Brailer designed and directed a bipartisan effort to encourage the digitalization of health care. His work led to the formation of both the National Health Information Network and the Meaningful Use incentives program for the adoption of electronic health records.

== Awards and achievements ==
Brailer was the first recipient of the National Library of Medicine Martin Epstein Award for Medical Computing Research for a student paper on expert systems.

He was also one of the first medical students to serve on the board of trustees for the American Medical Association.

Most notably, he was the country's first health IT czar, leading the national effort to digitalize healthcare.

== See also ==
- List of U.S. executive branch czars
