= Amy Lansky =

American academic

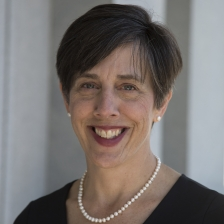

Academic background
- Education: Swarthmore College; University of North Carolina at Chapel Hill

Amy Lansky is an American academic. She was the director of the Office of National AIDS Policy.

== Education ==
Lansky earned a bachelor's degree in political science from Swarthmore College. She holds doctoral and master's degrees in public health from the University of North Carolina at Chapel Hill.

== Career ==
Lansky served as the Deputy Director for Surveillance, Epidemiology, and Laboratory Science in Centers for Disease Control and Prevention’s Division of HIV/AIDS Prevention where she provided scientific direction and oversight for HIV surveillance activities, epidemiologic studies and clinical trials, and laboratory research. Lansky was a Senior Policy Advisor to the Office of National Drug Control Policy and Office of National AIDS Policy where she ensured coordination on issues of substance abuse and HIV infection, and co-authored the National HIV/AIDS Strategy: Updated to 2020. She later became the director of the Office of National AIDS Policy.
