= Second Flying Company of San Carlos de Parras =

Spanish and Mexican mounted lancer company in Texas

Segunda Compañía Volante de San Carlos de Parras
- La Compañía del Álamo
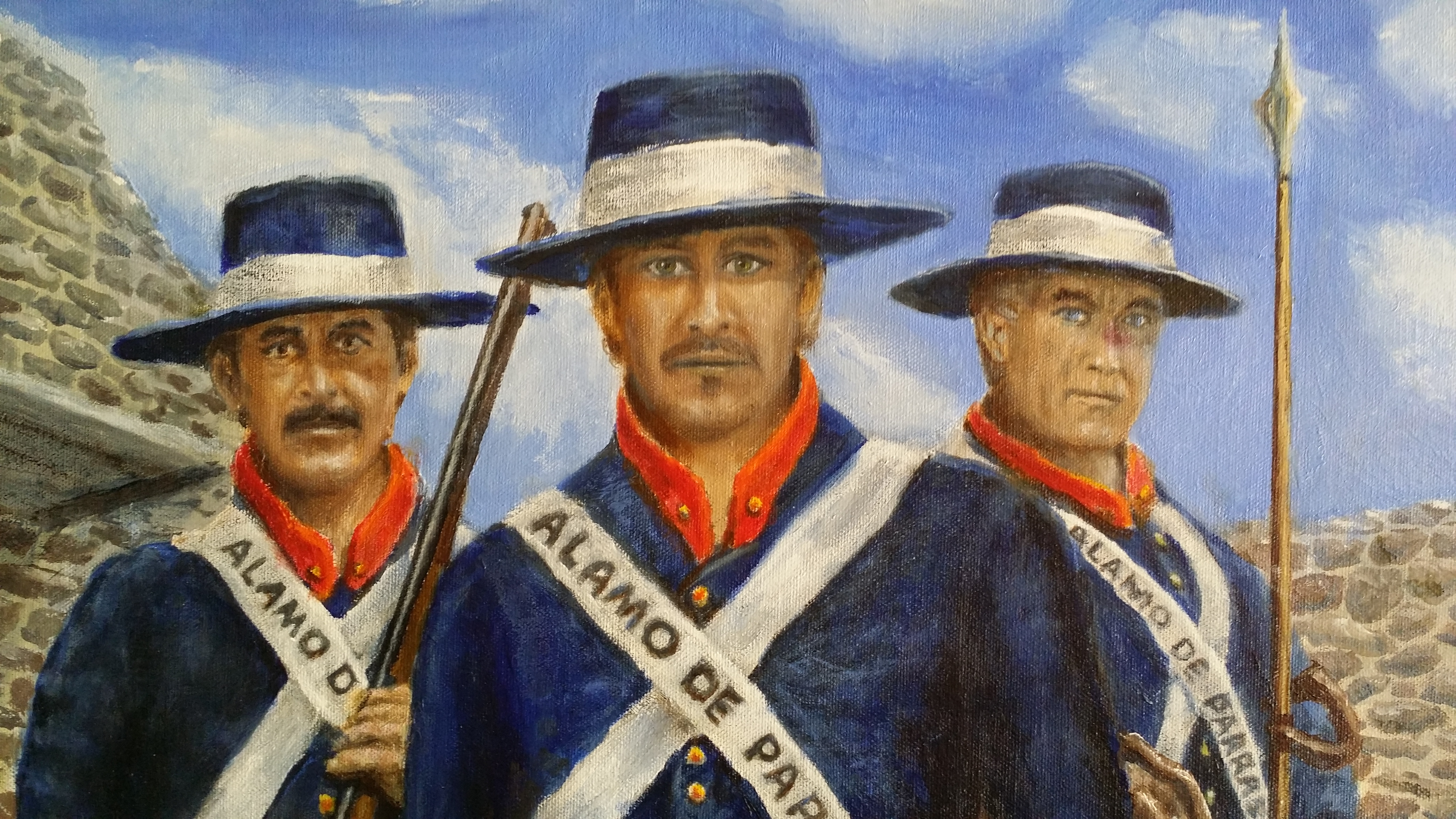
- Modern reconstruction of three lancers in the uniform prescribed by the 1772 presidio regulations
- Active: 1788–1835
- Country: Spain (to 1821); Mexico (1821–1835)
- Branch: Spanish Army; Mexican Army
- Type: Flying company (mounted lancers)
- Size: about 100
- Garrison/HQ: Mission San Antonio de Valero (1803–1830, 1832–1835); Fort Tenoxtitlán (1830–1832)
- Engagements: Battle of Medina; Siege of Béxar

Commanders
- Commandant (to 1813): Vicente Tarín
- Commandant (1830–1832): José Francisco Ruiz

The Segunda Compañía Volante de San Carlos de Parras (Second Flying Company of San Carlos de Parras), also called the Compañía del Álamo de Parras, La Compañía del Álamo, or simply El Álamo, was a company of mounted lancers from southern Coahuila. It garrisoned the secularized Mission San Antonio de Valero from 1803 and gave that mission the name Alamo. In 1830–1832, under Lieutenant Colonel José Francisco Ruiz, the company built and occupied Fort Tenoxtitlán on the Brazos. It left the mission for the last time in December 1835, during the Siege of Béxar.

== Origin and the Alamo name ==
The company was raised among settlers of the pueblo of San José y Santiago del Álamo, near Parras in the Comarca Lagunera of southern Coahuila, and was the most important of the Tlaxcalan compañías volantes of that region. A compañía volante or flying company was a light mounted unit used to patrol the northern frontier of New Spain. This one was a company of about 100 lancers.

It arrived in Texas in January 1803 and occupied the secularized Mission San Antonio de Valero, under the jurisdiction of the curacy of the Villa de San Fernando and the bishop of Nuevo León. In place of the long title, the men and the town used La Compañía del Álamo, or El Álamo, after their pueblo. Through that association the mission came to be called the Alamo. The military community inside the walls, including families, numbered more than 200.

== Mexican War of Independence ==
During the Gutiérrez–Magee Expedition of the Mexican War of Independence, the company's commandant, Vicente Tarín, left his command and with some of his men joined the insurgents fighting for independence from Spain. He fought at the Battle of Medina 18 August 1813. After the royalist victory and pacification of the region, the company remained associated with Valero.

In the fall of 1817 an order came to refill the ranks. Seventy-five men detached from the veteran company of Nuestra Señora del Carmen were sent to the Valero fort and San Antonio de Béxar. Local conscripts filled the remaining places.

== Mexican service and Fort Tenoxtitlán ==
After Mexican independence, General Manuel de Mier y Terán posted garrisons on the frontier to check illegal immigration and smuggling. In 1830 the Álamo de Parras company, commanded by Lieutenant Colonel José Francisco Ruiz, built and occupied Fort Tenoxtitlán in present-day Burleson County. The company was at the fort from 25 June 1830 to 22 August 1832.

The post was isolated, short of supplies, and hard to hold. The company abandoned the fort on 22 August 1832. General Mier y Terán had killed himself after the collapse of his colonization plan. Ruiz, ill and demoralized, evacuated the garrison and the Mexican settlement to San Antonio de Béxar, which they reached on 14 September. Most of the soldiers then joined troops leaving Nacogdoches for Matamoros, recalled to the civil war between Antonio López de Santa Anna and Anastasio Bustamante. Ruiz did not go with them and retired from the army altogether.

What remained of the company returned to Mission Valero and remained there until 11 December 1835. During the Siege of Béxar it served as reinforcements for Martín Perfecto de Cos.

On 11 December 1835, Cos surrendered San Antonio and the Alamo. Under the capitulation his force, including the remnant of the company, retired into Mexico's interior toward Monclova within six days. That ended the company's association with Mission Valero.

== See also ==
- Alamo Mission
- Fort Tenoxtitlán
- Military history of Mexico
