= Sandra Thurman =

Former White House AIDS Czar

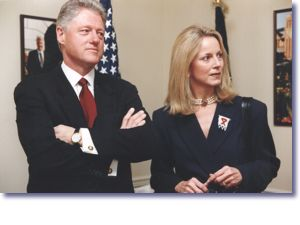
- Bill Clinton and Sandra Thurman at the 1998 World AIDS Day Commemoration at the White House

Sandra Thurman is known for her work on AIDS. She was appointed in 1997 as the third director of the Office of National AIDS Policy serving in Bill Clinton's administration. As of 2023 she is the senior advisor to the Division of Global HIV and Tuberculosis at the Centers for Disease Control and Prevention and Chief Strategy Officer at the Office of the Global AIDS Coordinator, which leads the implementation of PEPFAR, and Global Health Diplomacy at the U.S. Department of State. She is also a Professor of Practice at the Rollins School of Public Health at Emory University.

== Early life and education ==
Thurman is an only child. Her father worked in clothing manufacturing and her mother, Marge Thurman, was the chair of the Georgia Democratic Party. Thurman earned her undergraduate degree from Mercer University in Atlanta, Georgia. She earned her Master of Arts degree in Community Pastoral Care and HIV/AIDS from St. Paul's University in Limuru, Kenya.

== Career ==
Thurman began her association with AID Atlanta by fundraising, and by 1989 was the organization's executive director. She worked at AID Atlanta for ten years before taking the position as the director of the Office of National AIDS Policy in the Clinton administration. While in this position Thurman indicated her priority was to make AIDS a priority in the Clinton administration.

Thurman also worked on Bill Clinton's presidential campaigns in 1992 and 1996.

In March and April 1999 Thurman and David Dinkins traveled with a Presidential Mission to Africa which highlighted the tragedy of children orphaned by AIDS.

Thurman was a founding member of Cities Advocating Emergency AIDS Relief and has served on the board of directors of numerous AIDS organizations. She also served as Director of Advocacy Programs for the Task Force for Child Survival and Development at the Carter Center.

In 2008 Thurman accepted a position at Rollins School of Public Health at Emory University.

In 2021 she was honored with an Elizabeth Taylor Commitment to End AIDS award.

== Selected publications ==
- Blevins, John; Benn, Christoph; Thurman, Sandra (2016-07-02). "Reflections on HIV-Related Experiences of Two Global Funding Mechanisms Supporting Religious Health Providers". The Review of Faith & International Affairs. 14 (3): 110–117. doi:10.1080/15570274.2016.1215815. ISSN 1557-0274.
- Thurman, Sandra L. (1999). "Lessons from Africa". Forum for Applied Research and Public Policy. 14 (4): 88–91.
- Thurman, Sandra L. (2001). "Joining forces to fight HIV and AIDS". The Washington Quarterly. 24 (1): 189–196. doi:10.1162/016366001561465. ISSN 0163-660X.
