= Colleen Conway-Welch =

American nurse and academic administrator

Colleen Conway-Welch (April 26, 1944 – October 12, 2018) was an American nursing and public health advocate. She served as Dean of the Vanderbilt University School of Nursing (VUSN) from 1984 to 2013 and on President Ronald Reagan's Commission on the HIV Epidemic.

== Biography ==
Conway-Welch was born in Monticello, Iowa, and was the oldest of three sisters. Her mother was a teacher and her father was a farmer who went on to work in construction. His career required the family to constantly move to his latest project.

Conway-Welch entered Georgetown University School of Nursing at age 16 on a full scholarship. She earned degrees from Georgetown, Catholic University School of Nursing, and New York University, where she received her doctorate.

Conway-Welch began her career as a labor and delivery staff nurse at Georgetown University in the 1960s. She also worked in Honolulu, in emergency rooms in San Francisco, and as a midwife. In the early 1980s, she was asked to run the midwifery program at the University of Colorado Health Sciences Center in Denver.

=== VUSN ===
In 1984, Conway-Welch was asked to be VUSN's dean. At the time, the school had only around 100 baccalaureates, a small number of master's graduates, and no doctoral program. She overhauled the curriculum, introducing an accelerated master's program. Under her leadership, VUSN started its Doctor of Philosophy program in 1993 and its Doctor of Nursing Practice program in 2008. One of the largest nursing schools in the country, VUSN also earned a top national ranking. Conway-Welch retired in 2013 and was named Dean Emerita by VUSN. She was succeeded as dean by Linda Norman.

== Personal life ==
Shortly after becoming VUSN's dean, Conway-Welch made a fundraising call to prominent Nashville businessman Ted Welch. They later married and went on to be fixtures in political, charity, and civic events. He died in 2014; she died of pancreatic cancer in 2018.

== Honors ==
Conway-Welch was active nationally in health policy and education. She was named by President Reagan to serve on his Commission on the HIV Epidemic in 1987 and, in 2006, was nominated by President George W. Bush to serve as a member of the Board of Regents of the Uniformed Services University of the Health Sciences in Bethesda, Maryland.

In 2016, she was inducted into the Tennessee Health Care Hall of Fame and was named a Living Legend by the American Academy of Nursing for her contributions to the nursing profession. In 2017, she was elected to the Modern Healthcare Hall of Fame.
