= Carol Thompson =

Director of the Office of National AIDS Policy 2003-2006

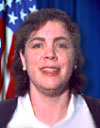
- Education: University of California, B.A.
- Occupation: Former Deputy Assistant Secretary for African Affairs with the U.S. State Department

Carol J. Thompson was a Director of the Office of National AIDS Policy (ONAP) for nearly two years during the administration of George W. Bush. She served as the Acting Director from August 2003 until President George W. Bush appointed her as Director in April 2004. She resigned in early 2006 to take a job as Deputy Assistant Secretary for African Affairs with the U.S. State Department.

Previously, Thompson had worked in the government sector at the U.S. Department of Health and Human Services and in the Office of the U.S. Trade Representative. She was employed in the private sector at a pharmaceutical trade lobby group, the Pharmaceutical Research & Manufacturers Association of America.

Thompson has a B.A. degree from the University of California at Los Angeles.

Thompson's appointment as director of the ONAP was criticized because, unlike the two previous Bush-appointed directors of the office, she was neither a medical professional nor gay. However, one gay rights group stated that Thompson's qualifications were irrelevant because the Bush administration had not committed adequate funds to fighting AIDS.
