= Francisco Ruiz (public health official) =

American public health official

White House AIDS Policy Coordinator
- In office April 8, 2024 – January 25, 2025
- President: Joe Biden
- Preceded by: Harold J. Phillips
- Succeeded by: none

Personal details
- Born: Chicago, Illinois, U.S.
- Education: Loyola University Chicago (BA); The New School (MS); Harvard T.H. Chan School of Public Health (DrPH)

Francisco Ruiz is an American academic and public health official who served as the eleventh AIDS Policy Coordinator (or "AIDS Czar") from 2024 to 2025. He had previously been a senior advisor with the Centers for Disease Control and Prevention.
