= National Commission on AIDS =

The U.S. National Commission on AIDS was established by a statute enacted November 4, 1988, with the aim of "promoting the development of a national consensus on policy concerning acquired immune deficiency syndrome [AIDS]". It produced several reports over the next 4 years.

== Creation ==
In response to the Reagan administration's failure to respond to the recommendations of the President's Commission on the HIV Epidemic (1987–88), Congress passed legislation sponsored by Representative Roy Rowland, a Georgia Democrat and the only physician in Congress, that created the National Commission on AIDS. The legislation specified that its members be people "especially qualified ... by reason of their education, training, or experience" and the commission's membership balanced to cover "the fields of medicine, science, law, ethics, health-care economics, and health-care and social services". Five members were appointed by the majority and minority leaders of the House, 5 by the majority and minority leaders of the Senate, and 2 by the President. The Secretaries of Defense, Health and Human Services, and Veterans Affairs served as non-voting members ex officio. The members were given authority to elect their own chairperson. The commission was charged with producing a report after two years and the President was authorized to extend the commission's life for an additional two years.

The commission began work in August 1989 after several months of delay while members were appointed.

== Members ==
Most members of the commission served for the entire period from August 1989 to September 1993, except as indicated:

Co-chairs

- June E. Osborn, dean of public health at the University of Michigan
- David E. Rogers, head of the New York City Mayor's Task Force on AIDS and New York State's AIDS Advisory Council

Other Members

- Diane Ahrens, Minnesota local government official
- Rev. K. Scott Allen, a Baptist minister, coordinator of the AIDS Interfaith Network in Dallas, Texas
- Don C. Des Jarlais, a proponent of needle-exchange programs and a physician with the New York State Division of Substance Abuse Services
- Harlon D. Dalton (August 1989 to January 1993), Yale Law School professor, African American. In March 1992, he described the lack of response on the part of Black politicians: "Any high-visibility politician can point to the one time a year where [AIDS] is mentioned. But there haven't been any votes there. Gay black men don't exist, black men don't vote and babies don't vote."
- Eunice Diaz, community affairs director of White Memorial Medical Center in Los Angeles, California
- Mary D. Fisher, appointed to the commission by Bush to replace Magic Johnson in October 1992 after having both praised and criticized his response to the AIDS crisis. She said: "A lot of people would have me not support the Administration. What good would that do? We need to have people working within the system to make change."
- Donald S. Goldman, New Jersey attorney, author on ethical issues involved in AIDS treatment
- Earvin "Magic" Johnson, Jr. (November 1991 to September 1992), HIV-positive basketball star
- Larry Kessler, executive director of AIDS Action Committee of Massachusetts
- Charles Konigsberg, Jr., director of the health division of the Kansas Department of Health and Environment
- Belinda Mason (August 1989 to September 1991), journalist who died of AIDS-related illnesses in September 1991
- J. Roy Rowland, a physician and congressman, principal sponsor the legislation that created the commission

In July 1992, Johnson told an interviewer that was considering resigning because of the Bush administration's failure to respond to the commission's funding requests. He resigned on September 25, writing in a letter to Bush:

As I think you know, along with my fellow commission members I have been increasingly frustrated by the lack of support, and even opposition, of your Administration to our recommendations—recommendations which have an urgent priority and for which there is a broad consensus in the medical and AIDS communities. I cannot in good conscience continue to serve on a commission whose important work is so utterly ignored by your Administration. ...

Johnson recalled speaking with the president in January:

No matter how good the team may be, I said it won't win the championship without the owner fully in the game. I am disappointed that you dropped the ball, and your Administration is not doing everything that it must to fight this disease.

Secretary of Health and Human Services, Dr. Louis W. Sullivan, defended the administration's record, citing "increased efforts in research, new therapies for those with H.I.V., and extensive health-care services". Arkansas Governor Bill Clinton, then a candidate for the presidency, said: "Mr. Johnson knows that this Administration has not done anything on AIDS. We've got a good AIDS Commission, good AIDS reports, and no action."

In February 1993, Johnson indicated a willingness to rejoin the commission after President Bill Clinton took office.

== Reports ==
The commission published thirteen interim and three annual reports with detailed recommendations.

=== First Annual Report to the President and Congress ===
The First Annual Report to the President and Congress was released in August 1990, one year after the commission work began.

=== America Living With AIDS: Transforming Anger, Fear, and Indifference into Action (Second Annual Report to the President and Congress) ===
As required by statute, the commission its second annual report called America Living with AIDS on September 26, 1991. Its overall assessment said:

Our nation's leaders have not done well. In the past decade, the White House has rarely broken its silence on the topic of AIDS. Congress has shown leadership in developing critical legislation, but has often failed to provide adequate funding for AIDS programs. Articulate leadership guiding Americans toward a proper response to AIDS has been notably absent.

Its principal recommendations included:

- A unified national plan for combating AIDS.
- Universally available treatment for drug abuse and addiction.
- Eliminating laws and regulations that prevent drug users from acquiring clean needles.
- Medical coverage that includes the cost of prescription drugs for all citizens.

Dr. James O. Mason, Assistant Secretary for Health of the Department of Health and Human Services, cited annual budget increases and said in reply:

Lack of leadership? Compared to what? There has been a great deal of leadership and a growing budget. There has been more leadership on this issue than just about any other, such as cancer or heart disease. The amount of time the Secretary and I put in on this issue is inordinate compared to other very serious problems.

=== AIDS: An Expanding Tragedy (Final Report to the President and Congress) ===
The commission's final report, AIDS: An Expanding Tragedy, was released in June 1993 and consisted of just 15 pages plus appendices. Its preface said composing a final report was like "trying to take a snapshot of a tidal way" and continued:

This is a short, sometimes angry report tinged with sadness and foreboding. It is short, because all of what we say here has been said many times before. It is sometimes angry because the carefully considered, widely heralded recommendations contained in our previous reports have been so consistently underfunded or ignored. It is sad because a potentially preventable disease continues to expand relentlessly and cause loss of life in young Americans on an unprecedented and unacceptable scale.

The report saw some signs for hope in the Clinton administration's funding requests, but feared that "the response to the epidemic is again tangled in politics".

== Aftermath ==
The commission ceased operations by law on September 3, 1993.

In her 2012 memoir, Mary Fisher assessed her experience:

[N]othing was ever given the power or drama of that first commission, in part because it was the first and in part because of the political tensions and rage surrounding AIDS during those times.
The original National Commission on AIDS might have succeeded in raising some national consciousness and, among those with AIDS, a bit of hope. But it never became a dynamic force for change. It gave the media an institution to monitor, and it provided a buffer of sorts between those with power and those with AIDS. Its members were well-intended, and its organizers were earnest. But our achievements were, in a word, lame. The commission was not a collective leader, and no one member's voice gained staying power.

The commission was succeeded by the Presidential Advisory Council on HIV/AIDS in 1995.

== See also ==
- Latino Commission on AIDS
- Office of National AIDS Policy
- Presidential Advisory Council on HIV/AIDS
- President's Commission on the HIV Epidemic
- President's Emergency Plan for AIDS Relief
