= Scott Evertz =

American PR adviser

Director of the Office of National AIDS Policy
- In office April 9, 2001 – July 19, 2002

Scott Evertz (born in Washington, D.C.) operates a governmental and international affairs consulting practice in Washington, DC. He advises private sector and non-governmental organizations on health policy and political strategies. Previously, he was Vice President for International Affairs, OraSure Technologies. Prior to that, he was the Director of the White House Office of National AIDS Policy, first started by Bill Clinton, and was appointed by George W. Bush. He was the first openly gay individual appointed to a political position by a Republican President in history, causing significant controversy among the party's social conservatives.

A Marquette University graduate, he spent over two decades in Wisconsin working in resource development assisting nonprofit organizations raise annual and capital funds. He became involved in Republican politics as a volunteer on Governor Tommy Thompson's first gubernatorial campaign in 1986. He worked closely with Thompson when he served as Secretary of Health and Human Services under President Bush and still considers the Governor a friend.

== Personal life ==
Evertz is a Roman Catholic. In 1980 Evertz moved to Wisconsin in 1980 to attend Catholic, Jesuit Marquette University in Milwaukee where he received a Bachelor of Arts in Theology and Political Science in 1984. Evertz works and primarily lives in Washington, DC, but maintains a home and legal residence in Wisconsin.
