= Linda Norman (nurse) =

American nurse

Linda Norman is an American nurse and academic administrator.

Norman completed bachelor's and master's degrees in nursing at the University of Virginia, followed by a doctor of nursing science at the University of Alabama at Birmingham. Prior to succeeding Colleen Conway-Welch as dean of the Vanderbilt University School of Nursing in 2013, she had spent 22 years at Vanderbilt University, where she taught as Valere Potter Menefee Professor of Nursing. In 2021, she stepped down as dean of Vanderbilt University School of Nursing, and on July 1, 2021, was named Dean Emerita, Vanderbilt University School of Nursing.
