= José Francisco Ruiz =

Tejano politician and military officer (1783-1840)

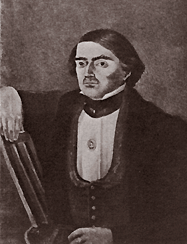

Senator of the Republic of Texas from the Bexar District
- In office 3 October 1836 – 25 September 1837
- Preceded by: Office established
- Succeeded by: Juan Seguín

Delegate to the Convention of 1836 from Béxar
- In office February 1836 – March 1836

Personal details
- Born: c. 28 January 1783 San Antonio de Béxar, Province of Texas, Viceroyalty of New Spain (now San Antonio, Texas, U.S.)
- Died: 19 January 1840 (aged 56) San Antonio, Republic of Texas
- Spouse: María Josefa Hernández (m. 1804)
- Relations: José Antonio Navarro (nephew)
- Children: 4, including Francisco Antonio Ruiz
- Occupation: Military officer; schoolmaster; ethnographer; politician

Military service
- Allegiance: Mexican insurgency Mexico
- Years of service: c. 1812–1813; 1821–1832
- Commands: Compañía del Álamo de Parras and Fort Tenoxtitlán
- Battles/wars: Mexican War of Independence; Battle of Medina; Fredonian Rebellion

José Francisco Ruiz (c. 28 January 1783 – 19 January 1840) was a Tejano military officer, schoolmaster, diplomat, ethnographer, and politician. Born in San Antonio de Béxar under Spanish rule, he fought as an insurgent in the Mexican War of Independence, and was forced into exile in Louisiana, where he traded among the Comanches and Lipan Apaches.

After Mexican independence he was commissioned in the Mexican Army, rising to captain with the rank of lieutenant colonel, founded and commanded Fort Tenoxtitlán, and served as a commissioner between the Mexican government and several Indigenous tribes. A federalist who had wanted Texas self-governing within Mexico, he concluded by 1835 that Mexico could not govern itself and supported separation.

Age and health kept him off the field during the Texas Revolution. On 2 March 1836, he and his nephew José Antonio Navarro became the only native-born Texans to sign the Texas Declaration of Independence. He then served as senator for the Bexar District in the First Congress of the Republic of Texas.

== Early life ==
Ruiz was born in San Antonio de Béxar, to Juan Manuel Ruiz and María Manuela de la Peña. The date of his birth is usually given as about 28 January 1783, as he was reported to have been baptized eight days later on 5 February 1783 in the parish church of San Fernando de Béxar. He is said to have completed part of his schooling in Spain. In 1803 he was appointed San Antonio’s first schoolmaster and taught in a house on Military Plaza that had belonged to his father; the building was later reconstructed on the grounds of the Witte Museum. He served as a regidor on the San Antonio cabildo in 1805 and as procurador in 1809.

On 8 March 1804, he married María Josefa Hernández at Mission Concepción. They had four children, including Francisco Antonio Ruiz, who was alcalde of San Antonio during the Battle of the Alamo and left an eyewitness account of the siege.

== Mexican War of Independence ==
On 14 January 1811, Ruiz joined the Milicia Provincial de Béxar, a local Spanish colonial militia, with the rank of lieutenant. He later joined the Ejército Republicano del Norte de México, the insurgent force fighting for independence from Spain, and served under José Bernardo Gutiérrez de Lara and then José Álvarez de Toledo y Dubois. He fought at the Battle of Medina on 18 August 1813. After the royalist victory a price was placed on his head and he was forced into exile.

He spent roughly a decade in exile, mainly in Louisiana, at times with his nephew José Antonio Navarro, and lived and traded among Indigenous peoples, especially the Comanches and Lipan Apaches.

== Career in Mexico ==
After Mexican independence, in the fall of 1821, while he was still at Natchitoches, Gaspar López, commandant general of the Eastern Internal Provinces under the first Mexican Empire, commissioned him to negotiate peace with the Comanches and Lipan Apaches. In a letter to Antonio Martínez he wrote that he would leave Natchitoches on 1 November 1821, under López’s commission and take the Indians to the capital if he could.

In 1822 he took a Lipan party to Mexico City. Two principal chiefs signed a peace treaty known as the Bustamante treaty on 17 August 1822. The treaty, ratified that September, guaranteed Lipan rights to water and pasture, the right to round up wild horses, and a Lipan–Comanche peace. He also attended a large Comanche council that year and helped bring a truce into San Antonio.

He was later appointed to the Mounted Militia. In 1823 he was promoted to army captain, unassigned, while holding the rank of lieutenant colonel; the commission was confirmed on 23 September 1825. He commanded a detachment at Nacogdoches during the suppression of the Fredonian Rebellion.

In 1827 he conducted a Wichita and Tawakoni delegation to San Antonio, where they made a treaty with Mexico. In 1827–1828 he served as consultant on Indians to Manuel de Mier y Terán’s Comisión de Límites and wrote his Report on the Indian Tribes of Texas in 1828. The Spanish manuscript is held at Yale University’s Beinecke Rare Book and Manuscript Library. In 1829 Shawnees in a letter to Stephen F. Austin called him the “big man in St. Antonio” who was “a good man no lie and a good friend to the Indians.”

Under the Law of 6 April 1830, he was ordered to establish a post on the Brazos River to limit Anglo-American immigration: while commanding the Segunda Compañía Volante de San Carlos de Parras, he founded and commanded Fort Tenoxtitlán in present-day Burleson County. The post suffered isolation, shortages, desertions, and hostile relations with nearby groups. In a letter to Stephen F. Austin dated 26 November 1830, he wrote that he was already tired of the command and wished to leave the army. Health problems led him to request retirement; the fort was abandoned in August 1832, and he retired from the Mexican Army at the end of that year with his pension. In 1833–1834 he received eleven leagues of land in areas that later became parts of Robertson, Brazos, Milam, Burleson, and Karnes counties.

== Texas Revolution and the Republic of Texas ==
By March 1835 Ruiz had turned against the centralist government in Mexico City. Navarro had been notified that he was obliged to attend a legislative session in Mexico City as a representative of Coahuila y Texas. Ruiz advised him not to go:

I feel horrified at the idea of having to pronounce this anathema on our dear country. I have fought and shed my blood in my youth for Mexico and Mexican liberty, and although advanced in years, I would offer her the aid of my arm, if I had the least glimmering of hope that this unhappy country could be capable of self-government, but I have not that hope for her. I see her ruin and inevitable degradation. I have military honors, you know it well, and receive a pension from the government of Mexico. I will lose it all rather than go to Mexico and unite myself to the ranks of that oppressive army. … Do not go to the Senate of Mexico, for you will only be going there to contribute to give the last funeral knell for the defunct liberty of Mexico. Do not go to Mexico, remain in Texas.

In late February he went to Washington-on-the-Brazos as a delegate from Béxar. On 2 March 1836 he and Navarro signed the Texas Declaration of Independence. With Lorenzo de Zavala, born in Yucatán, they were the only three signers born in Mexico; Ruiz and Navarro were the only two born in Texas.

He did not serve in active combat during the Texas Revolution. He was in his early fifties, had retired from the Mexican Army because of failing health.

He represented the Bexar District as senator in the First Congress of the Republic of Texas from 3 October 1836 to 25 September 1837. On 27 1836, writing from Columbia to his son-in-law Blas María Herrera, Ruiz warned him to leave if Mexican troops approached, and, if he stayed, by no means to take arms against the Texans, “for only God could possibly return the territory of Texas to the Mexican Government.” He told Herrera to pass the same advice to Francisco, then added that both men were free to follow their own decision, and that the important thing was that they stay united and look after each other.

== Death ==
Ruiz died in San Antonio, probably on 19 January 1840, and was buried there.

Preceded by none	Republic of Texas Senate; 1836-1837	Succeeded by Juan Seguín
