= Francisco Antonio Ruiz =

103rd Mayor of San Antonio, Texas
- In office January 1836 – February 1836
- Preceded by: José Ángel Navarro
- Succeeded by: José María Salinas

Personal details
- Born: 1804 San Antonio, Spanish Texas (Viceroyalty of New Spain, Spanish Empire)
- Died: October 18, 1876 (aged 71–72) San Antonio, Texas (USA)
- Profession: Alcalde and alderman

Francisco Antonio Ruiz (c. 1804 – October 18, 1876) was the alcalde of San Antonio during the Texas Revolution and was responsible for identifying the bodies of those killed at the Battle of the Alamo.

== Biography ==
Ruiz was born between 1804 and 1811 in San Antonio, then part of the Viceroyalty of New Spain interior province of Spanish Texas. He was the eldest son of José Francisco Ruiz and Josefa Hernandez.

Ruiz supported the Texian cause during the Texas Revolution, when he was the alcade of San Antonio. General Antonio Lopez de Santa Anna did not trust Ruiz, and when the Mexican army entered San Antonio to begin the siege of the Alamo, Santa Anna placed Ruiz under house arrest.

At the conclusion of the battle, Santa Anna ordered Ruiz to identify the bodies of David Crockett, James Bowie, and William Barret Travis and to dispose of the dead. He later "left one of the most vivid eyewitness accounts of the fall of the Alamo."

Ruiz stated that Crockett's body was found on the west side of the garrison, contradicting Susannah Dickinson's claim that he lay between the chapel and the low barracks to the south. He stated that Travis' body was found on a gun carriage on the north wall, with a single bullet wound to the forehead; and that Bowie's body was found in one of the rooms on the south side, on a bed.

== Account of the Battle of the Alamo ==
The Ruiz account, first translated and published in the 1860 Texas Almanac has been generally well regarded by historians as one of the few from the perspective of a non-combatant observer. Ruiz stated that the Mexican Army advanced against the Alamo in the early morning hours of March 6, 1836, utilizing 4,000 troops, although all did not take part in the assault. According to Ruiz, the Mexican's were repulsed twice, and he commented that the cannon fired from the Alamo resembled a constant thunder. The third wave that attacked the Alamo consisted, according to Ruiz, of 800 Mexican troops, of which only an estimated 130 survived. However, they breached the Alamo walls on this last assault, and were supported by other Mexican units. Ruiz stated that when the Mexicans entered the walls, he and Political Chief Don Ramon Musquiz accompanied Don Carlos de la Garza across the bridge on Commerce Street, so that they might get a better view. However, Mexican Dragoons fired on them, forcing them to withdraw. After a half an hour, Santa Anna sent for Ruiz, and ordered him to join him in the Alamo, to locate and identify the bodies of Travis, Crockett, and Bowie. After locating the bodies and identifying them, Ruiz was instructed to help dispose of the dead Mexican soldiers.

It was through the accounts by Ruiz that most historians base the number of confirmed defenders of the Alamo. The number of defenders has varied through history, with some indicating 180, while others indicate they believed the number to have been as high as 250. However, Ruiz stated that the Mexican Army burned 182 defender bodies after the battle. Gregorio Esparza, a Tejano defender, is known to have had his body claimed for proper burial by his two brothers, who received permission from Santa Anna to do so. Taking in accounts of others who claimed that their loved ones of Mexican descent were properly buried, the number of defenders is believed to have been between 182 and 189.

Historians have also pondered over the number of troops lost by Santa Anna's forces. Most now agree that the combined Mexican dead and wounded range between 400 and 500. Santa Anna overstated the Alamo defender losses, claiming 600 killed and reported "We lost 70 men killed and 300 wounded". Ruiz however, claimed that the Mexican Army lost an estimated 1,600 troops during the battle, and was ordered to have those bodies buried or otherwise disposed of. Due to there being insufficient room in the cemetery, Ruiz had many of the bodies thrown into the river. Some have questioned Ruiz estimating the Mexican losses at 1,600, while others have completely dismissed that estimate. In historian Thomas Ricks Lindsey's 2003 book "Alamo Traces" the author takes exception to Ruiz's inflated casualty numbers and asserts that the 1860 Ruiz account "...has been accepted by historians and writers without sufficient examination". Lindsey also makes the argument that Francisco Flores and not Francisco Ruiz was the alcade of San Antonio in February 1836 and that neither were present during the siege, having been sent on a mission by Travis and Bowie to transport ammunition, clothing and provisions to the Alamo.

== Later life ==
From 1837 until 1841, Ruiz served as an alderman in San Antonio. He strongly opposed Texas's annexation to the United States of America and believed that only those who had served during the Texas Revolution should be able to participate in making that decision. After the annexation was complete (late in 1845), Ruiz left San Antonio and lived for several years amongst the Indians.

He later returned to the now-U.S. city of San Antonio. After his death on October 18, 1876, he was buried in the Ruiz-Herrera family cemetery in Bexar County.
