= Patricia Fleming =

American politician

- Education: Vassar College
- Parent(s): Marion Stubbs Thomas and Frederick Douglass Stubbs

Patricia "Patsy" S. Fleming was the second director of the White House Office of National AIDS Policy, (ONAP) serving in that post between 1994 and 1997. She was appointed by President Bill Clinton, and was given direct access to the President and the cabinet. Fleming helped develop policy and budget proposals regarding AIDS, as well as a national strategy. She also acted as a liaison to community groups and as coordinator between different government agencies dealing with AIDS.

A graduate of Vassar College, Fleming's prior public service included working specifically on AIDS issues as a staff member for Congressman Ted Weiss between 1983 and 1992. During her years in Washington, she was also a special assistant to the Secretary of Health, Education and Welfare, and worked in the office of Civil Rights.

Fleming is the daughter of Marion Stubbs Thomas, founder of Jack and Jill of America, and Dr. Frederick Douglass Stubbs a thoracic surgeon. She is also a member of Delta Sigma Theta and the Northeasterners.
