= Office of National AIDS Policy =

American government office

The Office of National AIDS Policy, established under President Clinton in 1993, coordinates the continuing domestic efforts to implement the President's National HIV/AIDS Strategy. In addition, the office works to coordinate an increasingly integrated approach to the prevention, care and treatment of HIV/AIDS. As a unit of the Domestic Policy Council, the Office of National AIDS Policy coordinates with other White House offices. It is led by a director appointed by the president.

Following the inauguration of President Trump on January 20, 2017, the website for the Office of National AIDS Policy became inaccessible and it was reported the office was closed with the departure of the previous director, Amy Lansky, with no clear plans if or when President Trump planned to reopen it. In June 2017, six members of the council filed letters of resignation, citing that above all things the current administration "...simply does not care..." about the HIV/AIDS situation in the United States.

== Function ==
The Office of National AIDS Policy is part of the White House Domestic Policy Council and is tasked with coordinating the continuing efforts of the government to reduce the number of HIV infections across the United States. The office emphasizes prevention through wide-ranging education initiatives and helps to coordinate the care and treatment of citizens with HIV/AIDS.

The Office of National AIDS Policy also coordinates with the National Security Council and the Office of the Global AIDS Coordinator at the Department of State, and works with international bodies to ensure that America's response to the global pandemic is fully integrated with other prevention, care, and treatment efforts around the world. Through the U.S. President's Emergency Plan for AIDS Relief (PEPFAR) initiative, the U.S. has taken steps in responding to the global HIV/AIDS pandemic, working with countries heavily impacted by HIV/AIDS to help expand access to treatment, care, and prevention.

== National HIV/AIDS Strategy ==
In July 2010, President Obama released the National HIV/AIDS Strategy for the United States, the first comprehensive strategy to achieve a coordinated response to domestic HIV. The strategy had three main goals:

- Reducing the number of new infections
- Increasing access to care and optimizing health outcomes for people living with HIV
- Reducing HIV-related health disparities

The strategy was implemented across U.S. departments and agencies, including the Department Health and Human Services, Department of Justice, Department of Labor, Housing and Urban Development, and Department of Veterans Affairs.

== List of directors of the Office of National AIDS Policy ==
Parties

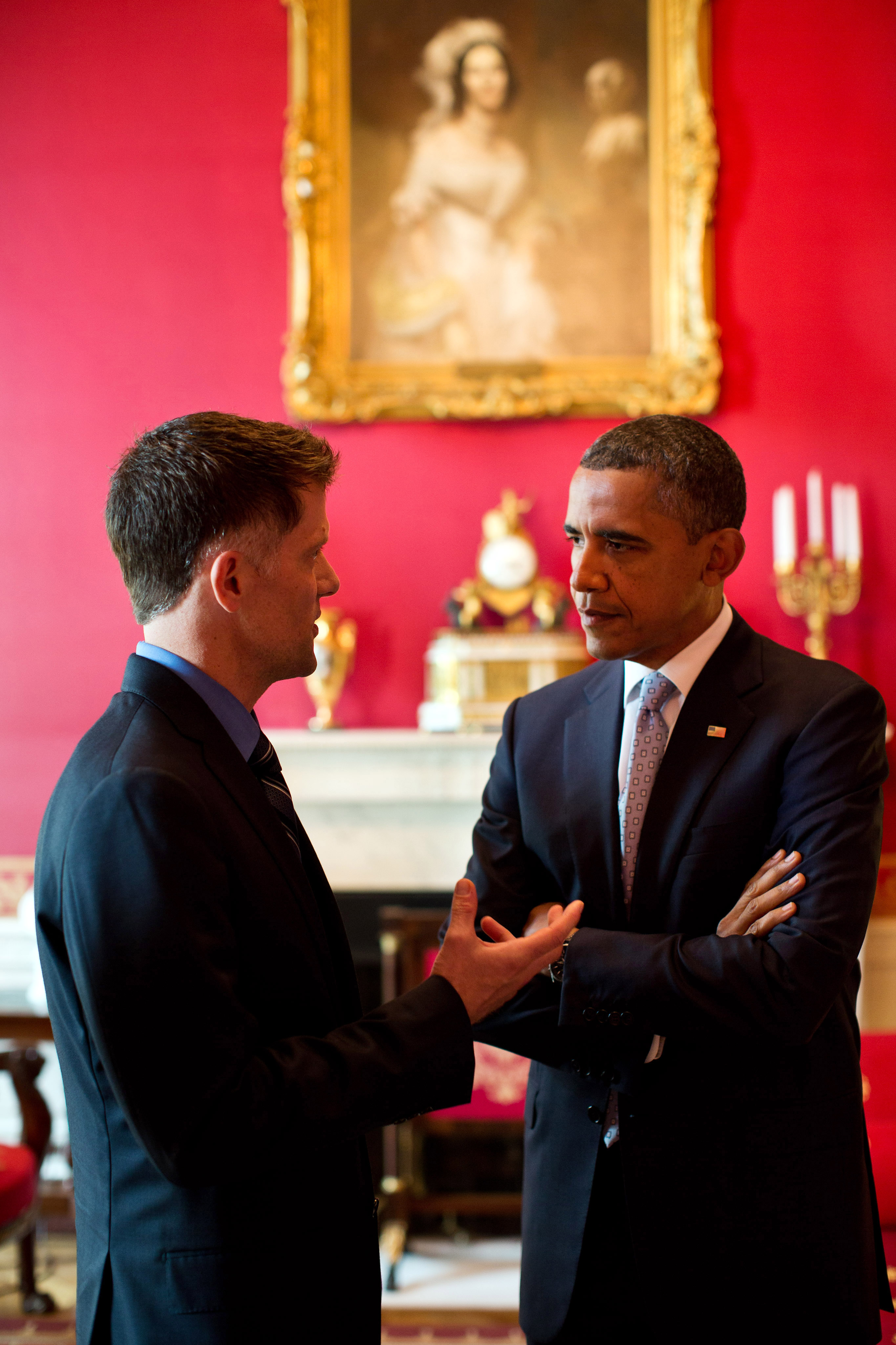
President Barack Obama talks with Director Grant Colfax before the White House International AIDS Conference reception, 2012

Democratic Republican

No.	Image	Name	Took office	Left office	President(s)
–		Kristine M. Gebbie (AIDS Policy Coordinator)	June 25, 1993	August 2, 1994	Bill Clinton
1		Patricia "Patsy" S. Fleming	August 2, 1994 (acting); November 10, 1994 (official)	February 1997	Bill Clinton
–		Eric P. Goosby, MD (acting)	February 1997	April 7, 1997	Bill Clinton
2		Sandra L. Thurman, MA	April 7, 1997	January 20, 2001	Bill Clinton
3		Scott H. Evertz	April 9, 2001	July 19, 2002	George W. Bush
4		Joseph O'Neill, MD, MS, MPH	July 19, 2002	August 2003	George W. Bush
5		Carol Thompson	August 2003 (acting); May 12, 2004 (official)	February 10, 2006	George W. Bush
6		Jeffrey Crowley, MPH	February 26, 2009	December 20, 2011	Barack Obama
7		Grant Colfax, MD	March 14, 2012	January 13, 2014	Barack Obama
8		Douglas M. Brooks, MSW	March 24, 2014	March 24, 2016	Barack Obama
9		Amy Lansky, PhD, MPH	March 25, 2016	January 4, 2017	Barack Obama
10		Harold J. Phillips, MRP	June 7, 2021	January 19, 2024	Joe Biden
11		Francisco Ruiz	April 8, 2024	January 25, 2025	Joe Biden

== See also ==
- National Commission on AIDS
- Presidential Advisory Council on HIV/AIDS
- President's Commission on the HIV Epidemic
- President's Emergency Plan for AIDS Relief
