= Jeffrey Crowley =

American government official

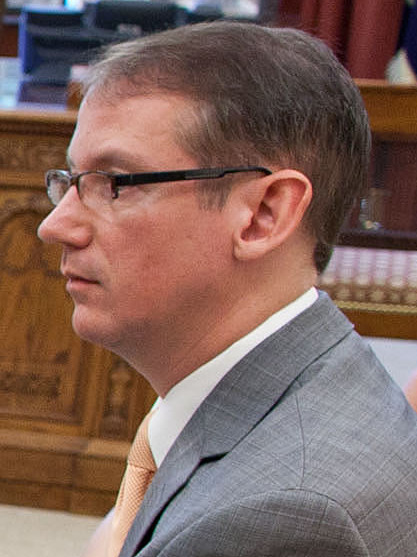
- Born: 1965 (age 60–61)
- Education: Johns Hopkins University, M.P.H.

Jeffrey S. Crowley (born c. 1965) is best known as a member of the Domestic Policy Council in the administration of U.S. President Barack Obama as the director of the Office of National AIDS Policy (ONAP) from 2009 to 2011, tasked with coordinating the U.S. government's efforts regarding HIV/AIDS prevention, treatment and care and developing the National HIV/AIDS Strategy.

Previously, Crowley was a senior scholar and researcher at the Health Policy Institute at Georgetown University where he focused on Medicare and Medicaid policy from 2000 to 2009. Prior to that time, he worked at the National Association of People with AIDS, beginning as a public policy intern in 1994, and finally serving as deputy executive director for programs in 2000.

Crowley is the author of both research and consumer education publications, and has made numerous presentations on HIV/AIDS and disability issues.

Crowley was raised in Grand Rapids, Michigan. He graduated from Kalamazoo College with a B.A. in chemistry, and earned a Master of Public Health degree from Johns Hopkins University. After graduation from college, Crowley served in the United States Peace Corps as a high school science teacher in Swaziland.
